= Crusades of the 15th century =

Crusades of the fifteenth century
- Part of the Crusades
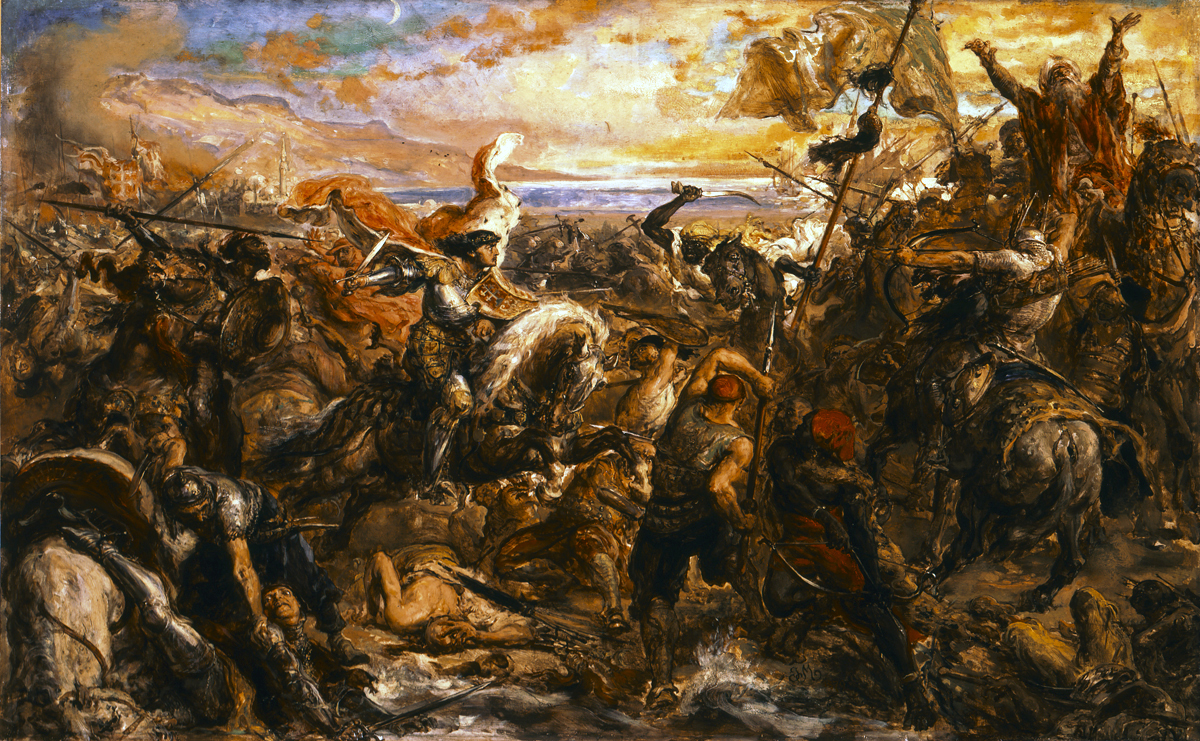
- Władysław III of Poland in the Battle of Varna, by Jan Matejko
Date	1400–1499
Location	Levant, Baltic, Iberia, Italy, Northern Africa
Result	Ottoman victory: Decline of Mamluks and Mongols
Territorial changes	Hospitallers successful: Ottomans conquest of Constantinople; Ottomans take over Eastern Europe; Jerusalem secured in Muslim hands

Belligerents
France: Charles VI Charles VII Louis XI Charles VIII Louis XII; England: Richard II Henry IV Henry V Henry VI Edward IV Edward V Richard III Henry VII; Cyprus: James I Janus John II Charlotte Louis of Savoy James II James III Catherine Cornaro; Sicily/Naples: Martin the Younger Martin of Aragon Ferdinand I of Aragon Alfonso V of Aragon Ferdinand I of Naples Alfonso II of Naples; Papacy: Boniface IX Innocent VII Gregory XII Martin V Eugene IV Nicholas V Callixtus III Pius II Paul II Sixtus IV Innocent VIII Alexander VI Antipopes Clement VII Benedict XIII John XXIII Alexander V; Byzantine Empire; John V Palaiologos; John VII Palaiologos; Manuel II Palaeologus; John VIII Palaiologos; Constantine XI; Latin East; Theodore I Palaiologos; Theodore II Palaiologos; Constantine XI; Thomas Palaiologos; Demetrios Palaiologos; Graitzas Palaiologos; James of Baux; Centurione II Zaccaria; John Asen Zaccaria; Antonio I Acciaioli; Angelo II Acciaioli; Castile; Henry the Suffering; John II; Henry the Impotent; Isabella I Ferdinand V Aragon; Martin the Humane; Ferdinand of Antequera; Alfonso the Magnanimous; John the Great; Ferdinand II; Portugal; John of Aviz; Edward the Eloquent; Alfonso the African; John the Perfect Prince; Manuel the Fortunate; Hungary; Sigismund; Albert II of Germany; Władysław III of Poland; John Hunyadi; Ladislaus the Posthumous; Matthias Corvinus; Vladislaus II of Hungary; Wallachia; Mircea I of Wallachia; Michael I of Wallachia; Dan II of Wallachia; Vlad Dracula III; Radu cel Frumos; Vladislav II of Wallachia; Trebizond; John IV of Trebizond; David of Trebizond; Moldavia; Bogdan II of Moldavia; Peter III Aaron; Stephen the Great	Mamluk Sultanate; Barquq; An-Nasir Faraj; Barsbay; Sayf ad-Din Jaqmaq; Sayf ad-Din Inal; Khushqadam; Qaitbay; Ottoman Empire; Murad I Bayezid I Interregnum; Mehmed I Murad II; Mehmed II; Bayezid II; Cem Sultan; Timurids; Timur; Shah Rukh; Abu Sa'id Mirza; Emirate of Granada; Muhammad VII; Muhammad VIII; Muhammad IX; Yusuf IV; Marinid Sultanate; Abu Sa'id Uthman III; Abd al-Haqq II; Aq Qoyunlu; Uthman Beg; Uzun Hasan; Ya'qub Beg; Sultan Murad; Qara Qoyunlu; Jahan Shah; Mirza Yusuf; Hasan Ali; Poland; Władysław II Jagiełło; Władysław III; Casimir IV Jagiellon; John I Albert; Alexander I Jagiellon; Lithuania; Vytautas; Švitrigaila; Sigismund Kęstutaitis; Michael Žygimantaitis; Hussites; Jan Hus; John Wycliffe; Jan Želivský; Jan Žižka; Mikuláš of Hus; Sigismund Korybut; Prokop the Great; Jan Čapek; Feodor Ostrogski; Crimean Khanate; Hacı I Giray; Meñli I Giray

Commanders and leaders
Hospitallers; Philibert de Naillac; Anton Flavian de Ripa; Jean de Lastic; Jacques de Milly; Piero Raimondo Zacosta; Giovanni Battista Orsini; Pierre d'Aubusson; Teutonic Knights; Conrad of Jungingen; Ulrich of Jungingen; Henry of Plauen; Michael Küchmeister; Paul of Rusdorf; Conrad of Erlichshausen; Ludwig of Erlichshausen; Henry Reuss of Plauen; Frederick of Saxony; Order of the Dragon; Vuk Lazarević; Fruzhin; Pippo Spano; Vlad II Dracul; Vlad the Impaler; Gjergj Arianiti; Iberian orders Álvaro de Luna; Henry of Aragon; Henry the Navigator; Philip of Viana; Serbia; Stefan Lazarević; Đurađ Branković; Grgur Branković; Thomas Kantakouzenos Other nobility: Ladislaus of Naples Louis II of Anjou Jadwiga of Poland Vytautas the Great Albert of Sweden Barbara von Cilli Margaret I of Denmark Theodore Kantakouzenos Jean II Le Maingre Manuel Chrysoloras Eleanor of Arborea Pedro de Meneses Ferdinand the Saint Peter of Coimbra John of Portugal Oldřich II of Rosenberg Eric VII of Denmark Frederick of Brandenburg Bogislav IX Stephen II of Moldavia Gennadius Scholarius Philip the Good Frederick III of Germany Charles I of Savoy; Other participants: Victual Brothers Pietro Loredan Alvise Loredan Jan Bażyński Shah Ismail Wenceslaus IV Abu Zakariya Lipolt Krajíř Henry Beaufort Joan of Arc Julian Cesarini Symeon of Thessalonica Giuliano Cesarini Kasım Bey Isidore of Kiev Giovanni Giustiniani Piotr Dunin Bernhard von Zinnenberg Paolo Fregoso	Bosnia; Vlatko Vuković; Tvrtko I Stjepan Vukčić Kosača; Ishak-Beg; Isa-Beg Isaković; Thomas of Bosnia; Stephen Tomašević; Radivoj of Bosnia; Albania; Gjergj Arianiti; Depë Zenebishi; Gjon Kastrioti; Skanderbeg; Nicholas Dukagjini; Ottoman commanders Ibrahim II of Karaman; Hamza Bey; Süleyman Çelebi; Turahanoğlu Ömer Bey; İsa Çelebi; Musa Çelebi; Süleyman Çelebi; Mihaloğlu; Mustafa Çelebi; Küçük Mustafa; Ali Bey Evrenosoğlu; Turahan Bey; Ishak Bey; Hadım Şehabeddin; Kasim Pasha; Mahmud Bey; Mesih Pasha; Karaca Pasha; Zagan Pasha; Ishak Pasha; Çandarlı Halil Pasha; Suleiman Baltoghlu; Hamza Pasha; Ballaban Pasha; Gedik Ahmed Pasha

The Crusades of the 15th century are those Crusades that follow the Crusades after Acre, 1291–1399, throughout the next hundred years. In this time-period, the threat from the Ottoman Empire dominated the Christian world, but further threats—from the Mamluks, Moors, and heretics—impinged upon the Christian West as well. The Ottomans gained significant territory in all theaters, but did not defeat Hospitaller Rhodes, nor advance past the Balkans; in addition, the Reconquista was completed, and heresies continued to be suppressed.

The Fall of Constantinople in 1453 marked the end of the Byzantine Empire, and the Teutonic Knights were spent as a fighting force. The Crusades would continue for almost another 100 years, with the expansion of the Ottoman Empire into a major world power—a level of international influence that lasted into the 20th century.

== The Christian West ==
=== France and England ===
At the beginning of the 15th century, Charles VI of France had been king for two decades and France and England were consumed by the continuing Hundred Years' War. Richard II of England would soon be replaced by Henry IV of England. Neither of the kings were in a position to support a crusade, but they would both host the Byzantine emperor Manuel II Palaiologos in his quest to gain help in his fight against the Ottoman Empire. Manuel first met Charles at Charenton-le-Pont on 3 June 1400, and then Henry from December 1400 to February 1401 at Eltham Palace, returning to France on his journey home. Manuel received monetary support but little else.

During a lull in the fighting with the English, France became embroiled in the Armagnac–Burgundian Civil War, which began in 1407 and would continue for decades. Henry IV would be succeeded by his son Henry V of England, who renewed the offensive against France. In 1415, Charles' army was crushed by the English at the Battle of Agincourt, which led to the signing of the Treaty of Troyes.

Following Agincourt, Sigismund of Luxembourg made a visit to Henry in hopes of making peace between England and France. His goal was to persuade Henry to modify his demands against the French. Henry had him enrolled in the Order of the Garter and Sigismund, in turn, inducted Henry into the Order of the Dragon. Henry had intended to crusade for the order after uniting the English and French thrones, but he died before fulfilling his plans. Sigismund left England several months later, having signed the Treaty of Canterbury acknowledging English claims to France.

Charles VI also received the archbishop Jean of Sultānīya, who arrived in Paris on 15 June 1403 as an ambassador from the emperor Timur. Timur offered an offensive and defensive alliance with Charles, as well as the development of commercial relations. Charles was only able to send an answer and an envoy shortly before Timur's death in 1405.

=== Western Schism ===
The Western Schism had begun in 1378 and was still plaguing the papacy when Boniface IX was elected pope on 2 November 1389. During his tenure, the Avignon claimants, Clement VII and Benedict XIII, maintained the Roman Curia in Avignon, under the protection of the French monarchy. In 1398 and 1399, Boniface had appealed to Christian Europe in favor of Manuel II Palaeologus, threatened at Constantinople by the Ottoman sultan Bayezid I, but there was little enthusiasm for a new crusade at such a time. Manuel's subsequent visit to France and England achieved little.

Boniface IX died on 1 October 1404 and was succeeded by Innocent VII, whose uneventful papacy ended on 6 November 1406. After the Papal Conclave of 1406, the new pope took the name Gregory XII. Gregory started negotiations with Benedict XXIII, suggesting that they both resign, so a new pope could be elected to reunite the Catholic Church. When these talks ended in stalemate in 1408, Charles VI of France declared that his kingdom was neutral to both papal contenders.

Charles helped to organise the Council of Pisa in 1409. This council was supposed to arrange for both Gregory and Benedict to resign, so that a new universally recognised pope could be elected. To oppose this, Benedict convoked the Council of Perpignan in November 1408, with little success. Since both Benedict and Gregory refused to abdicate, the only achievement in Pisa was that a third candidate to the Holy See was put forward on 26 June 1409 and became known as Alexander V.

In 1411, the antipope John XXIII proclaimed his own crusade against Ladislaus of Naples, the protector of rival Gregory XII. In 1409, Louis II of Anjou had liberated Rome from Ladislaus' occupation, and he joined John XXIII's crusade, where he attacked Ladislaus and defeated him at the Battle of Roccasecca on 19 May 1411.

=== Council of Constance ===
The Council of Constance was held from 1414 to 1418 in the Bishopric of Constance. The council ended the Western Schism by deposing or accepting the resignation of the remaining papal claimants and by electing a new pope. The council also condemned Jan Hus as a heretic and facilitated his execution by the civil authority. It also ruled on issues of national sovereignty, the rights of pagans and just war.

After deposing John XXIII in 1415, the council was divided by the conflicting claims of Gregory XII and Benedict XIII. A compromise candidate Martin V was elected pope, at the age of 48, at the council on St. Martin's Day, 11 November 1417.

=== Crusades of Martin V ===
After a long stay in Florence, Martin was able to enter Rome in September 1420. He at once set to work establishing order and restoring dilapidated churches, palaces, bridges, and other public structures. For this reconstruction, he engaged some famous masters of the Tuscan school and helped instigate the Roman Renaissance.

On 1 March 1420, Martin V issued a papal bull inviting all Christians to unite in a crusade against the Lollards led by John Wycliffe, the Hussites, and other heretics. The crusades were, however, ultimately unsuccessful.

In addition, Martin declared a crusade against the Ottoman Empire in 1420 in response to the rising pressure from the Ottoman Turks. In 1419–1420, Martin had diplomatic contacts with the Byzantine emperor Manuel II, who was invoking his own council in Constantinople. On 12 July 1420, the pope conceded to attach an indulgence to anyone who would contribute to a crusade against the Turks, which would be led by Sigismund. Martin also authorized a crusade against Africa in 1418 in relation to the slave trade.

=== Waldensian Crusade ===
The Waldensians (or Valdois) were a Christian sect that began as an ascetic movement. They were declared heretics in 1215 and, in 1487, Innocent VIII issued a bull Id Nostri Cordis for their extermination. A crusade to fulfill the bull order was organized and a military offensive was launched in the territories of Charles I of Savoy. Charles eventually intervened to save his territories from further turmoil and promised the Vaudois peace, but not before the offensive had devastated the area and many of the Vaudois had fled. The crusade prompted John Milton to write his sonnet On the Late Massacre in Piedmont.

== Military Orders ==
The military orders were dominant in the 15th century, providing forces to deal with both Muslim and heretical threats. These included the Knights Hospitaller, headquartered at Rhodes; the Teutonic Knights, operating from the Ordensstaat in Central Europe and the Baltic; the Order of the Dragon formed to fight the Ottomans; and the remnants of the Knights Templar in Iberia.

=== Knights Hospitaller ===
Hospitaller Rhodes was the strongest Christian presence in the Mediterranean and would remain so for decades. Their stronghold of Smyrna in Anatolia had been under their control since the Smyrniote Crusade in 1344. It was lost with the Siege of Smyrna in 1402, conquered by the Timurids who had replaced the Ottomans' dominance during the Ottoman Interregnum.

Philibert de Naillac was Grand Master from 1396 until his death in 1421, and the Order's military strength provided stability in the region, despite the presence of Barbary pirates, also known as the Ottoman corsairs. The position of the Order as a Mediterranean seapower was strengthened by commercial treaties with Venice, Pisa, Genoa, and Egypt.

Confronted by the now firmly established Ottomans, the Hospitallers needed another stronghold on the mainland to support their headquarters at Rhodes. De Naillac identified a suitable site across from the island of Kos, then controlled by the Genoese. Bodrum Castle, known as the Castle of Saint Peter, was built by the Order in the site of a fortification occupied as early as 1110 BC as well as of a Turkish castle in the 11th century. Construction began in 1404 and workers were guaranteed a reservation in heaven by a papal decree in 1409. They used material from the nearby Mausoleum of Halicarnassus to fortify the castle. The inner structures were finished in 1406 and the first walls were not completed until 1437.

Anton Flavian de Ripa (1421–1437) became Grand Master in 1421 and at that time, the 1403 treaty negotiated by de Naillac and Mamluk sultan an-Nasir Faraj governed relations between Rhodes and Egypt. That would change in 1426 when Barsbay invaded Cyprus and laid waste to the commandery at Kolossi Castle.

Jean de Lastic (1437–1454) became Grand Master in 1437 and would face threats from Ottoman invaders as they increased their naval power. In 1444, an Ottoman fleet began the Siege of Rhodes, which was successfully repelled. During this time, the Order was at the zenith of its power, and played a significant military role in the defense of the Mediterranean against Turkish encroachment. When Ibrahim II of Karaman captured the castle of Corycus from Cyprus in 1448, de Lastic appealed to Mamluk sultan Sayf ad-Din Jaqmaq to have the castle returned. His rule still saw the Fall of Constantinople of 1453, initiating a century of Ottoman naval dominance over the eastern Mediterranean.

Jacques de Milly (1454–1461) succeeded Jean de Lastic as Grand Master. In 1455, Kos and Nisyros faced its first serious Ottoman attack in 1455. Its navy under the command of Hamza Bey attacked the island, besieged and destroyed the Andimacheia Castle. The Hospitallers were frequently at odds with the Venetians during this period.

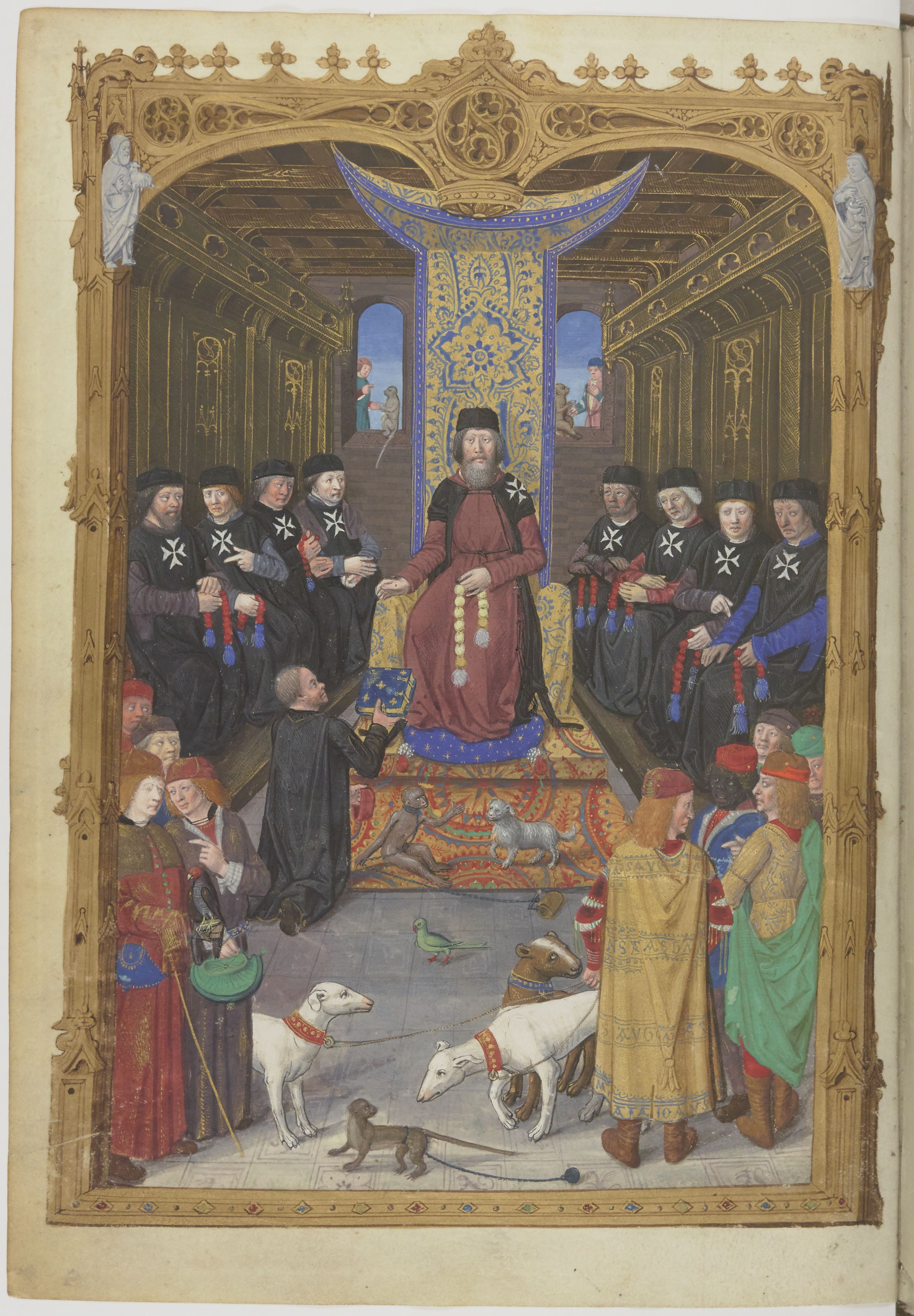
Grand Master Pierre d'Aubusson with senior knights, wearing the Rhodian cross on their habits

Piero Raimondo Zacosta (1461–1467) succeeded Jacques de Milly and refused to pay tribute demanded by Mehmed II. In 1464, Venetian captain Alvise Loredan led an expedition to Rhodes to free a group of Muslim travellers to Egypt captured en route. Giovanni Battista Orsini (1467–1476) took the responsibility for the repair and modernization of the fortifications of the city of Rhodes, the other castles of the Order on the islands of the Dodecanese, and the Château Saint Pierre (Bodrum Castle).

Pierre d'Aubusson was Grand Master from 1476 to 1503. In 1480, he led the small Hospitaller garrison of Rhodes that withstood the latest Siege of Rhodes. After his death in 1491, Mehmed's son Cem Sultan sought refuge from his brother Bayezid II. Cem was guarded by d'Aubusson and the Hospitallers first in Rhodes and later in France and Rome.

=== Teutonic Knights ===
The State of the Teutonic Order maintained the greatest fighting force in Northern Europe, reaching the peak of its international prestige and hosted numerous European crusaders and nobility at the beginning of the 15th century. Conrad of Jungingen (1393–1407) was Grand Master at that time, and under his administration, the Teutonic Order would reach its greatest extent.

In 1386, Grand Duke of Lithuania was baptised into Christianity and married Jadwiga of Poland, taking the name Władysław II Jagiełło and becoming King of Poland. This created a Polish-Lithuanian Union, a formidable opponent for the Teutonic Knights. The Order initially managed to play Władysław II and his cousin Vytautas off against each other, but this strategy failed when Vytautas began to suspect that the Order was planning to annex parts of his territory.

The baptism of Władysław began the official conversion of Lithuania to Christianity. Although the crusader mission for the Order ended when Prussia and Lithuania had become officially Christian, the feuds and wars with Lithuania and Poland continued. The Lizard League was created in 1397 by Prussian nobles in Chełmno Land to oppose the Order's policy. Prussian knight Jan Bażyński left service of the Order to join the Lizard League.

Albert of Sweden ceded Gotland to the Order with the understanding that they would eliminate the pirating Victual Brothers. An invasion force under Conrad of Jungingen conquered the island in 1398. Upon the death of Conrad in 1407, Ulrich of Jungingen (1407–1410) became Grand Master, and in 1409 guaranteed peace with the Kalmar Union by selling Gotland to Margaret I of Denmark.

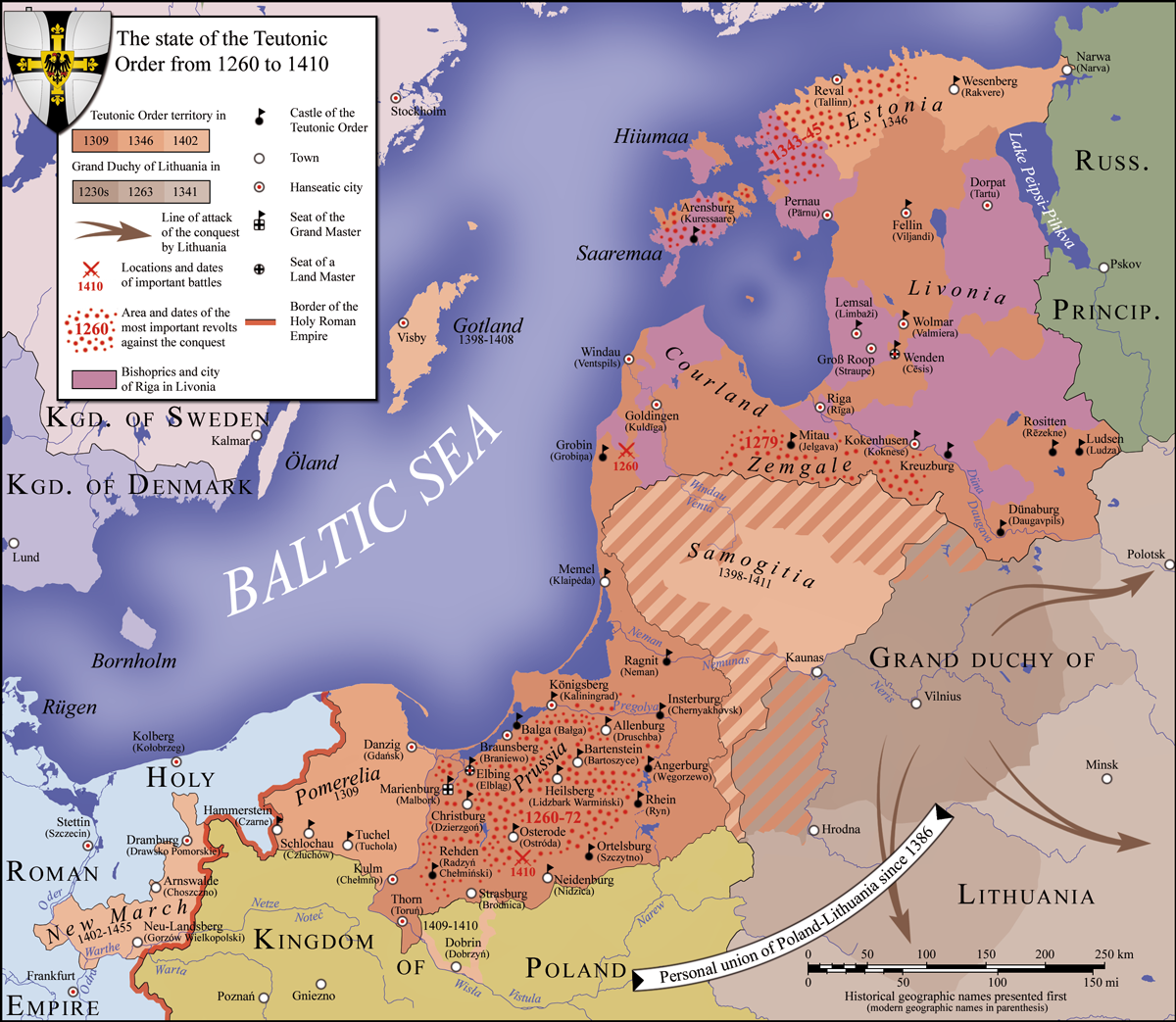
Teutonic state in 1410

By 1407, the Teutonic Order reached its greatest territorial extent and included the lands of Prussia, Pomerelia, Samogitia, Courland, Livonia, Estonia, Dagö, and Ösel with its fortress Kuressaare Castle. The Neumark was pawned by Brandenburg in 1402 and it passed completely under the Order's control in 1429, although the region was neglected. Ulrich's policy of confrontation with Lithuania and Poland would spark the Polish–Lithuanian–Teutonic War and lead to disaster for the Order, and his own death, at the Battle of Grunwald.

Grand Master Henry of Plauen (1410–1413) fought to restore the Order's status, but was removed from office. He did oversee the First Peace of Thorn. He was succeeded by Michael Küchmeister of Sternberg (1413–1422), who was captured at the Battle of Koronowo. During the tenure of his successor Paul of Rusdorf (1422–1441), the Prussian League was established to counter the Order. Paul also signed the Treaty of Melno. Conrad of Erlichshausen (1441–1449) and his cousin Ludwig of Erlichshausen (1450–1467) served next, engaging in the Thirteen Years' War, resulting the Second Peace of Thorn which made the Grand Masters vassals to Poland in some territories.

Henry Ruess of Plauen took control of the army after the Thirteen Years' War, having led the victory at the Battle of Chojnice. He then served as Grand Master from 1467 to 1470. He was succeeded by Henry Reffle of Richtenberg (1470–1477), Martin Truchsess of Wetzhausen (1477–1489), and John of Tiefen (1489–1497). Frederick of Saxony was the last Grand Master of the 15th century, serving from 1498 to 1510. The Order had been in a long power struggle with Poland over Prussia, complicated by the fact that Frederick was related by marriage to John I Albert of Poland. When John attempted to interfere in the business of the Order, Frederick referred the matter to the Imperial Reichstag, which informed John that he could not interfere in the Grand Master's free exercise of power in Prussia.

=== Order of the Dragon ===
The Order of the Dragon was a chivalric order for the higher aristocracy and monarchs, fashioned after the military orders of the Crusades, and requiring its initiates to defend the cross and fight the enemies of Christianity, particularly the Ottoman Empire. The Order flourished during the first half of the 15th century, primarily in Germany and Italy. After Sigismund's death in 1437, its importance declined in Western Europe. However, after the Fall of Constantinople in 1453, it continued to play a role in Hungary, Serbia and Romania, the countries which bore the brunt of the Ottoman wars in Europe.

The history of the Order dates to 1396, when Boniface IX proclaimed a crusade against the Ottomans. A campaign was organized to liberate Bulgaria from the Turks, save Constantinople, and put a halt to the Ottoman expansion. Sigismund was nominally in charge. But, at the Battle of Nicopolis, the French commander John the Fearless ignored Sigismund's entreaties by charging the Turks. About 12,000 crusaders died with only a few leaders, including Sigismund, escaping. Sigismund returned to Hungary in 1401 and, facing a number of revolts, gradually resumed control and re-asserted himself as the King of Hungary.

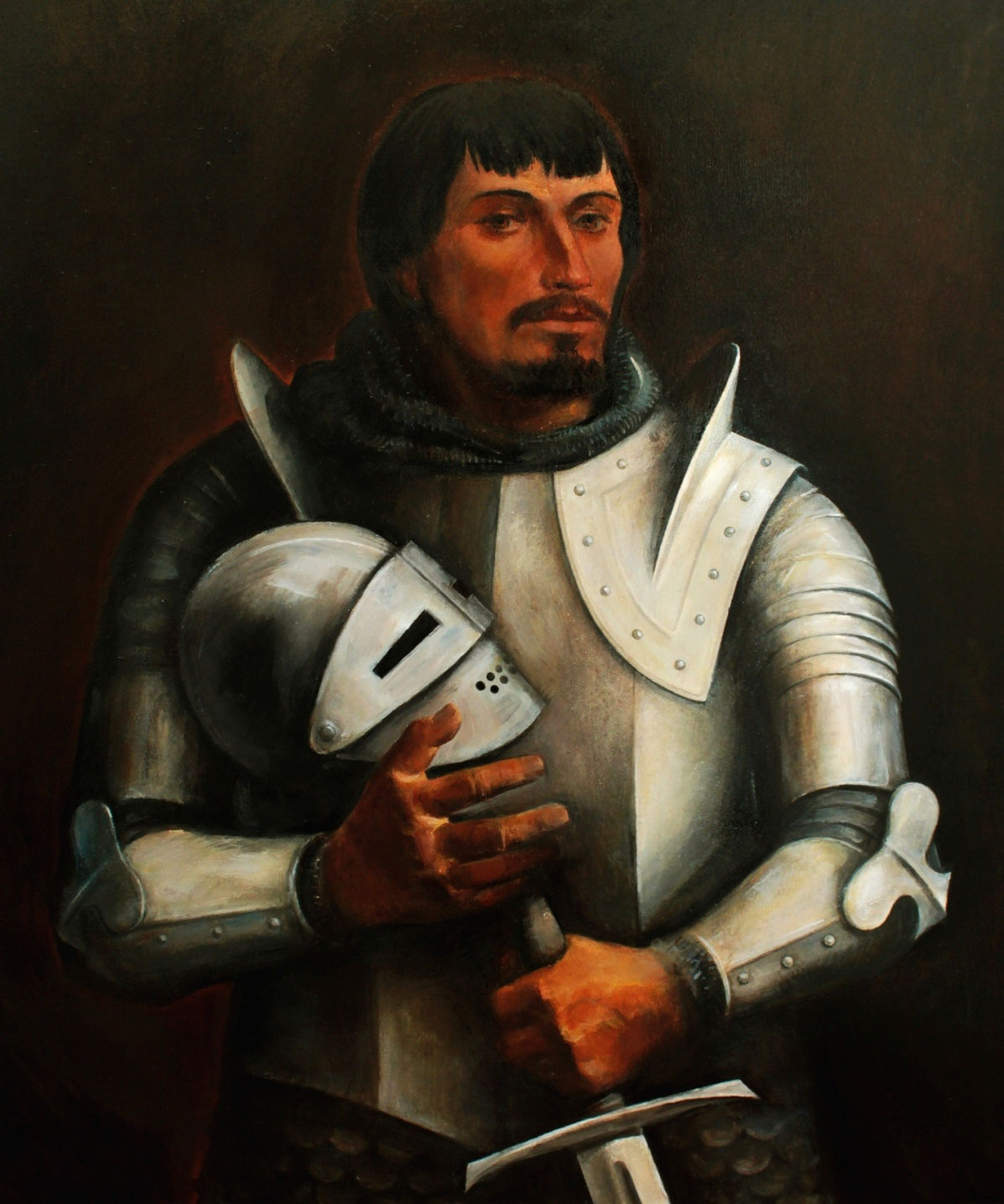
Fruzhin, Prince of Bulgaria

On 12 December 1408, Sigismund and his wife Barbara von Cilli founded the Order of the Dragon. The Order adopted Saint George as its patron saint, whose legendary defeat of a dragon was used as a symbol for the military and religious ethos of the order. Among the members of the Order were Henry V of England (honorary member), Serbian despot Stefan the Tall (Lazarević) and his brother Vuk Lazarević, Bulgarian prince Fruzhin, and Albanian military leader Gjergj Arianiti. Wallachian rulers Vlad II Dracul and his son Vlad the Impaler took their names from the Order of the Dragon, as Dracul in Old Romanian and related languages, means the dragon or the devil.

=== Military Orders in Iberia ===
The Order of Santiago was a religious and military order founded in the 12th century in León and Castile. Its initial objective was to protect the pilgrims on the Way of St. James, to defend Christendom, and to remove the Muslim Moors from the Iberian Peninsula. Álvaro de Luna was a confidant of John II of Castile and Constable of Castile who served as the Grand Master of the Order from 1445 to 1453. He succeeded Henry of Aragon, from the Aragonese royal family of Trastámara, between 1409 and 1445.

In the early 14th century, the Knights Templar were disbanded over much of Europe and the Levant. Nevertheless, in Portugal, the Templars survived in two guises: Military Order of Christ and the Order of Montesa.

The Military Order of Christ grew out of the former order of the Knights Templar as it was reconstituted in Portugal. In 1319, Denis of Portugal revived the Templars of Tomar as the Order of Christ, largely for their aid during the Reconquista and in the reconstruction of Portugal after the wars. They were based at the Convent of Christ, a 12th-century Templar stronghold. Denis negotiated with the pope for recognition of the new order and its right to inherit the Templar assets and property. This was granted by the papal bull Ad ea ex quibus on 14 March 1319.

After 1417, John of Aviz appointed Henry the Navigator as the Order's Grand Master. Funded by the Order, Henry organized the Navigator's School in Sagres, preparing the way for Portuguese supremacy. From this village, the first great wave of expeditions of the Period of Discoveries were launched. The Order after Henry continued into the 16th century with papal support.

The Templars had been received with enthusiasm within Aragon from their foundation in 1128. After 1312, James II of Aragon was allowed to recoup the Templar properties in Aragon and Valencia, and to create a new military order charged with the defense of the frontier against the Moors and the pirates. This new Order of Montesa was approved on 10 June 1317. There were fourteen Grand Masters of the Order. In 1485, Philip of Viana renounced the Archbishopric of Palermo to become grand master. He died fighting in the Granada War in 1488. The office of grand master was united with the Crown by Philip II of Spain in 1587.

== Byzantium and the Balkans ==
The Byzantine–Ottoman wars were a series of decisive conflicts that led to the final destruction of the Byzantine Empire and the rise of the Ottoman Empire. The Byzantines, already having been in a weak state even before the partitioning of their Empire following the Fourth Crusade, never recovered fully. They faced increasingly disastrous defeats against the Ottomans, ultimately losing Constantinople in 1453, formally ending the conflicts. Many of the states founded as part of the resultant Latin Empire were still active at the beginning of the 15th century but would eventually fall to the Ottomans.

=== Byzantine Empire ===
Manuel II Palaeologus was the second son of John V Palaiologos, and in 1373 was proclaimed heir and co-emperor of his father and was crowned on 25 September 1373. During the Byzantine Civil War of 1373–1379, Manuel and his father were displaced, and Manuel was forced to go as a hostage to the court of the Bayezid I at Bursa. During his stay, Manuel was forced to participate in the Ottoman campaign that led to the Fall of Philadelphia, the last Byzantine enclave in Anatolia.

When his father died in February 1391, Manuel fled the Ottoman court and secured the capital against any potential rival claims. Following Manuel's coronation, Bayezid was initially content to leave Byzantium in comparative peace, until 1394 when the Byzantine-Ottoman wars continued with the Siege of Constantinople. In the meantime, an anti-Ottoman crusade led by Sigismund failed at the Battle of Nicopolis on 25 September 1396. Manuel II had sent ten ships to help in that crusade. In October 1397, Theodore Kantakouzenos requested help from France and England, but they were beset with domestic troubles and unable to provide any support.

French marshall Jean II Le Maingre accompanied six ships carrying 1,200 men to assist Manuel II. Le Maingre encouraged the emperor to go personally to seek assistance against the Ottoman Empire from the courts of Western Europe. After some five years of siege, Manuel II entrusted the city to his nephew John VII Palaiologos while he went abroad to France and England to beseech the kings for support.

Map of the southern Balkans and western Anatolia in 1410

The Ottomans were defeated by Timur at the Battle of Ankara in 1402. As the sons of Bayezid I struggled with each other over the succession in the Ottoman Interregnum, John VII was able to secure the return of the European coast of the Sea of Marmara and Thessalonica through the Treaty of Gallipoli negotiated with one of Bayezid's sons, Süleyman Çelebi. When Manuel II returned home in 1403, his nephew duly surrendered control of Constantinople and received as a reward the governorship of newly recovered Thessalonica. The treaty also regained Varna and the Marmara coast from Scutari to Nicomedia. Nevertheless, Manuel II kept in contact with Venice, Genoa, Paris and Aragon by sending envoy Manuel Chrysoloras in 1407 to form a coalition against the Ottomans.

Manuel II was on friendly terms with Mehmed I, the victor in the Interregnum, but his attempts to meddle in the next contested succession led to the Siege of Constantinople by Murad II in 1422. During the last years of his life, Manuel II relinquished most official duties to his son and heir John VIII Palaiologos, and went back to the West searching for assistance against the Ottomans. Under the domination of the Ottomans for a century, Byzantine would eventually fall in 1453 with the Conquest of Constantinople.

=== The Morea, Achaea and Athens ===
The Despotate of the Morea was established as a Byzantine territory in 1349 under Manuel Kantakouzenos. In 1380, the rival Palaiologos dynasty seized the Morea, with Theodore I Palaiologos becoming despot in 1383. Theodore ruled until 1407, consolidating Byzantine rule and coming to terms with his more powerful neighbours—particularly the expansionist Ottoman Empire, whose suzerainty he recognized. Subsequent despots were the sons of the emperor Manuel II Palaiologos: Theodore II Palaiologos, Constantine XI Palaiologos, Demetrios Palaiologos, and Thomas Palaiologos. As Latin power in the Peloponnese waned during the 15th century, the Morea expanded to incorporate the entire peninsula in 1430. Territory was acquired by dowry settlements and the conquest of Patras by Constantine. However, in 1446 the Ottomans destroyed the Byzantine defenses at the Hexamilion wall, opening the peninsula to invasion. When the Ottomans captured Constantinople in 1453, Demetrios and Thomas were allowed to continue as vassals. By 1460, they were exiled and the despotate annexed into the empire.

In Achaea, the principality was seized by James of Baux, who in 1374 had become titular Emperor of Constantinople. In 1383, Achaea was annexed by Charles III of Naples, successor and murderer of Joan I of Naples, who was the grandson of John of Durazzo, driving out James of Baux but the Principality was actually ruled by the Navarrese Company and its commanders. In 1404, Centurione II Zaccaria bought the rights of the Principality from King Ladislaus of Naples. Centurione continued to hold the post until 1429, when Thomas Palaiologos conquered the heartland of the principality. Centurione married off his daughter Catherine Zaccaria, to the despot and retreated to the ancestral Messenian castle of the Barony of Arcadia. After his death in 1432, this too was seized by the Byzantines. In 1453 during the great Morean revolt his first-born son John Asen Zaccaria led an uprising against the Palaiologoi. He gained support from Latins, Albanians and Greeks and was proclaimed Prince inside the castle of Aetos. Though Thomas aided by the Ottoman Sultan defeated John and the Zaccaria exiled himself in Modon and then Italy continuing to style himself as Prince of Achaea. The Byzantine reconquest proved short-lived as the Ottomans conquered the despotate in 1460.

The Duchy of Athens was controlled by the Venetians from 1395 to 1402. Antonio I Acciaioli captured Athens in 1402 and the Acropolis in 1403. After the Ottoman loss at the Battle of Ankara in 1402, Antonio and the Venetians separately approached Süleyman Çelebi. with the former trying to gain recognition of his position, the latter seeking to usurp that position. The Ottoman Interreggum precluded any such support. Cardinal Angelo II Acciaioli began negotiations and reached a compromise on 31 March 1405. In 1410, he joined the Ottomans to devastate Venetian Nauplia. In 1419, a peace was reached and Antonio was asked to cease harassing the Venetians. In 1423, he was at war with Morea and occupied Corinth. In 1444, Athens became a tributary of Morea. In 1456, Turahanoğlu Ömer Bey conquered the remnants of the duchy.

=== Serbia, Albania and Bosnia ===
Numerous Ottoman attempts to conquer the Balkans in the 14th century were turned back. Sultan Murad I then led his forces to defeat a Balkan coalition army led by Serbs, supported by Albanians and Bosnians, in the Battle of Kosovo in 1389. This led to the Fall of Serbian Empire shortly thereafter. The Serbian Despotate, a successor of the empires of Serbia and Moravia, lasted for another 60 years, experiencing a cultural, economic and political renaissance, especially during the reign of despot Stefan Lazarević. After the death of Đurađ Branković in 1456, the despotate continued to exist for another three years before it finally fell under Ottoman rule.

The Ottomans first came into Albania by invitation, jointly winning the Battle of Savra on 18 September 1385. Subsequently, they had some influence in Albania but not direct control, establishing the Sanjak of Albania in 1415.

The Albanian revolt of 1432–1436, the first of the series of Albanian-Turkish wars, was led by Gjergj Arianiti. Sultan Murat II gathered a large force under Ali Bey Evrenosoğlu that was ambushed and defeated by Arianiti. This victory prompted the Albanians to call upon Depë Zenebishi to lead the rebels in the south. His forces besieged the southern city of Gjirokastër where Ottoman commander Turahan Bey defeated the troops that surrounded the city in early 1433.

In the summer of 1433, the Ottoman army subdued the rebels in the domains of Gjon Kastrioti, while his son Skanderbeg, who was also called to join the revolt, remained in Ottoman service in Anatolia. In northern Albania, Nicholas Dukagjini recaptured lost territories and captured Dagnum. Dukagjini then tried to ally himself with Venice by offering to accept Venetian suzerainty and granting them control of Dagnum. However, Venice refused any kind of involvement in his plan and the revolt in general.

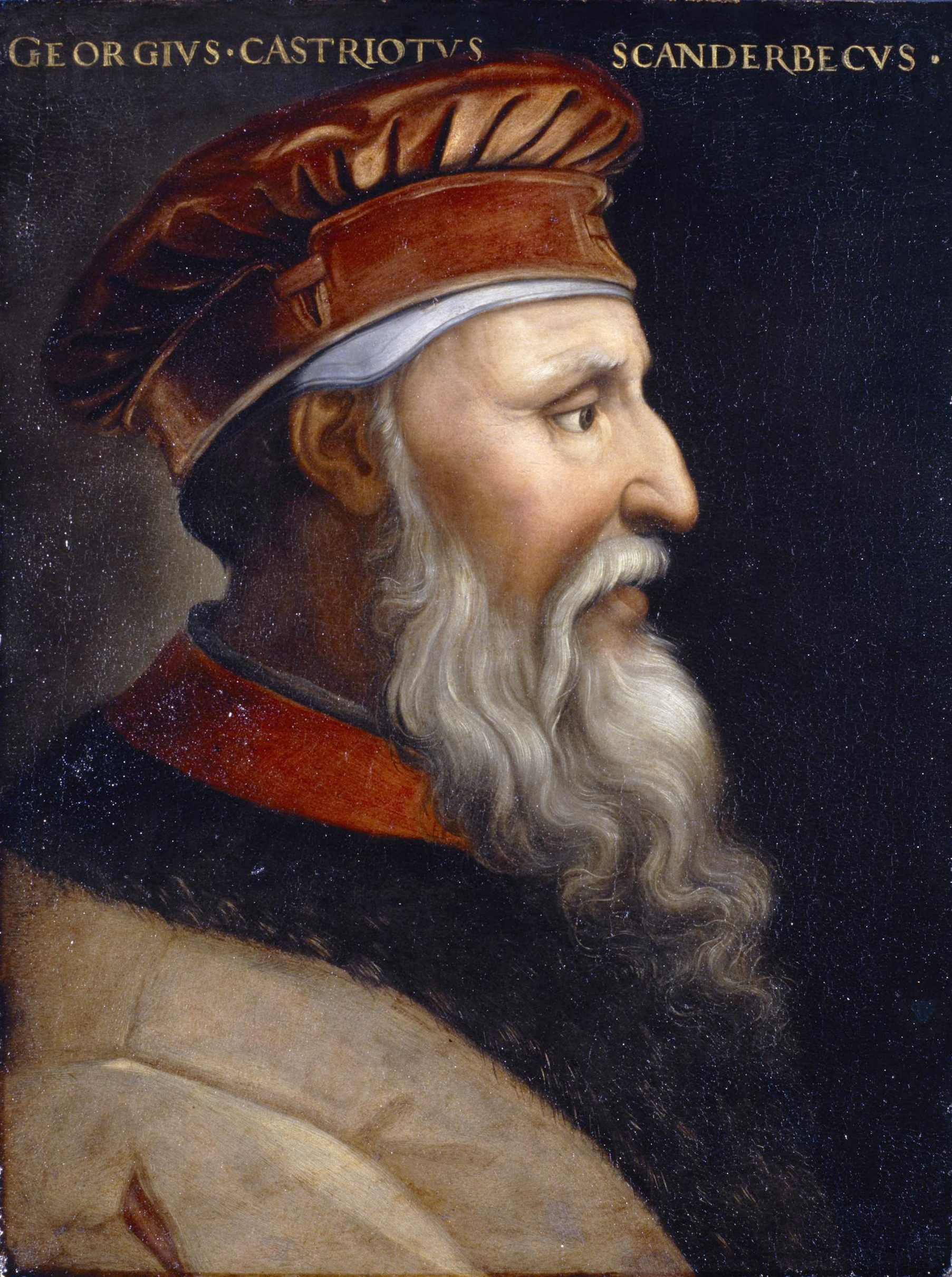
Portrait of Skanderbeg by Cristofano dell'Altissimo

In December 1434, Ishak Bey of Üsküb marched into Albania but was again defeated. In April 1435, Arianiti defeated another Ottoman campaign and hostilities ceased. By mid-1436, Turahan Bey assembled a large force that subdued the revolt and marched through Albania, committing widespread massacres of civilians.

In August 1443, Arianiti again rebelled against Ottomans, urged by the news of defeat of Hadım Şehabeddin. Throughout the winter of 1444, he led an army deep into Macedonia. During the same time, the Ottomans were routed at the Battle of Niš, after which Skanderbeg deserted the Ottoman army and began another rebellion. Skanderbeg eventually allied with Gjergj Arianit in the League of Lezhë.

Skanderbeg's rebellion began soon thereafter, and he was victorious in the Battle of Torvioll on 29 June 1444. Skanderbeg's forces lost the fortress Baleč to Venetian forces in 1448 during Skanderbeg's war against Venice. The Ottoman victory at the Siege of Svetigrad on 31 July 1448 was a setback, but the Albanians were successful in the sixth-month Siege of Krujë on 23 November 1450. The Ottoman army acknowledged that the castle of Krujë would not fall by strength of arms and lifted the siege.

The Treaty of Gaeta between Alfonso V of Aragon (representing the Kingdom of Naples) and the ambassadors of Skanderbeg was signed on 26 March 1451. In the treaty, Skanderbeg recognized himself a vassal of Naples, and in return he would have the kingdom's protection from the Ottomans. Alfonso V believed that he would be able to use Albania as a foothold to further expand his realm into the Balkans and conduct an anti-Turkish crusade. With political and material support from Naples and the Vatican, resistance to the Ottoman Empire continued for 36 years.

The Kingdom of Bosnia lasted from 1377 to 1463. Although Hungarian kings viewed Bosnia as under their sovereignty during this time, Bosnian independence continued. Tvrtko I of Bosnia acquired portions of western Serbia and much of the Adriatic coast, becoming one of the strongest states in the Balkan Peninsula. The Ottoman conquest of Bosnia led to the annexation of much of eastern Bosnia between 1440 and 1451, with the last fortress falling in 1481. The first Ottoman governor of Bosnia was Ishak-Beg, who in 1443 was replaced by Isa-Beg Isaković. The last king of Bosnia was Stephen Tomašević, who was captured by the Ottomans and killed in 1463.

== Spain and Portugal ==
By the 15th century, the Moors' position in Iberia had been significantly reduced due to the successes of the Reconquista. The only holdout was the Emirate of Granada which would fall by the end of the century. The continued efforts by Castile and Aragon, to be united by the end of the century, and Portugal brought to fruition the centuries-old endeavor.

=== Castile ===
The Crown of Castile formed in 1230 as a result of the merging of León and Castile. Henry the Suffering became king in 1390. He supported antipope Benedict XIII and restarted the conflict against the Emirate of Granada, winning a victory at the Battle of Collejares, which freed the town in 1406. In 1402, he sent Hernán Sánchez de Palazuelos and Ruy González de Clavijo as ambassadors to Timur to discuss the possibility of an alliance between the Timurid Empire and Castile against the Ottoman Empire. Unable to procure a letter from Timur for Henry, the Castilians were forced to depart Samarkand on 21 November 1404 due to Timur's impending death.

Henry died on 25 December 1406, while preparing a campaign against Granada. He was succeeded by his son John II of Castile. In 1431, John placed Yusuf IV of Granada on the throne as the sultan of Granada in exchange for tribute and vassal status to Castile. That year, there were several claimants to the throne of Granada. Muhammad IX of Granada had entered Iberia from Tunisia in 1429, with the promise of Castilian support in overthrowing Muhammad VIII of Granada. John II did not decisively support either, instead playing them against each other to obtain greater tribute and the concession of Granada as a vassal of Castile. Muhammad VIII surrendered in 1429 and was killed in March 1431, leaving Muhammad IX on the throne, but without having reached an agreement with Castile. Álvaro de Luna led the Castilian forces against Granada in the Battle of La Higueruela in July 1431, which was a modest success but failed to take Granada. John II continued to demand greater concessions, and would not offer a permanent peace. Instead, he supported Yusuf IV who agreed to tribute and to be John's vassal.

In 1427, Álvaro was expelled by a coalition of the nobles, only to be recalled in the following year. In 1431, he endeavoured to employ the restless nobles in a campaign for the reconquest of Granada, the remaining territory of Muslim Spain and then ruled by the sultan Muhammed IX. Some successes were gained at the Battle of La Higueruela, but in the end Álvaro failed. A consistent policy was impossible with a rebellious aristocracy and a king of indolent character.

In 1445, the faction of nobles allied with Álvaro's main enemies, the Infantes of Aragon, were defeated at the First Battle of Olmedo. One of them, Infante Henry, Duke of Villena, brother of the queen, died of his wounds. Álvaro, who had been Constable of Castile and Count of San Esteban de Gormaz since 1423, became Grand Master of the Order of Santiago by election of the knights.

In 1454, John II died and was succeeded by Henry the Impotent, the last of the weak late-medieval kings of Castile and León. During Henry's reign, the nobles became more powerful and the nation became less centralised. Henry convened the Cuéllar Courts to launch an offensive against the Emirate of Granada. The campaigns of 1455 and 1458 developed into a war of attrition based on punitive raids and avoiding pitched battles.

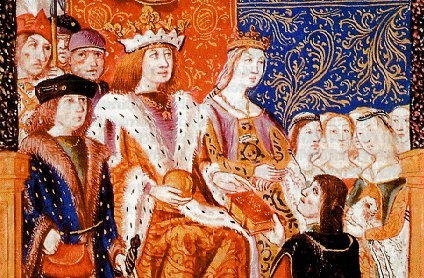
Ferdinand and Isabella with their subjects

Isabella I of Castile and Ferdinand II of Aragon then reigned jointly over a dynastically unified Spanish Empire. Together they are known as the Catholic Monarchs. At the end of the Reconquista, only Granada was left for Isabella and Ferdinand to conquer. Granada had been held by the Nasrid dynasty since the mid-13th century. Protected by natural barriers and fortified towns, it had withstood the long process of the Reconquista. On 1 February 1482, the king and queen reached Medina del Campo and this is generally considered the beginning of the War of Granada. While Isabella's and Ferdinand's involvement in the war was apparent from the start, Granada's leadership was divided and never able to present a united front. It still took ten years to conquer Granada, culminating in a Spanish victory in 1492.

=== Aragon ===
The Crown of Aragon originated with the dynastic union of Aragon and Barcelona. Martin the Humane became king in 1396 and launched crusades against the Moors in North Africa in 1398 and 1399. In addition, Aragon had conquered most of Sardinia, but the independent principality of Arborea became a fortress of rebellion. The Aragonese were driven back by Eleanor of Arborea and Sardinia was nearly lost. Martin sent his son Martin the Younger, then king of Sicily, to reconquer Sardinia. He won the Battle of Sanluri in 1409, drove away the Genoese allies of the Sardinians, and subjugated a vast number of Sardinian nobles. This soon resulted in Arborea's total loss of independence.

Ferdinand I of Aragon was the nephew of Martin the Humane and defeated the Emirate of Granada in the Battle of Antequera on 16 September 1410. After a four-month siege, the city capitulated to a Castilian army led by the infante Ferdinand. The Muslim population was forced to leave the town. They surrendered the castle and their Christian slaves in exchange for being allowed to carry their goods out of the city. For two days, they were able to sell their properties and the town was resettled with a Christian population. Up until 1487, Antequera was attached to Seville.

After Ferdinand's uncle Martin died without surviving legitimate issue, Ferdinand was chosen king in 1412 to succeed him in the Compromise of Caspe. The success at Antequera was the last important event in the Reconquista in the 15th century prior to the War of Granada.

When Ferdinand died in 1416, he was succeeded by his son Alfonso V of Aragon. After being taken captive at the Battle of Ponza in 1435, the kingdoms of Naples and Sicily, divided since the Sicilian Vespers, were reunited under Alfonso's dominion. The First Battle of Olmedo between Aragon and Castile took place on 19 May 1445, prompted by the decrees of John II of Castile and his aide Álvaro de Luna. John II of Aragon, then king of Navarre, invaded Castile aided by his brother Alfonso V. John II of Castile met the invasion at Olmedo, where he was successful. Henry of Aragon, the younger brother of Alfonso and John, died of his wounds a few days later in Calatayud.

John II of Aragon succeeded his brother as king of Aragon in 1458 and was embroiled in local intrigue. In 1479, the new dynastic union of Ferdinand II of Aragon with the Isabella I of Castile was formed.

=== Portugal ===
In 1383, a faction of petty noblemen and commoners, led by John of Aviz and commanded by General Nuno Álvares Pereira defeated the Castilians in the Battle of Aljubarrota. He became king of Portugal in 1385 and ruled in peace, pursuing the economic development of his realm. The only significant military action was the Conquest of Ceuta in 1415. With this, he aimed to control navigation of the African coast. But in the broader perspective, this was the first step opening the Arab world to medieval Europe, which in fact led to the Age of Discovery with Portuguese explorers sailing across the world.

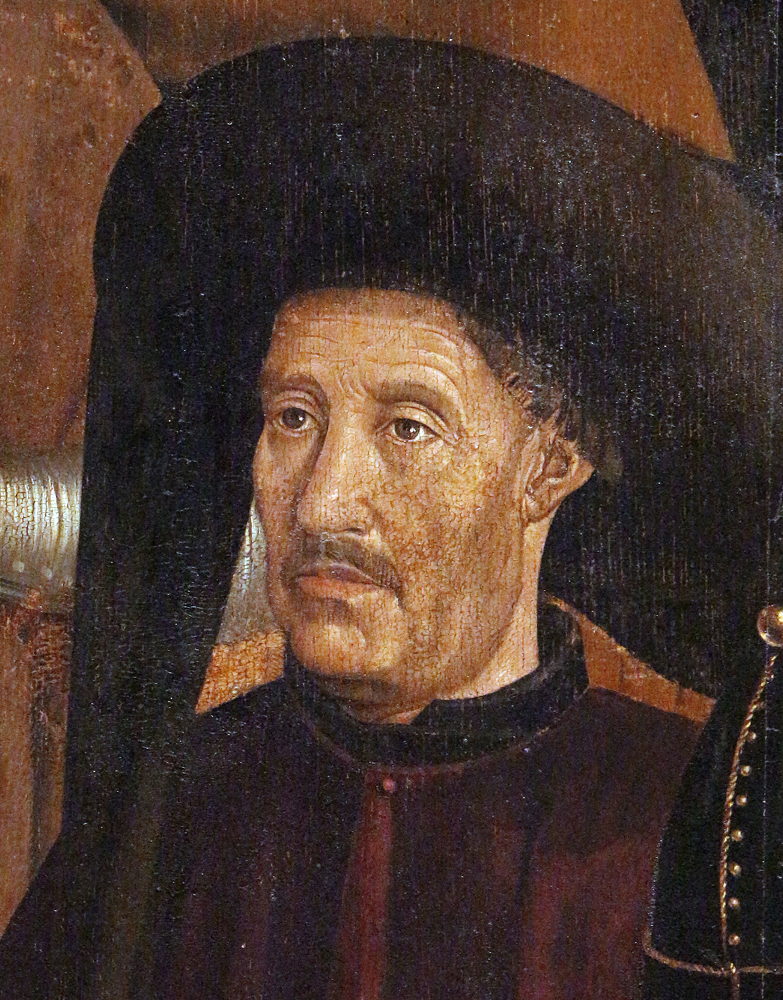
Henry the Navigator

By the time John was succeeded by his son Edward the Elegant in 1433, the colony at Ceuta had become a burden, and it was realised that without the city of Tangier, possession of Ceuta was worthless. In 1437, the resulting Battle of Tangier was a debacle for Portugal. Edward's son and successor Alfonso the African served from 1438 to 1477 and established Portugal as the lead in European exploration of the world and the Age of Discovery. Prince Henry the Navigator, son of John I of Portugal, became the main sponsor and patron of this endeavour.

== Islamic Dynasties ==
Since the Eighth Crusade in the later 13th century, the Mamluks were the principal Muslim threat to the Western powers. They would soon be supplanted by the Ottomans and, for a brief time, the Timurids. The Aq Qoyunlu would also dominate in Anatolia and Persia. In Iberia, al-Andalus was ruled by the Nasrids, while across the Mediterranean, the Marinids ruled Morocco.

=== Mamluks ===
The Burji dynasty ruled the Mamluk Sultanate of Egypt from 1382 until 1517. Barquq was the founder of the dynasty and was the first sultan of Circassian origins. In 1393, Barquq joined an alliance with the Ottomans to jointly oppose Timur with his intention to invade Syria. Barquq was succeeded by his son an-Nasir Faraj in 1399 and soon had to deal with the Siege of Damascus in 1400, in which the city was lost to the Timurids. Faraj's death in 1412 led to a series of ineffectual sultans, with nine serving over the next decade.

In 1422, the former slave Barsbay became sultan. During his tenure, the Mamluk campaigns against Cyprus of 1424–1426 occurred. After Barsbay's death in 1438, his son al-Aziz Jamal was briefly sultan, but was soon replaced by Sayf ad-Din Jaqmaq, a former atabeg to Faraj, who overthrew the 15-year old Jamal. Jaqmaq had to deal with piracy from Cyprus and Rhodes. In 1439, he launched an unsuccessful campaign against the two islands. A second failure in 1442 encouraged him to build a fleet capable of leading an assault against Rhodes. In July 1444, his fleet began the Siege of Rhodes which was unable to take the fortress. After that failure, Jaqmaq remained in peace with his neighbors.

Jamaq stepped down as sultan just weeks before his death, elevating his son al-Mansur Fakhr-ad-Din Uthman for a short reign. He was usurped by his atabeg Sayf ad-Din Inal in 1453. Friendly relations with the expanding Ottoman Empire were fostered and the Fall of Constantinople was celebrated in Cairo. The two sultanates exchanged ambassadors and Inal sent his personal congratulations to Mehmed II. In June 1457, Inal sent an expeditionary force to attack the Karamanids, leading to a Mamluk victory over Ibrahim II of Karaman in April 1458. In 1458, Inal received James II of Cyprus who hoped to wrest the Cypriot throne from his half-sister Charlotte of Cyprus. Toward that end a naval fleet was launched on 5 August 1460, but failed to install James as king. One day before his death, Inal installed his son al-Mu'ayyad Shihab al-Din Ahmad as sultan, who served but four months.

Al-Mu'ayyad was replaced as sultan by his atabeg and captor Sayf ad-Din Khushqadam. The new sultan was a Greek, and so was met with resistance among the entrenched Egyptians. Quelling the internal strife, he continued Inal's policies towards Cyprus. The Karamanid succession led to a parting of ways with Mehmed II. When Ibrahim II died in 1464, Pir Ahmet of Karaman tried to ascend to throne. But his half brother Ishak of Karaman who was the legal heir, struggled for the throne and became bey with the support of Khushqadam and Uzun Hasan, sultan of the Aq Qoyunlu. Pir Ahmet asked Mehmet II for support in exchange for part of his beylik. With Ottoman support, he defeated his brother in battle at Dağpazarı.

Sayf ad-Din Bilbay served as sultan for a few months after the death of Khushqadam in 1467, but was soon transplanted by Timurbugha, who again served only a short time. He was succeeded by Qaitbay who was a former slave of Barsbay. Qaitbay was proclaimed sultan in January 1468 and lasted nearly 29 years, the longest and most consequential of the Circassian sultans.

Qaitbay's first major challenge was the insurrection of Shah Suwar, leader of the Dhu'l-Qadrids, a Turkmen dynasty in eastern Anatolia. The first expedition against them was soundly defeated, and Suwar threatened to invade Syria. A second Mamluk army was sent in 1469, but was likewise defeated. In 1471 a third expedition succeeded in routing Suwar's army. Suwar and his brothers were captured and were drawn and quartered and their remains were hung from Bab Zuwayla. At the same time, Qaitbay had to deal with the Aq Qoyunlu leader Uzun Hasan who had been masquerading as his loyal vassal during the dealings with Shah Suwar. The 1473 Battle of Otlukbeli with the Aq Qoyunlu foreshadowed the Ottoman–Mamluk War, which was begun in 1485, leading to a truce of status quo ante bellum in 1491 which would last for two decades.

=== Ottomans ===
In the century after its formation, Ottoman rule had begun to extend over Anatolia and the Balkans. The timeline of the Ottoman Empire shows the earliest conflicts beginning during the Byzantine–Ottoman Wars, waged in Anatolia in the late 13th century before entering Europe in the mid-14th century. This was followed by the Bulgarian–Ottoman Wars and the Serbian–Ottoman Wars waged beginning in the mid-14th century. Much of this period was characterised by Ottoman expansion into the Balkans. The capture of the northwestern Anatolian city of Bursa in 1326 formed the new capital of the Ottoman state and supplanted Byzantine control in the region. The important port city of Thessaloniki was captured from the Venetians in 1387 and sacked. The Ottoman victory in the Battle of Kosovo on 15 June 1389 effectively marked Fall of the Serbian Empire in the region, paving the way for Ottoman expansion into Europe.

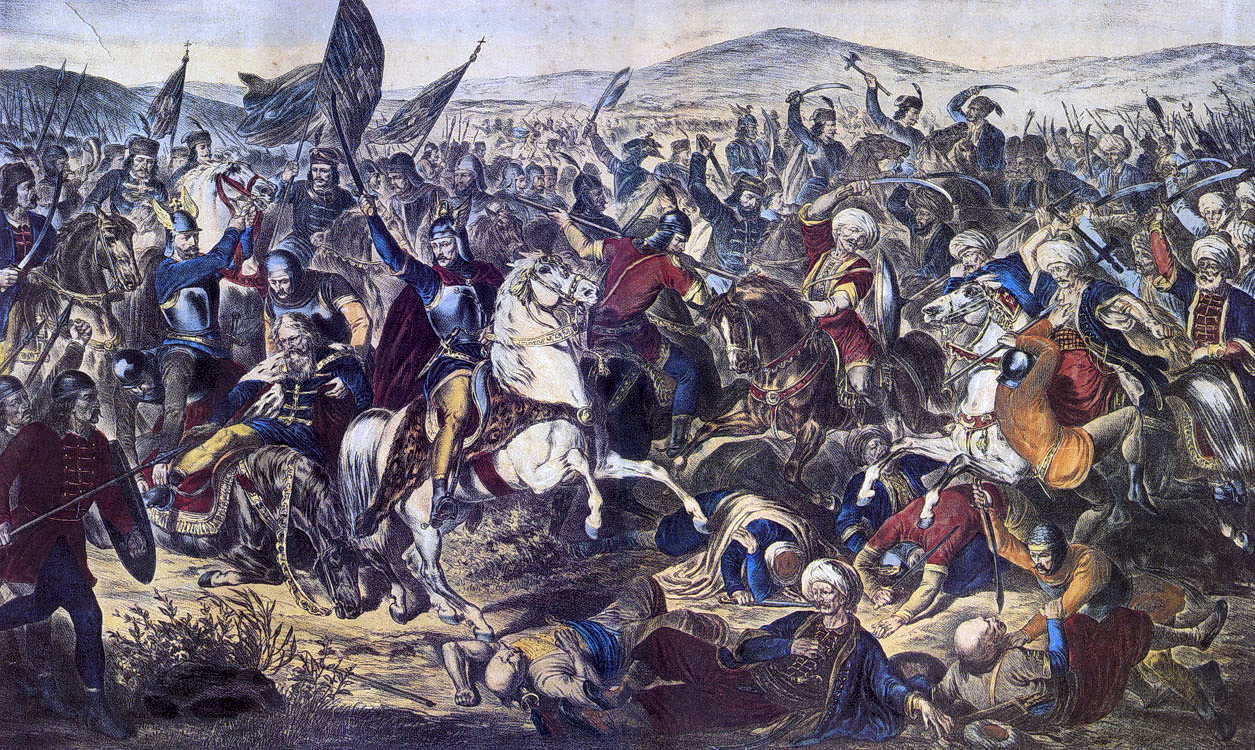
Battle of Kosovo, by Adam Stefanović (1870)

==== Bayezid I ====
In 1389, Bayezid I ascended to the throne following the death of his father Murad I at Kosovo. Bayezid embarked on a campaign to unify Anatolia under the Ottomans, which was successful until the Battle of Kırkdilim in 1392. In 1394, Bayezid crossed the Danube to attack Wallachia and again was stopped at the Battle of Rovine.

Bayezid began the construction of the Anadoluhisarı fortress as part of preparations for the Siege of Constantinople, which began in 1394. On the urgings of Manuel II Palaeologus, the Crusade of Nicopolis was organized to defeat him. In 1396, the crusader army under the leadership of Sigismund of Luxembourg was formed. The Ottomans were led by Bayezid and the Serbian prince Stefan Lazarević. In one of the last large-scale crusades, the Christian forces were soundly defeated in the Battle of Nicopolis on 25 September 1396.

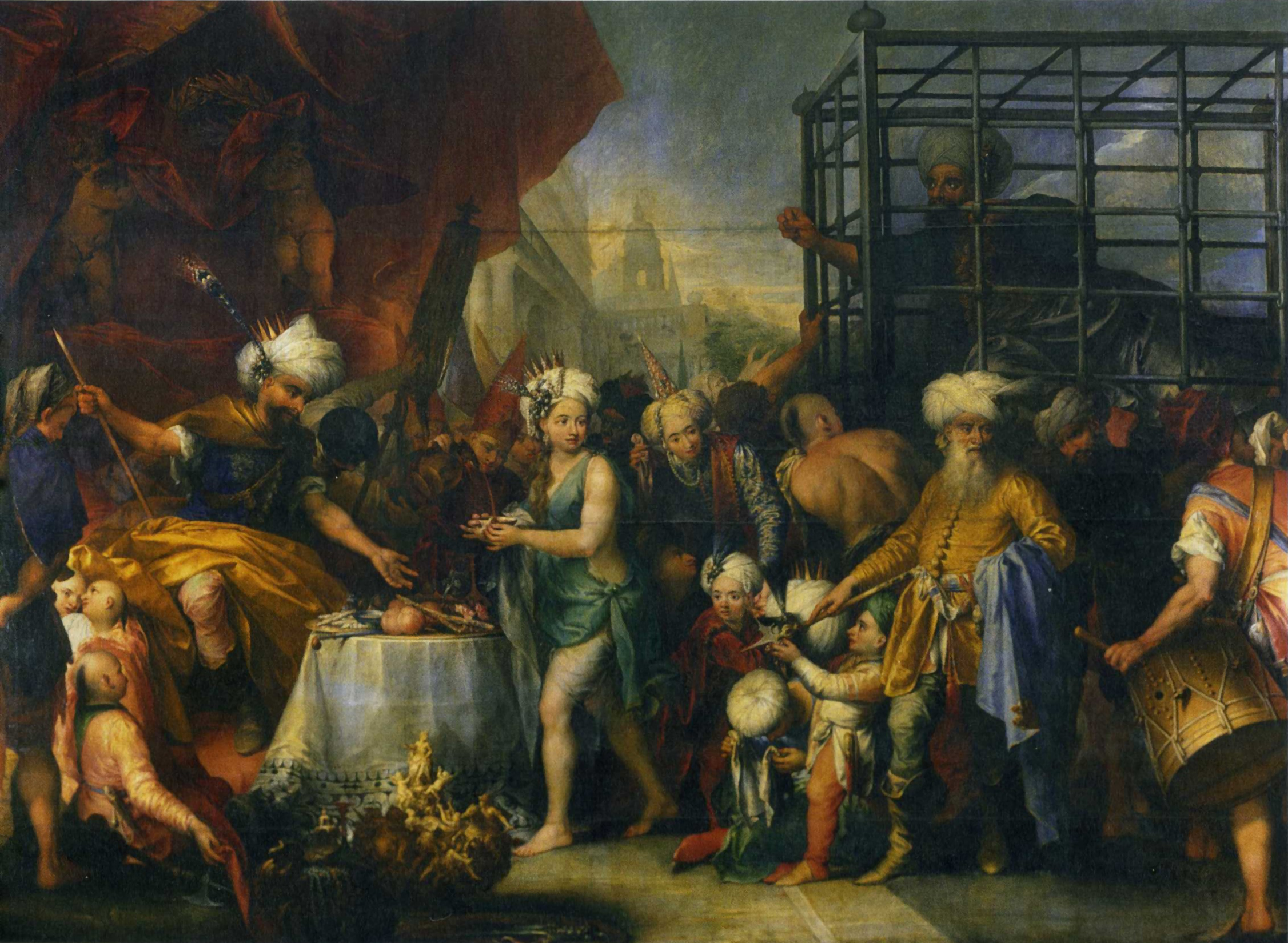
Humiliation of Despina and Bayezid, by Andrea Celesti

Timur had defeated the Mamluks at the Siege of Damascus in 1400, and then turned his attention to the Ottomans. In 1402, Bayezid broke off his Siege of Constantinople and marched to Ankara. The resulting Battle of Ankara on 20 July 1402 was resounding victory for the Timurids. Bayezid and his wife Olivera were captured, with the sultan dying in captivity in 1403. This was followed by Siege of Smyrna in December 1402 in which Timur defeated the Hospitallers, taking the city held by them since 1344.

==== Ottoman Interregnum ====
The Ottoman Interregnum followed the Ottoman defeat at Ankara. Although Mehmed Çelebi was confirmed as sultan by Timur, his brothers İsa Çelebi, Musa Çelebi, Süleyman Çelebi, and later, Mustafa Çelebi, refused to recognize his authority, each claiming the throne for himself. Civil war was the result. The Interregnum lasted eleven years, until the Battle of Çamurlu on 5 July 1413, when Mehmed Çelebi emerged as victor.

==== Mehmed I ====
After winning the Interregnum, Mehmed crowned himself sultan in Edirne that lay in the European part of the empire, becoming Mehmed I. He consolidated his power, made Edirne the most important of the dual capitals, and conquered parts of Albania, the Beylik of Isfendiyar, and the Armenian Kingdom of Cilicia from the Mamluks. Taking his many achievements into consideration, Mehmed is widely known as the second founder of the Ottoman Sultanate.

==== Murad II ====
Murad II succeeded his father in 1421. He then formed a new army called Azeb and, in 1422, began the Siege of Constantinople. Murad was forced to lift the siege due to the rebellion of his younger brother Küçük Mustafa in Anatolia. When Murad caught Mustafa, he had him executed, and the Anatolian beyliks that had been constantly plotting against him — Aydinids, Germiyanids, Menteshe and Teke — were annexed. Murad II then declared war against Venice who withdrew in 1432 following the defeat at the Siege of Thessalonica in 1430. The Ottomans under Murad II won the Crusade of Varna in 1443–1444.

Murad II relinquished his throne in 1444 to his son Mehmed II, but a Janissary revolt in the empire forced him to return. In 1448, he defeated the Christian coalition at the Second Battle of Kosovo. When the Balkan front was secured, Murad II turned east to defeat Timur's son Shah Rokh and Karamanid emir İbrahim Bey. In 1450, Murad II invaded Albania and led the unsuccessful Siege of Krujë in an effort to defeat the resistance led by Skanderbeg. In the winter of 1450–1451, Murad II fell ill, and died in Edirne. He was succeeded by Mehmed II.

==== Mehmed the Conqueror ====
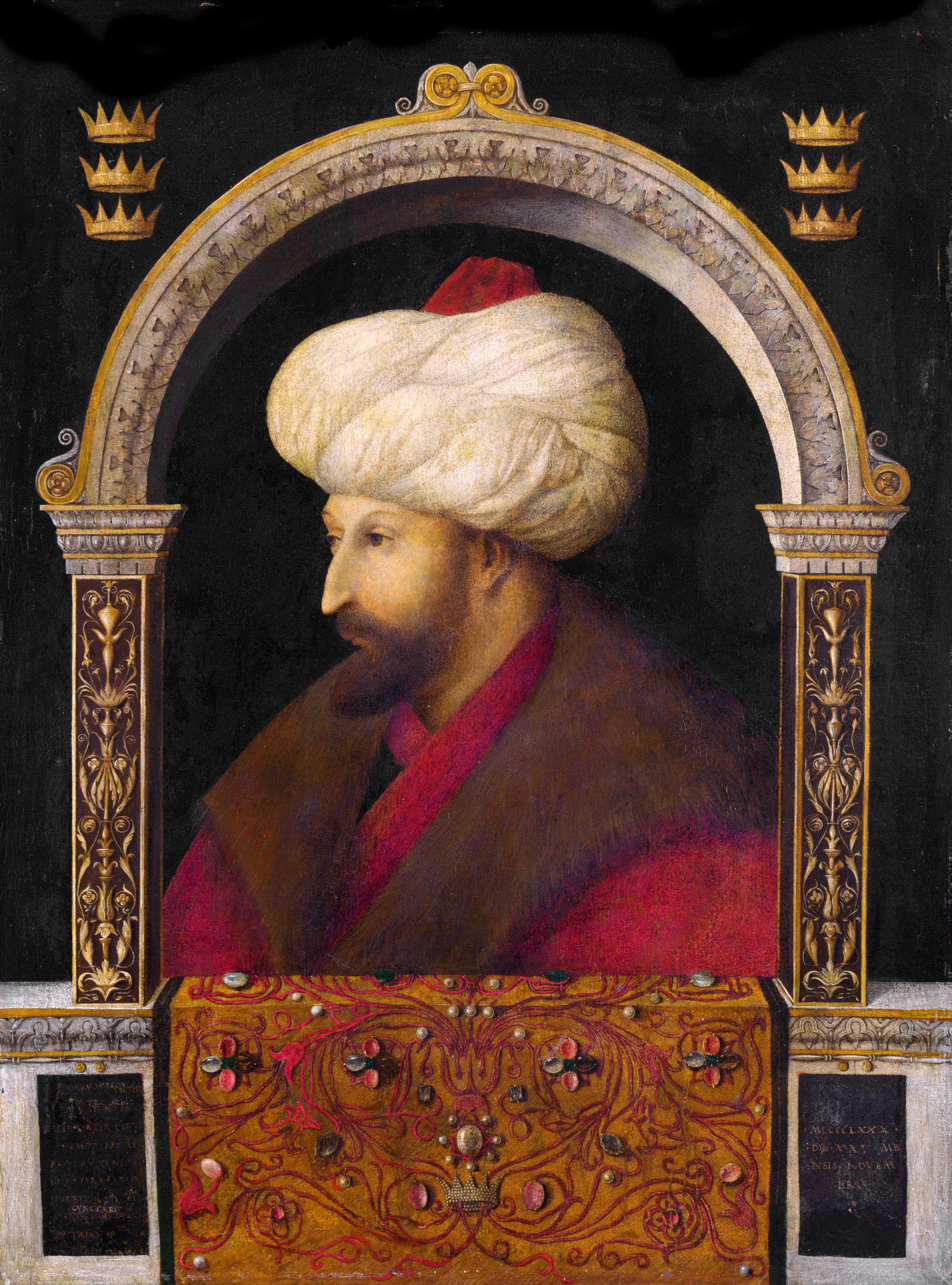
Portrait of Mehmed II by Gentile Bellini dated 1480

Mehmed II was known as Mehmed the Conqueror and served as Ottoman sultan from August 1444 to September 1446 and then from February 1451 to May 1481. In his first reign, he defeated the crusade led by John Hunyadi after the Hungarian incursions into his country broke the conditions of the truce Peace of Szeged. When he ascended the throne again in 1451, he strengthened the Ottoman navy and brought about the Fall of Constantinople and thus an end to the Byzantine Empire. Mehmed II viewed the Ottoman state as a continuation of the Roman Empire for the remainder of his life, seeing himself as continuing the Empire rather than replacing it. The list of Ottoman conquests under Mehmed II stretches from 1451 to 1478.

The Ottoman Empire of the Classical Age experienced dramatic territorial growth. The period opened with the conquest of Constantinople in 1453. Mehmed II went on to consolidate the empire's position in the Balkans and Anatolia, conquering Serbia in 1454–1455, the Peloponnese in 1458–1459, Trebizond in 1461, and Bosnia in 1463. Many Venetian territories in Greece were conquered during the Ottoman-Venetian War of 1463–1479. By 1474 the Ottomans had conquered their Anatolian rival, the Karamanids, and in 1475 conquered Kaffa on the Crimean Peninsula, establishing the Crimean Khanate as a vassal state. In 1480 an invasion of Otranto in Italy was launched, but the death of Mehmed II the following year led to an Ottoman withdrawal.

==== Bayezid II ====
After the death of Mehmed II, his son Bayezid II became sultan and his reign was one of consolidation after the rapid conquests of the previous era, and the empire's territory was expanded only marginally. In 1484 Bayezid led a campaign against Moldavia, subjecting it to vassal status and annexing the strategic ports of Kilia and Akkerman. The Ottoman–Mamluk War began in 1485. By 1491, the Mamluks were weary of the war and the Ottomans grew concerned over a possible crusade directed against them. The inconclusive conflict ended with a treaty which fixed their mutual border at the Gülek Pass. Major Venetian ports were conquered in Greece and Albania during the Ottoman–Venetian War of 1499–1503, most significantly Modon, Koron, and Durazzo. However, by the end of his reign, Ottoman territory in the east was coming under threat from the newly established Safavid Empire.

=== Timurids ===
The Timurid Empire was founded by Timur, a warlord of Turco-Mongol lineage, who led the empire between 1370 and his death in 1405. Timur's victory over Tokhtamysh, khan of the Golden Horde, in the Tokhtamysh–Timur war from 1386 to 1385 led to his envisioning himself as the great restorer of the Mongol Empire. This was in conjunction with the Timurid invasions of Georgia from 1386 to 1403 that were only partially successful. Timurid relations with Europe were also pursued against the common Ottoman enemy.

Timur then turned his attention to Syria, leading the successful Sack of Aleppo and Siege of Damascus. He invaded Baghdad in June 1401. Finally, Timur invaded Anatolia and defeated Bayezid I in the Battle of Ankara on 20 July 1402. Bayezid was captured in battle and subsequently died in captivity, initiating the twelve-year Ottoman Interregnum. In December 1402, Timur launched the successful Siege of Smyrna, a stronghold of the Hospitallers. A mass beheading of the defenders was carried out in Smyrna by Timur's soldiers.

After Timur's death in 1405, his descendants ruler the empire which gradually fragmented. By 1469, the ruling Timurid dynasty had lost most of Persia to the Aq Qoyunlu confederation, a struggle which culminated in the Battle of Qarabagh. However, members of the Timurid dynasty continued to rule smaller states, the Timurid emirates, in Central Asia and parts of India. In the early 16th century, Babur, a descendant of both Timur and Genghis Khan from Ferghana, invaded Kabulistan and established a small kingdom there. Twenty years later, he used this kingdom as a staging ground to invade the Delhi Sultanate in India and establish the Mughal Empire.

Timurid emirs of the 15th century
Name	Tenure
Timur	1370–1405
Khalil Sultan	1405–1409
Shah Rukh	1405–1447
Ulugh Beg	1447–1449
Abdal-Latif Mirza	1449–1450
Abdullah Mirza	1450–1451
Abu Sa'id Mirza	1451–1469
Umar Shaikh Mirza II	1469–1494
Babur	1494–1530

=== Emirate of Granada ===
The Emirate of Granada in the southern Iberian Peninsula was the last independent Muslim state in Western Europe. In the 13th century, the Almohad Caliphate in Morocco ruled the remaining Muslim territories in southern Iberia and from 1237 to 1239, the Nasrid dynasty seized Granada, Almería, and Málaga. By 1250, Granada was the only remaining Muslim province and a vassal of the rising Crown of Castile.

Muhammad VII of Granada was the twelfth Nasrid ruler of Granada serving 1392–1408. In 1394, he defeated an invasion by the Order of Alcántara known as the Crusade of 1394. This nearly escalated to a wider war, but Muhammad and Henry III of Castile were able to restore peace. He was succeeded by his brother Yusuf III of Granada and then Muhammad VIII of Granada. This was followed by the intermittent rule of Muhammad IX of Granada who was defeated by Castile at the Battle of Los Alporchones on 17 March 1452.

Muhammad XI of Granada ruled Granada during the Granada War, a series of military campaigns between 1482 and 1491 during the reign of the Isabella I of Castile and Ferdinand II of Aragon. It ended with the defeat of Granada and its annexation by Castile, ending the last remnant of Islamic rule of al-Andalus.

=== Marinid Sultanate ===
In 1244, the Marinids overthrew the Almohad Caliphate which had controlled Morocco for over a century. At the height of their power in the mid-14th century, the Marinid dynasty briefly held sway over most of the Maghreb and provided key support to the Emirate of Granada. They attempted to gain a foothold on the European side of the Strait of Gibraltar but were defeated first at the Battle of Río Salado in 1340 and then at the Siege of Algeciras in 1344.

Abu Sa'id Uthman III was Marinid ruler of Morocco from 1398 to 1420, the last effective ruler of that dynasty. His forces were involved in an unsuccessful attempt to acquire Gibraltar from Granada in 1410. In 1415, after the Portuguese conquest of Ceuta, he failed in an attempt to recover the city in the Siege of Ceuta, and was assassinated shortly thereafter. He was succeeded by his son Abd al-Haqq II who served as sultan beginning in 1420 under the regency of a Wattasid vizier, and later was nominal sultan under Wattasid control until 1465.

The Moroccan-Portuguese conflicts would continue, punctuated by the defeat of Henry the Navigator at the Battle of Tangier in 1437. Al-Haqq II, the last Marinid sultan, was overthrown and killed in the 1465 Moroccan Revolt. This led to the establishment of direct Wattasid rule over most of Morocco. Portugal would eventually take Tangier in 1471.

=== Aq Qoyunlu ===
The Aq Qoyunlu, or the White Sheep Turkomans, were a tribal confederation founded in Diyar Bakir by Uthman Beg. They ruled parts of present-day eastern Turkey from 1378 to 1503, and in their last decades also ruled Armenia, Azerbaijan, much of Iran, Iraq, and Oman. The Aq Qoyunlu empire reached its zenith under Uzun Hasan.

The Aq Qoyunlu first acquired land in 1402, when Timur granted them all of Diyar Bakr. They were unable to expand their territory into that of their rivals, the Qara Qoyunlu, or Black Sheep Turkomans. In November 1467, Uzun Hasan defeated the Black Sheep in a sudden attack at the Battle of Chapakchur. The Black Sheep sultan Jahan Shah was killed in the battle while his son Mirza Yusuf was captured. After the death of Jahan Shah, his son Hasan Ali, with the help of Timurid sultan Abu Sa'id Mirza, marched on Azerbaijan to meet Uzun Hasan. In the ensuing disastrous Battle of Qarabagh, Abu Sa'id suffered heavy losses and was taken prisoner and was executed on 8 February 1469. Uzun Hasan sent his severed head to Mamluk sultan Qaitbay.

== Polish–Lithuanian–Teutonic War ==
The Polish–Lithuanian–Teutonic War occurred between 1409 and 1411 between the Teutonic Knights and the allied Kingdom of Poland and Grand Duchy of Lithuania. Inspired by the local uprising, the war began with a Teutonic invasion of Poland in August 1409. As neither side was ready for a full-scale war, Wenceslaus IV of Bohemia brokered a nine-month truce. After the truce expired in June 1410, the Teutons were decisively defeated at the Battle of Grunwald, one of the largest battles of medieval Europe, with most of their leadership killed or taken prisoner. The Teutons never recovered their former power, and the financial burden of war reparations caused internal conflicts and economic decline in their lands. The war shifted the balance of power in Central Europe and marked the rise of the Polish–Lithuanian Union as the dominant power in the region.

=== Origins of the conflict ===
The Christianization of Lithuania removed the religious rationale for the Order's activities in Central Europe. However the Teutons responded by publicly contesting the sincerity of the conversion of Władysław II Jagiełło, bringing the charge to a papal court. Territorial disputes continued over the Lithuanian region of Samogitia, which was placed in Teutonic hands by Vytautas, cousin of Władysław. Poland also had territorial claims in Dobrzyń Land and Gdańsk, but the two states were largely at peace since the Treaty of Kalisz of 1343. The conflict was also motivated by trade considerations: the Teutons controlled lower reaches of the three largest rivers –– Neman, Vistula and Daugava –– in Poland and Lithuania.

There were two Samogitian uprisings against the Teutonic Knights in 1401–1404 and 1409. After Samogitia had been granted to the Teutons by Vytautas, in order to enlist their support for his other military affairs, the local population resisted Teutonic rule and asked Vytautas to protect them. Vytautas' cousin Švitrigaila joined the war in January 1402 on the side of the Teutonic Knights as he laid claims to the throne of Lithuania. The first uprising was unsuccessful and the Peace of Raciąż was concluded on 22 May 1404.

In 1408, Vytautas and Władysław met in Navahrudak and agreed to support the Samogitians and provoke the Teutons into declaring war against Poland. Poland had its own territorial quarrels with the Knights over the Dobrzyń Land and wanted to diminish Prussian influence in Lithuania while preserving the Polish–Lithuanian Union. Samogitians, angered by a famine in 1408, rose again on 26 May 26, 1409. When the Teutons threatened to invade Lithuania, Poland declared its support to the Lithuanian cause and threatened to invade Prussia in return. In August 1409, the Teutonic Knights declared war against Poland, which began the Polish–Lithuanian–Teutonic War.

=== Battle of Grunwald ===
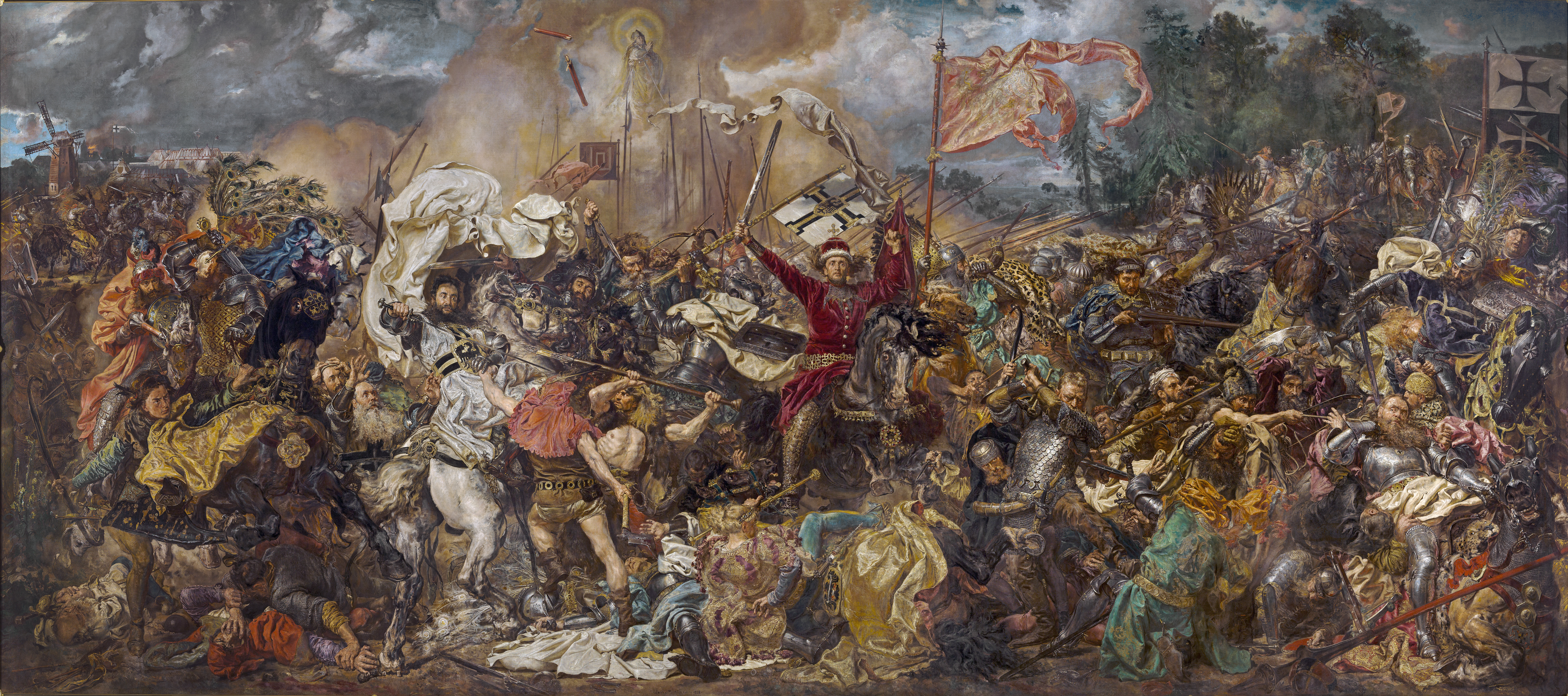
Battle of Grunwald, 1410. Painting by Jan Matejko

Władysław and Vytautas agreed that their armies would unite into a single massive force and march together towards Marienburg, capital of the Teutonic Knights. Grand Master Ulrich of Jungingen did not expect a joint attack and took a defensive position to defend against a dual invasion – by the Poles along the Vistula River towards Gdańsk and by the Lithuanians along the Neman River towards Ragnit.

Wenceslaus agreed to mediate the dispute and a truce was signed on 8 October 1409, set to expire on 24 June 1410. The Battle of Grunwald was fought on 15 July 1410 and the Polish-Lithuanian alliance decisively defeated the Teutonic Knights. Ulrich of Jungingen and most of the Teutonic Order's leadership were killed or taken prisoner. The battle was one of the largest in medieval Europe. The battle is viewed as one of the most important victories in the histories of Poland and Lithuania.

=== Siege of Marienburg ===
After the battle, the Polish and Lithuanian forces delayed their attack on the Teutonic capital in Marienburg, remaining on the battlefield for three days. The main forces did not reach the heavily fortified capital until 26 July 1410, beginning the Siege of Marienburg. This delay gave Henry of Plauen, recently elected Grand Master, enough time to organize a defense. The besiegers expected capitulation and were not prepared for a long-term engagement, suffering from lack of ammunition, low morale, and an epidemic of dysentery. The nobles wanted to return home for the harvest and the mercenaries wanted to get paid. Lithuanian troops, commanded by Vytautas, were the first to withdraw. The siege was eventually lifted on 19 September 1410. The Polish–Lithuanian forces returned home, leaving Polish garrisons in fortresses that surrendered or were captured.

=== Aftermath ===
The Polish–Lithuanian–Teutonic War was formally ended by the Peace of Thorn. It was signed on 1 February 1411 in Thorn, one of the southernmost cities of the State of the Teutonic Knights. The treaty is regarded as a diplomatic failure of Poland–Lithuania as they failed to capitalize on their decisive victory at Grunwald. The Knights returned Dobrzyń Land which they captured from Poland during the war. They also made only temporary territorial concessions in Samogitia, which returned to Lithuania only for the lifetimes of Władysław II Jagiełło and Grand Duke Vytautas. The Peace of Thorn was not stable. It took two other brief wars, the Hunger War in 1414 and Gollub War in 1422, to bring about the peace. The Treaty of Melno, negotiated by Grand Master Paul of Rusdorf, was signed on 27 September 1422, resolving the territorial disputes. However, large war reparations were a significant financial burden on the Order, causing internal unrest and economic decline. The Teutonic Knights never recovered their former might.

== Moroccan–Portuguese conflicts ==
The Moroccan–Portuguese conflicts were a series of battles between Morocco and Portugal throughout the 15th and 16th centuries. The first military action was a surprise assault on Ceuta in 1415, capturing the city for the Portuguese. It was later followed by a counterattack in 1419 and numerous assaults on Tangier and other cities. These events marked the beginning of the decline of the Marinid Sultanate and the start of the colonial Portuguese Empire.

=== Conquest of Ceuta ===
Ceuta was a north African coastal city strategically located on the Strait of Gibraltar that was controlled by the Marinid Sultanate. John I of Portugal began planning the gaining Ceuta as early as 1409. John's son Edward the Eloquent, later king of Portugal, and Henry the Navigator eagerly supported the project, as the prospect of taking Ceuta was viewed as a significant financial opportunity.

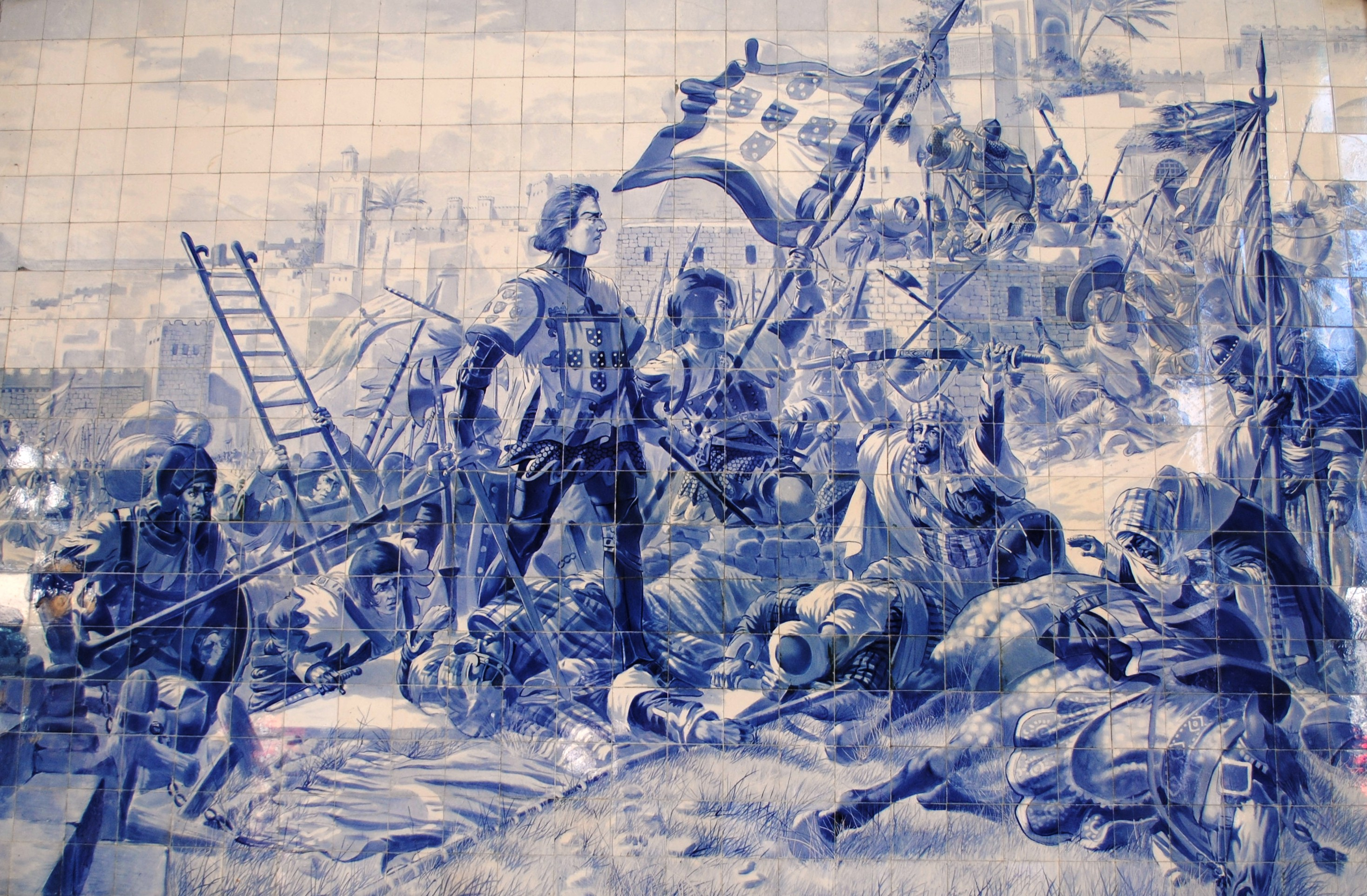
Henry the Navigator during the conquest of Ceuta, by Jorge Colaço

On the morning of 21 August 1415, the Conquest of Ceuta began. As the king boarded a longboat to be taken ashore, he was wounded in a leg. Henry was signalled to lead the troops ashore instead. That morning, Ceuta was entirely in Portuguese hands.

In 1419, the Marinid sultan Abu Said Uthman III laid the Siege of Ceuta with the help of the Emir of Granada Muhammad VIII in an attempt to recover it. The Portuguese successfully repulsed the attack under the command of Dom Pedro de Meneses. Blamed for losing Ceuta, the sultan was later assassinated when a coup took place in Fez in 1420, leaving only the child Abd al-Haqq II as his heir. Morocco descended into anarchy, as rival pretenders vied for the throne and local governors carved out regional fiefs for themselves, selling their support to the highest bidder. The political crisis in Morocco released the pressure on Ceuta for the next few years.

=== Battle of Tangier ===
The colony at Ceuta rapidly became a financial drain on Portugal, and it was realized that without the city of Tangier, possession of Ceuta was worthless. After the capture of Ceuta, the camel caravans that were part of the overland trade routes began to use Tangier as their new destination. This deprived Ceuta of the materials and goods that made it a successful trading locale, and it became an isolated community.

In 1437, the brothers of Edward the Eloquent –– Henry the Navigator and Ferdinand the Saint Prince –– persuaded him to launch an attack on the Marinid sultanate of Morocco. The expedition was not unanimously supported and was undertaken against the advice of pope Eugene IV. Nevertheless, the first Battle of Tangier was launched. The Portuguese expeditionary force, led by Henry set out from Portugal in August 1437, intending to seize a series of Moroccan coastal citadels. The Portuguese laid siege to Tangier from 13 September – 19 October 1437. After a few failed assaults on the city, the Portuguese force defeated by a Moroccan relief army led by vizier Abu Zakariya Yahya al-Wattasi of Fez. The Moroccans encircled the Portuguese camp and starved it to submission, capturing Ferdinand. To preserve his army from destruction, Henry negotiated a treaty promising to return the citadel of Ceuta to Morocco in return for being allowed to withdraw his troops.

The debacle at Tangier dominated the final year of Edward's life. His younger sons Peter of Coimbra and constable John of Portugal urged him to fulfill the treaty, yield Ceuta and secure Ferdinand's release, whereas Henry (who had signed the treaty) urged him to renege on it. Caught in indecision, Edward assembled the Portuguese Cortes in early 1438 for consultation. The Cortes refused to ratify the treaty, preferring to hang on to Ceuta and requesting that Edward find some other means of obtaining Ferdinand's release. Edward died late that summer of the plague, like his father and mother before him. Despite the Castro Mission of 1440–1441, Ferdinand would remain in captivity in Fez until his own death in 1443.

The death of Ferdinand sealed Portugal's hold on the city. A high price had been paid for it, and the question of abandoning Ceuta was shelved permanently. It gave an impetus to new Portuguese expansionism in Morocco, now tinged with an element of revenge. The memory of the Saint Prince was cited by Afonso V of Portugal in launching the 1458 expedition to seize Tangier – although it was deviated, and ended up seizing Ksar es-Seghir instead. A third attempt to take Tangier was launched in late 1463, which also failed. On the fourth attempt, Tangier fell to the Portuguese in August 1471.

=== Later expeditions ===
In 1455, Calixtus III issued a call to a crusade. When it was delivered to Afonso V, he pledged to assemble an army to confront the Muslims. Upon sending envoys to Naples and other European courts, Afonso found that only he had heeded the call among all European monarchs. After Calixtus died on 6 August 1458, Afonso decided to attack Tangier in Morocco instead, but was persuaded to instead divert his forces to capture Ksar es-Seghir. Ksar es-Seguir at the time served as a Muslim pirate haven for the Marinid sultan, then at war with Portugal. The subsequent Portuguese conquest of Ksar es-Seghir took place from 16 to 18 October 1458. Abd al-Haqq II decided to keep his army in Tangier upon being informed of the presence of the Portuguese fleet, while he was preparing an attack on Tlemcen. He was subsequently murdered in the 1465 Moroccan revolution.

The Anfa expedition of 1468 took place when a Portuguese fleet commanded by Fernando of Viseu razed the town of Anfa, then one of the most important cities in Morocco and a pirate haven. This was followed by the Conquest of Asilah on 24 August 1471. The victory at Asilah paved the way for the unopposed conquest of Tangier four days later on 28 August 1471. In August 1487, the Chaouia Expedition was successful in taking the Moroccan city of Chaouia, followed by the taking of a pirate haven in the Targa Expedition of 1490.

The Graciosa Fortress was established on the coast of Morocco in 1489. Altogether, the Portuguese seized six Moroccan cities and built six stand-alone fortresses on the Moroccan Atlantic coast, between the Loukkos River in the north and the Sous River in the south. The Portuguese would abandon most of their settlements in the 16th century, but were able to keep their bases at Ceuta and Tangier.

== Ottoman–Venetian wars, 1416–1430 ==
The Ottoman-Venetian Wars began with Venice's participation in the Crusade of Nicopolis in 1396 and continued for many centuries After winning the Interregnum, Mehmed I conquered significant lands from the Mamluks. The Republic of Venice, as the premier maritime and commercial power in the area, endeavoured to renew the treaties it had concluded with Mehmed's predecessors during the civil war. The Venetian bailo in Constantinople was instructed in May 1414 to do just that but failed. Tensions between the two powers mounted, as the Ottomans moved to re-establish a sizeable navy and launched several raids that challenged Venetian naval hegemony in the Aegean Sea.

=== Battle of Gallipoli ===
The Battle of Gallipoli occurred on 29 May 1416 between the Venetian and Ottoman fleets off the Ottoman naval base of Gallipoli. The battle was the main episode of a brief conflict between the two powers, resulting from Ottoman attacks against possessions and shipping of the Venetians and their allies in the Aegean Sea in 1414–1415. The Venetian fleet, under Pietro Loredan, was charged with transporting Venetian envoys to the Ottoman sultan, but was authorized to attack if the Ottomans refused to negotiate.

The Ottomans exchanged fire with the Venetian ships as soon as the Venetian fleet approached Gallipoli on 27 May, forcing the Venetians to withdraw. On the next day, the two fleets manoeuvred and fought off Gallipoli, but during the evening, Loredan managed to contact the Ottoman authorities and inform them of his diplomatic mission. Despite assurances that the Ottomans would welcome the envoys, when the Venetian fleet approached the city, the Ottoman fleet sailed to meet the Venetians and the two sides quickly became embroiled in battle. The Venetians scored a crushing victory, killing the Ottoman admiral, capturing a large part of the Ottoman fleet, and taking large numbers of Ottoman crews prisoner. Many of the prisoner—particularly the Christians serving voluntarily in the Ottoman fleet—were executed. The Venetians then retired to Tenedos to replenish their supplies and rest. Although a crushing Venetian victory, which confirmed Venetian naval superiority in the Aegean Sea for the next few decades, the battle had little impact. A peace agreement was brokered but refused by the Venetian Senate, and a settlement of the conflict was delayed until the Ottoman–Venetian peace treaty was signed in 1419.

=== Siege of Constantinople ===
Upon the death of his father Mehmed I in 1421, Murad II was recognized as sultan of the Ottomans at sixteen years of age. Murad's reign was troubled by insurrection early on when Manuel II Palaiologos released Mustafa Çelebi, son of Bayezid I, from prison and declared him as the legitimate sultan. Mustafa raised an army and, with the help of the Byzantines, captured Gelibolu and Edirne. Eventually, Mustafa was defeated by Murad II and put to death. The sultan then turned his arms against Manuel II and declared his resolution to punish him by the capture of Constantinople and Thessalonica.

The first full-scale Ottoman Siege of Constantinople took place in 1422 as a result of the Byzantine Emperor Manuel II's attempts to interfere in the succession of Ottoman sultans. This policy of the Byzantines was often used successfully in weakening their neighbours. When Murad II emerged as the winning successor to his father, he marched into Byzantine territory.

On 10 June 1422, Ottoman warlord Mihaloğlu attacked Constantinople, thus beginning the siege of the city. The vanguard under Mihaloğlu ravaged the city's suburbs, before Murad himself arrived on 20 June with the main army and the siege engines, and the siege began in earnest.

Murad was forced to lift the siege in September due to the rebellion of his younger brother Küçük Mustafa in Anatolia. This was supported by the Anatolian beyliks of Germiyan and Karaman, fearing a return of Ottoman power, and financed by the Byzantine emperor. Küçük was able to gather a large army, and in early September laid siege to the Ottoman capital Bursa.

In spite of the Byzantine victory, the empire at this time had been reduced to a few disconnected strips of land besides the city of Constantinople itself. It was also facing grave economic problems and severely lacked soldiers. Pius II promoted the donation of cannons by European monarchs as a means of aid. Aside from these gifts, no other advances were made to the Byzantine arsenal.

=== Siege of Thessalonica ===
Thessalonica was under Ottoman control from 1387 to 1403 before returning to Byzantine rule in the aftermath of the Battle of Ankara. In 1422, after the Byzantines supported Mustafa Çelebi, Murad II attacked the city, beginning the Siege of Thessalonica. Unable to provide manpower or resources for the city's defense, governor Andronikos Palaiologos handed it over to Venice in September 1423. The Venetians attempted to persuade the sultan to recognize their possession, but failed as Murad considered the city his by right and the Venetians to be interlopers. This impasse led to an Ottoman blockade of Thessalonica, which occasionally flared up with direct attacks on the city. At the same time, the conflict was mostly fought as a series of raids by both sides against the other's territories in the Balkans and the Aegean Islands. The Venetians repeatedly tried to apply pressure by blocking the passage of the Dardanelles at Gallipoli, with little success.

Venetian nobleman Alvise Loredan led naval operations in defense of Thessalonica and in July 1425, raided the fortress at Ierissos and other forts in its vicinity, and then onto Christopolis. The Venetians found the castle held by a force of Ottoman sipahis. Their first attack was repulsed but Ottoman resistance was eventually overcome. The Venetians occupied the fortress, but their success was temporary, as the Turks soon returned with a larger force and stormed the castle, killing or taking prisoner its garrison.

The city's metropolitan bishop Symeon of Thessalonica encouraged the citizens to resist. By 1426, with Venice unable to secure peace, the local population preferred a surrender to avoid the pillage that would accompany a forcible conquest. Venice's efforts to find allies against the Ottomans also failed. The other regional potentates either pursued their own course, were themselves antagonistic to the Venetians, or were defeated by the Ottomans.

After years of inconclusive exchanges, the two sides prepared for a final confrontation in 1429. In March, Venice formally declared war on the Ottomans, but even then the conservative mercantile aristocracy running the republic were uninterested in raising an army sufficient to protect Thessalonica, let alone to force the sultan to seek terms. In early 1430, Murad was able to concentrate his forces against Thessalonica, taking it by storm on 29 March 1430. The privations of the siege and the subsequent sack decimated the city, from as many as 40,000 inhabitants to as few as 2,000, requiring large-scale resettlement in the following years. Venice concluded a peace treaty with the sultan in July, recognising the new status quo. Over the next few decades, the antagonism between Venice and the Ottomans grew into a rivalry over control of Albania.

== Hussite Crusades ==
The Hussite Crusades were a series of civil wars fought between the Hussites and the combined Catholic forces of Sigismund, now Holy Roman Empire, the papacy and European monarchs. These wars lasted from 1419 to approximately 1434.

By 1415, Bohemia was in turmoil and the subject of much discussion at the Council of Constance. Adherents of Jan Hus, who had been burned at the stake, were declared heretics by the Council who insisted the civil and ecclesiastical authorities in Bohemia deal with the heresy. In 1419, Wenceslaus IV, who had resisted what he considered interference in his kingdom, commanded that all ejected Catholic beneficiaries should be reinstated in their offices and revenues. Prague prepared for armed resistance. Jan Želivský, an anti-Catholic preacher of Prague, led a procession to the town hall/ Under the leadership of Jan Žižka, a veteran of the Battle of Grunwald, the building was stormed and people found inside were thrown out of the windows on to the spears and swords of the processionists, and hacked to pieces. In Kutná Hora, hundreds of captured Hussites were thrown into the shafts of silver mines. Wenceslaus swore death to all the rebels, but died of a stroke on 16 August 1419. The next months were marked by deeds of violence. Many citizens, especially Germans, had to flee. Significantly outnumbered Hussite militia led by Žižka repulsed surprise assaults by heavy cavalry during Battle of Nekmíř in December 1419 and Battle of Sudoměř in March 1420.

=== First Hussite Crusade ===
After the death of Wenceslaus, his brother Sigismund inherited a claim on the Bohemian crown. Sigismund was aided by Martin V, who issued a bull on 17 March 1420 proclaiming a crusade against the Wycliffites, Hussites and all other heretics in Bohemia. Sigismund and many German princes arrived at Prague on 30 June 1420 at the head of an army of crusaders from all parts of Europe, largely consisting of adventurers attracted by the hope of pillage. They immediately began a siege of the city, which soon to be abandoned. Negotiations took place for a settlement of the religious differences.

The Hussites formulated their demands in a statement known as the Four Articles of Prague. These articles, which contain the essence of the Hussite doctrine, were rejected by Sigismund, reflecting the influence of the papal legates who considered them prejudicial to the authority of the pope. Hostilities continued and Sigismund was defeated at the Battle of Vítkov Hill on 14 July 1420.

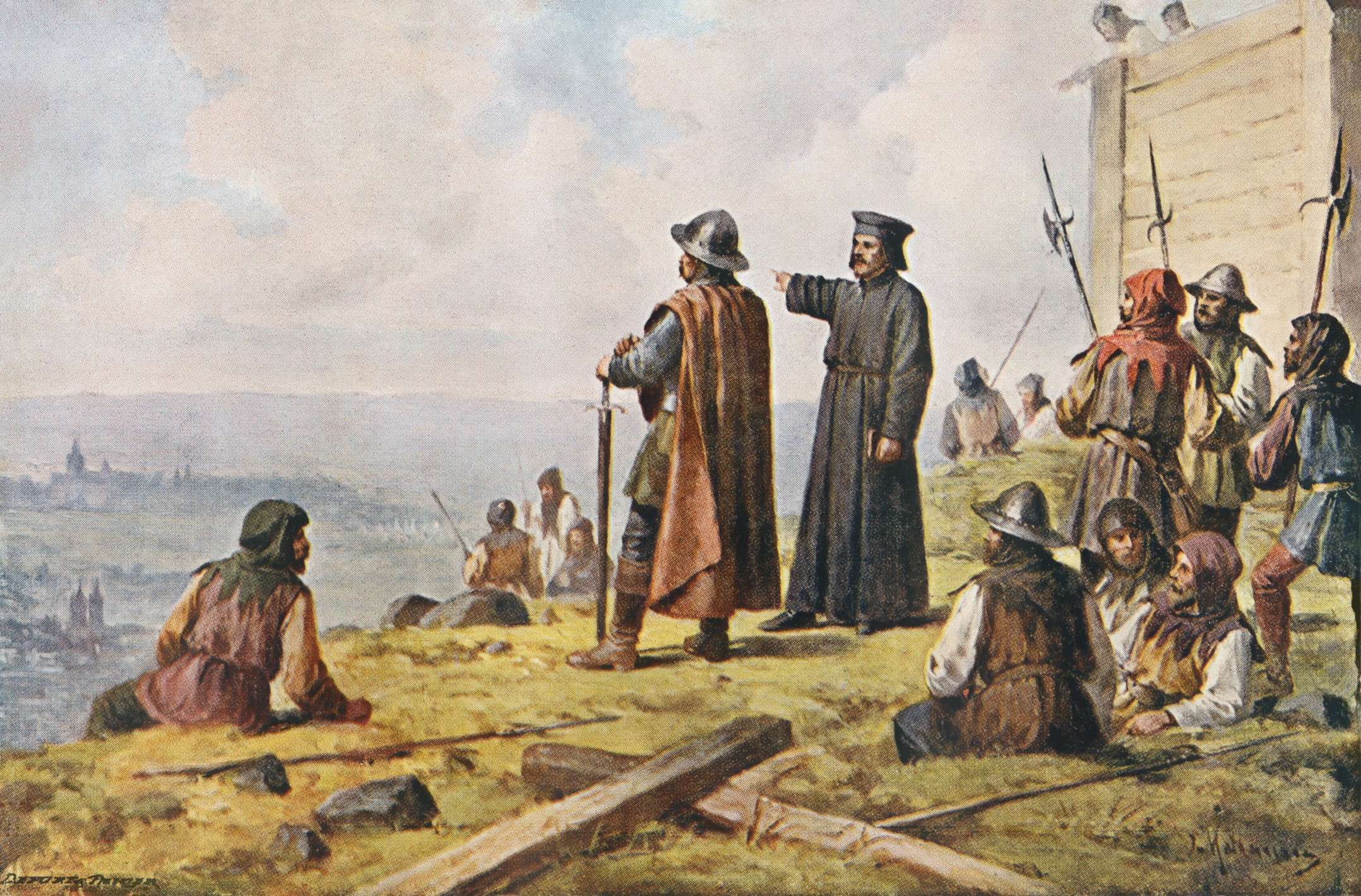
Jan Žižka with a Hussite priest looking over Prague after the Battle of Vítkov Hill

Though Sigismund had retired from Prague, his troops held the castles of Vyšehrad and Hradčany. Beginning on 16 August 1420, the citizens of Prague laid siege at the Battle of Vyšehrad, and by October, the defending garrison was on the point of capitulating through famine. Sigismund tried to relieve the fortress but was decisively defeated by the Hussites on 1 November 1420 near the village of Pankrác. The castles of Vyšehrad and Hradčany now capitulated, and shortly afterwards almost all Bohemia fell into the hands of the Hussites.

=== Second Hussite Crusade ===
Internal troubles prevented the Hussites from fully capitalizing on their victory. In Prague, Jan Želivský obtained almost unlimited authority over the lower classes of the townsmen. At Tábor, a religious egalitarian movement of Adamites was suppressed by Žižka. The Battle of Tábor took place on 30 June 1420. Taking advantage of their weakened state, Oldřich II of Rosenberg laid siege to the village. He commanded a force that included Austrian mercenaries led by Lipolt Krajíř. Learning of the siege, Mikuláš of Hus attacked Tábor on 30 June 1420. Oldřich II was caught off-guard by the attack and his forces scattered, suffering heavy losses in their retreat. The Hussite victory lifted a week-long siege, while Oldřich II missed the opportunity to eliminate the base of radical Hussites near his estates.

Shortly afterwards a new crusade against the Hussites was undertaken. A large German army entered Bohemia and in August 1421 laid siege to the town of Žatec. After an unsuccessful attempt of storming the city, the crusaders retreated on hearing that the Hussite troops were approaching. Sigismund arrived in Bohemia at the end of 1421. The Battle of Kutná Hora on 21 December 1421 left him in possession of the city, but was decisively defeated by Jan Žižka at the Battle of Německý Brod on 6 January 1422.

=== Third Hussite Crusade ===
On 9 March 1422, Jan Želivský was arrested by the town council of Prague and beheaded. There were also troubles at Tábor where a more radical party opposed Žižka's authority. Civil war broke out between the extremist Taborites and the more moderate Utraquists. Papal influence had succeeded in calling forth a new crusade against Bohemia, but it was a complete failure. In spite of their rulers, Poles and Lithuanians did not wish to attack the kindred Czechs. The Germans were prevented by internal discord from taking joint action against the Hussites. Eric VII of Denmark, who had landed in Germany with a large force intending to take part in the crusade, soon returned to his own country. Free for a time from foreign threat, the Hussites invaded Moravia, where a large part of the population favored their creed. Paralysed again by dissensions, they soon returned to Bohemia.

In 1422, Žižka accepted Sigismund Korybut of Lithuania as regent of Bohemia. The city of Hradec Králové, which had been under Utraquist rule, espoused the doctrine of Tábor, and called Žižka to its aid. The Battle of Hořice was among several military successes gained by Žižka in 1423 and the following year, a peace treaty between the Hussite factions was concluded on 13 September 1424 at Libeň, a village near Prague. After Žižka's death in October 1424, Prokop the Great took command of the Taborites.

=== Fourth Hussite Crusade ===
In June 1426, Hussite forces led by Prokop and Sigismund Korybut defeated the invaders in the Battle of Aussig. Despite this result, the death of Jan Žižka caused Martin V to believe that the Hussites were much weakened. Martin proclaimed yet another crusade in 1427. He appointed Cardinal Henry Beaufort of England, papal legate of Germany, Hungary and Bohemia, to lead the crusader forces. The crusaders were defeated at the Battle of Tachov.

The Hussites invaded parts of Germany several times, but they made no attempt to occupy any part of the country. Korybut was imprisoned in 1427 for allegedly conspiring to surrender the Hussite forces to Hungary. He was released in 1428, and participated in the Hussite invasion of Silesia. In 1430, Joan of Arc dictated a letter threatening to lead a crusading army against the Hussites unless they returned to the Catholic Faith.

=== Fifth Hussite Crusade ===
On 1 August 1431, a large army of crusaders under Frederick I of Brandenburg, accompanied by Cardinal Julian Cesarini as papal legate, crossed the Bohemian border. On 8 August, the crusaders reached the town of Domažlice and began besieging it. A Hussite relief army arrived shortly thereafter, reinforced with some 6,000 Polish Hussites and under the command of Prokop the Great. In the Battle of Domažlice on 14 August 1431, the crusaders retreated as a result.

The Utraquists changed sides in 1432 to fight alongside the Catholics and opposed the Taborites and other Hussite spinoffs and in 1434, war again broke out between the Hussite factions. On 30 May 1434, the Taborite army, led by Prokop the Great, who fell in the battle, was defeated and almost annihilated at the Battle of Lipany. The Polish Hussite movement also came to an end. Polish royal troops under Władysław III of Poland defeated the Hussites at the Battle of Grotniki on 4 May 1439, bringing the Hussite Wars to an end.

== Mamluk conquest of Cyprus ==
Janus of Cyprus became king of Cyprus on 9 September 1398 following the death of his father James I of Cyprus. By tradition, he was also titular king of Jerusalem and Armenian Cilicia. Both mainland kingdoms were under Mamluk control and the sultan Barsbay soon would set his sights on Cyprus. Cyprus had become a base for Frankish pirates and raiders and in 1365, the Alexandrian Crusade was launched. The city was sacked, its inhabitants killed and treasures looted. In August 1422, the Cypriots captured a ship in the port of Alexandria and in May 1424, they seized two ships from Damietta. These raids prompted the Mamluk sultan Barsbay to send naval expeditions to Cyprus, beginning the Mamluk campaigns against Cyprus.

In late September 1424, a Mamluk armada landed near Limassol, and the city was evacuated. The Mamluks attacked the city, sacking and burning it. In July 1425, the next raid arrived south of Famagusta where the governor pledged allegiance to the sultan and showed hospitality. The Mamluks aimed to subjugate the entire island, and again attacked Limassol on 1 July 1426, destroying the castle. The Mamluks met Janus' army at the Battle of Khirokitia on 7 July 1426 where the Cypriot army was routed and Janus was captured in battle. They marched to capture Nicosia, sacking a side of the city, on 18 July 1426, embarked for home. Humiliated, Janus was brought to the sultan and was forced to pay a large ransom and agree to an annual tribute. Cyprus thus became a Mamluk tributary state.

== Polish–Teutonic War ==
The Polish–Teutonic War was an armed conflict between the Kingdom of Poland and the Teutonic Knights from 1431 to 1435. The war broke out after Teutonic Grand Master Paul of Rusdorf signed the Treaty of Christmemel on 19 June 1431, creating an alliance with Lithuanian Grand Duke Švitrigaila, who was engaged in the Lithuanian Civil War with his brother Władysław II Jagiełło.

In 1431, while the main Polish forces were involved in Lutsk in Volhynia, the Teutonic Knights invaded Poland. Finding little opposition, the Knights ravaged Dobrzyń Land and tried to move on to the Kuyavia and Krajna regions. However, their army was defeated by the Poles on 13 September 1431 near Nakel. In September, a two-year truce was signed among Poland, Lithuania and the Teutons.

In June 1433, Poland allied itself with Czech Hussites in order to stop the Teutonic Knights from sending secret support to Švitrigaila via its autonomous branch, the Livonian Order. Czech forces under Jan Čapek were granted safe passage through Poland. The Polish forces were also supported by Bogusław IX of Pomerania. In addition, Stephen II of Moldavia joined the Polish alliance. For four months, the Hussite army, including forces led by Feodor Ostrogski, ravaged Teutonic territories in Neumark, Pomerania, and western Prussia. They unsuccessfully besieged Chojnice, then moved north to Świecie and Gdańsk. They captured several towns and castles, including Tczew by August 1433.

When Władysław II died in May 1434, the Order resumed its backing for Švitrigaila, who rallied his supporters, including his nephew Sigismund Korybut, a distinguished military commander of the Hussites. The decisive Battle of Wiłkomierz was fought in September 1435 near Ukmergė. It is estimated to have involved 30,000 men on both sides. Švitrigaila's army, led by Sigismund Korybut, was split by the attacking Lithuanian–Polish army, led by Michael Žygimantaitis, and soundly defeated. The Livonian Order suffered a great defeat, sometimes compared to that which had been inflicted on the Teutons at Grunwald in 1410. The war ended with the signing of the Peace of Brześć Kujawski on 31 December 1435.

== Crusade of Varna ==
The Crusade of Varna, part of the long-running Ottoman-Hungarian wars, was an unsuccessful military campaign mounted by several European leaders to check the expansion of the Ottomans the Balkans between 1443 and 1444. The Ottoman victory in Varna, followed by their victory in the Second Battle of Kosovo in 1448, deterred the European states from sending substantial military assistance to the Byzantines during the Ottoman Conquest of Constantinople in 1453. Although Pius II officially declared a three-year crusade at the Council of Mantua to recapture Constantinople from the Ottomans, the leaders who promised 80,000 soldiers to it reneged on their commitment. The Ottoman Empire was free, for several decades, from any further serious attempts to push it out of Europe.

=== Background ===
In 1439, the Ottoman army headed by Murad II again attacked and sacked Serbia. Đurađ Branković fled to Hungary in May 1439, leaving his son Grgur Branković and Thomas Kantakouzenos to defend Smederevo. After three months of siege, Smederevo fell on 18 August 1439, while the Siege of Novo Brdo continued for two years, with the city falling on 27 June 1441. In 1440, Murad began the Siege of Belgrade, lasting from April–October 1440. After failing to take the fortress, he was forced to return to Anatolia to stop attacks by the Karamanids. At that point the only free part of Serbia that remained was Zeta which was soon attacked by the Venetians and by Stjepan Vukčić Kosača. The last of Đurađ's cities in the region were conquered in March 1442.

=== Early engagements ===
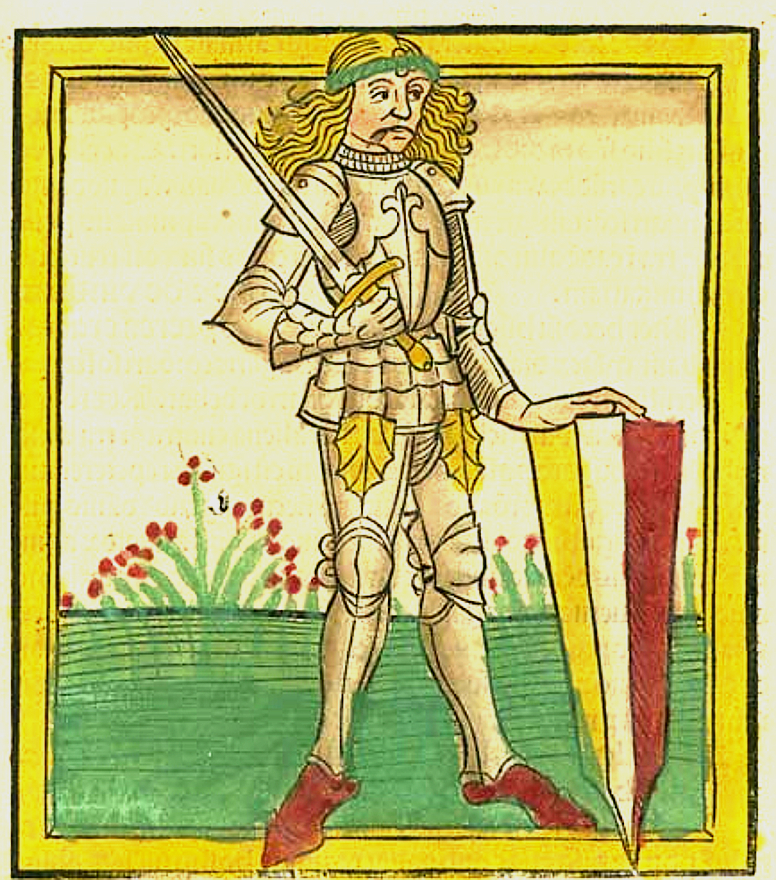
John Hunyadi

On 1 January 1443, Eugene IV published a bull calling for a new crusade. War was proclaimed against Murad II at the diet of Buda on Palm Sunday 1443. For the first time since the disastrous Crusade of Nikopolis of 1396, Hungary had initiated an ambitious offensive campaign against the Ottoman Empire, encouraged by Eugene IV and his legate Cardinal Giuliano Cesarini. A Hungarian army of some 35,000 troops was led by John Hunyadi. This army was accompanied by Cesarini, Grgur Branković, and Władysław III of Poland, who had been elected as king of Hungary in expectation of significant Polish support against the Turks. The army left Buda on 22 July 1443, crossed the Serbian border by mid-October, and occupied Sofia shortly thereafter.

The first encounter at the Battle of Niš in November 1443 was a victory for the crusaders. This was followed by their defeat by the Ottomans led by Kasim Pasha at the Battle of Zlatitsa on 12 December 1443. As they marched home, they ambushed and defeated a pursuing force in the Battle of Kunovica on 5 January 1444, where Mahmud Bey was taken prisoner. Ottoman commander Turahan Bey defeated the troops that surrounded the city in early 1433. Having gained some other minor victories, the crusader army returned home in January after learning that Murad II had crossed the Bosporus, and celebrated a spectacular triumphal march in Buda.

=== Battle of Varna ===
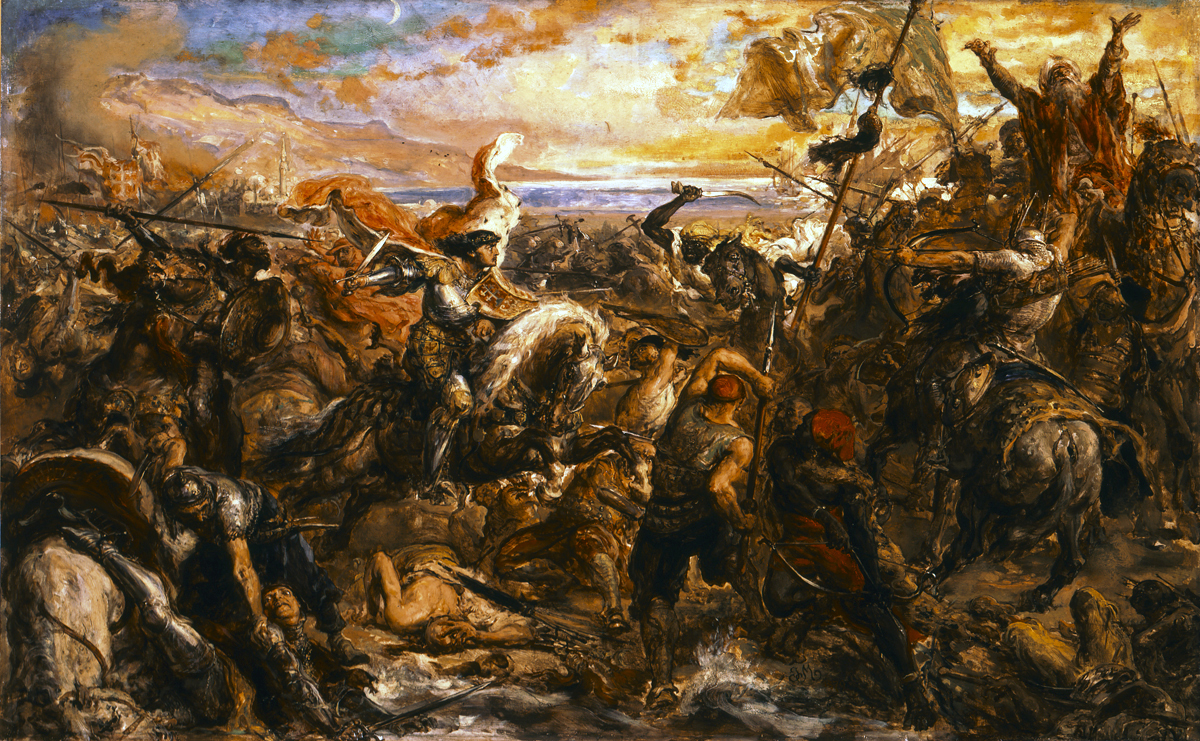
Władysław III of Poland in the Battle of Varna, by Jan Matejko

Despite the signing of the Treaty of Szeged on 14 August 1444, the conflict did not end. Shortly after all the short-term requirements of the treaty were fulfilled, the Hungarians and their allies resumed the crusade. Władysław gathered an army composed mostly of Hungarian regular troops, and forces from Poland, Transylvania, Croatia, Bosnia, heavy cavalry units from Western Europe, and mercenaries from Eastern Europe. The combined armies numbered 16,000, and were joined by 4,000 Wallachians in the area of Nicopolis. Murad, who had retired shortly after the treaty was completed, was called back to lead the Ottoman army. On 10 November 1444, the two armies clashed at the Battle of Varna. The Ottomans won a decisive victory despite heavy losses, while the crusaders lost Władysław III and over 15,000 men.

=== Aftermath ===
The death of Władysław left Hungary in the hands of the four-year-old Ladislaus the Posthumous. He was succeeded in Poland by Casimir IV Jagiellon after a three-year interregnum. Murad's casualties at Varna were so heavy, it was not until three days later that he realized he was victorious. Nevertheless, the Ottoman triumph at Varna, followed by their victory in the Second Battle of Kosovo in 1448, deterred the European states from sending any substantial military assistance to the Byzantines during the Ottoman siege of Constantinople in 1453.

== Sieges of Rhodes ==
After moving from Cyprus in 1310, Hospitaller Rhodes served as the headquarters of the Knights Hospitaller. They then moved their convent and hospital, and resettled the island. Their hold on the island was solidified through the enforcement of a papal ban on trade between Christian states and Mamluk Egypt. The Hospitallers scored victories against their Muslim rivals at Amorgos and Chios in 1312 and 1319, respectively. In 1320, the Order's navy thwarted a Turkish invasion of the island by halting the advance of a large Turkish fleet.

A 1450 map of the eastern Mediterranean

=== First Siege of Rhodes ===
Mamluk sultan Sayf ad-Din Jaqmaq, in power since 1438, had to deal with piracy from both Cyprus and Rhodes. In 1439, he launched a campaign against the two islands but without much success. A second failure in 1442 led him to build a fleet capable of leading a real assault against Rhodes.

In the winter of 1443, Grand Master Jean de Lastic sent a letter to Alfonso V of Aragon lamenting the hardships faced by the Order and requesting that its members residing on his possessions return to Rhodes to protect it. Alfonso acted as a patron of the Order, closely collaborating with the two previous masters who were both of Catalan origin. Philip the Good and Eugene IV were among those who provided the Hospitallers with auxiliary ships and supplies. In the interim, a Mamluk fleet had already set sail towards the same destination.

The first Siege of Rhodes was about to begin. In August 1444, a Mamluk force landed on the Hospitaller island of Kastellorizo, razing its castle before departing for Rhodes. On 10 August, the Mamluk fleet consisting of 85 ships appeared in the channel east of Rhodes. Their objective was the castle near Trianta and, facing no resistance after landing, they captured positions adjacent to the associated citadel. The following day, they the western side of the castle, near the poorly defended gate of Agios Antonios, bombarding it with artillery. A second column raided the port to the east of the castle, destroying numerous ships. On 10 September, the Hospitallers attacked am outpost southwest of the Agios Antonios gate. Heavy fighting ensued and the Mamluks eventually withdrew. On 13 September, the Mamluks lifted the siege against the orders of Jaqmaq. Jean de Lastic proposed conducting an assault on the invaders to disrupt their withdrawal, but his plan was rejected by his military council. On 18 September 1444, the Mamluks departed Rhodes.

=== Second Siege of Rhodes ===
The second Siege of Rhodes was conducted in 1480. Pierre d'Aubusson was Grand Master at that time and a zealous enemy of the Ottoman Empire. In May 1480, Mehmed II dispatched a large fleet to Rhodes, carrying an invading army of some 100,000 men under the command of Mesih Pasha. By August, after three unsuccessful attempts against the city, the Turkish force withdrew, leaving behind 9000 dead. The siege, in which d'Aubusson was wounded three times, enhanced his reputation throughout Europe.

Gulielmus Caoursin, vice-chancellor of the Knights Hospitaller, was an eyewitness of the siege and wrote its description in his Obsidionis Rhodiae Urbis Descriptio (with an English translation published Edward Gibbon's Crusades). An earlier English translation was the work of John Caius the Elder. D'Aubusson's own report on the siege can be found in John Taaffe's History of the Holy, Military, Sovereign Order of St. John of Jerusalem.

=== Cem Sultan ===
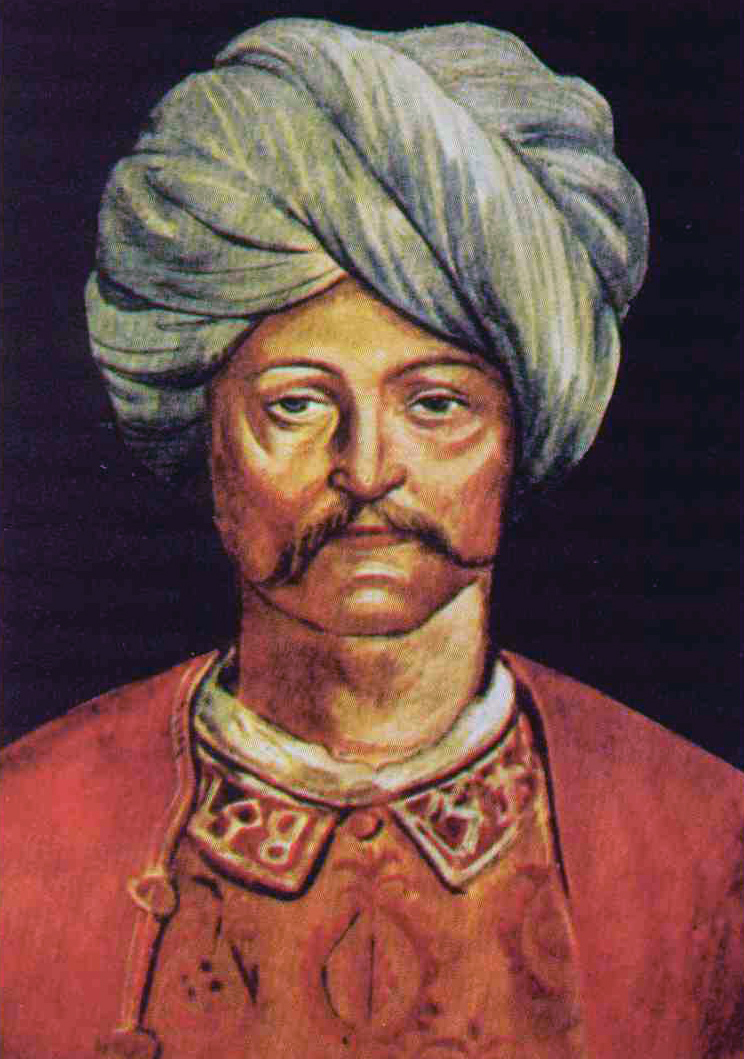
Cem Sultan by Pinturicchio

Mehmed was furious at the retreat from Rhodes and died before he could attach the island again. After his death in 1481, his succession was disputed between his sons Bayezid II and Cem Sultan. A battle between the two contenders to the Ottoman throne took place on 19 June 1481, near the town of Yenişehir. Cem lost and fled with his family to Cairo.

Cem was received with honors by sultan Quitbay in Cairo, and he took the opportunity to go on pilgrimage to Mecca, making him the only Ottoman prince to have made such a journey. In Cairo, Cem received a letter from his brother, offering one million akçes for him to stop competing for the throne. Cem rejected the offer and in the following year he launched a campaign in Anatolia with the support of Kasım Bey, ruler of the Karamanids, and the sanjek bey of Ankara. On 27 May 1482, Cem besieged Konya but was soon defeated and forced to withdraw to Ankara. He intended to give it all up and return to Cairo but the roads to Egypt were under Bayezid's control. Cem then tried to renegotiate with his brother. Bayezid offered him a stipend to live quietly in Jerusalem but refused to divide the empire, prompting Cem to flee to Rhodes on 29 July 1482.

Upon arriving at Rhodes, Cem received the protection of Pierre d'Aubusson. In return for the overthrow of Bayezid, Cem offered peace with the Ottoman Empire if he regained the throne. D'Aubusson realized that conflict with Bayezid would be imprudent, so he secretly approached Bayezid, concluded a peace treaty, and then reached a separate agreement on Cem's captivity in March 1483. D'Aubusson promised Bayezid to detain Cem in return for an annual payment of 40,000 ducats for his maintenance.

Cem was then sent to France, arriving in Nice on 17 October 1482. After the agreement about his confinement was finalised, he became a hostage, as well as a potential pawn. Those who hoped to use his name and person to foment turmoil in the Ottoman realm included Quitbay, Matthias Corvinus, and Innocent VIII, viewing his presence in Europe as a deterrent to Ottoman aggression and an opportunity for profit. For his part, Bayezid dispatched ambassadors and spies to the West to assure that his rival was detained indefinitely, and even attempted to assassinate him.

In 1483, the Hospitallers transferred him to Limousin, d'Aubusson's birthplace, where he was held as a captive in a fortified tower constructed to house him. Innocent VIII then sought custody of the prince, and Cem arrived in Rome on 13 March 1489. The pope rebuffed overtures from the Mamluks and prepared to launch a crusade against the Ottomans. These developments worried Bayezid, who contacted d'Aubusson and also sent an embassy to Rome to negotiate an agreement in December 1490. The sultan promised not to attack Rhodes, Rome, or Venice, as well as to pay Cem's allowance. Cem died in Capua while on a military expedition to conquer Naples.

== Ottoman conquests of Mehmed II ==
When Ottoman sultan Mehmed II ascended the throne again in 1451, he earned the nickname Mehmed the Conqueror. He viewed the Ottoman state as a continuation of the Roman Empire for the remainder of his life, seeing himself as continuing the empire rather than replacing it. Under his leadership, the Ottoman Empire experienced dramatic territorial growth, beginning with the conquest of Constantinople in 1453. Mehmed II went on to consolidate the empire's position in the Balkans and Anatolia, conquering Serbia in 1454–1455, the Peloponnese in 1458–1459, Trebizond in 1461, and Bosnia in 1463. Many Venetian territories in Greece were conquered during the Ottoman-Venetian War of 1463–1479. By 1474 the Ottomans had conquered their Anatolian rival, the Karamanids, and in 1475 conquered Kefe on the Crimean Peninsula, establishing the Crimean Khanate as a vassal state. In 1480 an invasion of Otranto in Italy was launched, but the death of Mehmed II the following year led to an Ottoman withdrawal.

Campaigns of Mehmed II
Campaign	Campaign dates	Notes
Karaman	1451	The Karamanids attacked Ottoman territory after Mehmed became sultan. In response sultan Mehmed made his first campaign against Karaman. The Karamanids were defeated and İbrahim II of Karaman promised not to attack the Ottomans again and so peace was restored.
Constantinople	1453	While sultan Mehmed was on his campaign against Karaman, the Byzantine emperor Constantine XI demanded an increase of the annual allowance to an Ottoman pretender in Constantinople. Mehmed refused and prepared to besiege Constantinople. He ordered the construction of the Rumeli Hisar after which the siege of the city began. The Fall of Constantinople followed a siege lasting 53 days. The Byzantine Empire ceased to exist and the city became the new capital of the Ottoman Empire.
Kingdom of Hungary, Kingdom of Serbia	1454-55	Mehmed led a campaign against Serbia because the Serbian ruler Đurađ Branković refused to send tribute and made an alliance with the Kingdom of Hungary. The Ottoman army conquered the important mining city of Novo Brdo.
Kingdom of Hungary	1456	Mehmed continued his campaign against Hungary, numerous castles were captured but the Siege of Belgrade (1456) was unsuccessful and the Ottoman army retreated.
Serbia	1458-59	After the death of the Serbian ruler Đurađ Branković a succession war broke out and the sultan who was related to the Serbian kings invaded the area, Smederevo was captured and the Serbian Despotate ended and was annexed to the Ottoman Empire. (See History of the Serbian–Turkish wars)
Morea	1458-59	The Despotate of Morea refused to pay its annual tribute and revolted. In response Mehmed led a campaign into Morea. The inhabitants were defeated and their territories were annexed into the Ottoman Empire.
Amasra	1460	Amasra, the most important fortress of the Genoese on the Black Sea coast, was besieged and captured.
Sinop	1461	Mehmed led a campaign against Trebizond and on the way annexed the entire Black Sea coast to the Ottoman Empire ending the reign of the Jandarids peacefully.
Trebizond	1461	After the emperor of the Empire of Trebizond refused to pay tribute and made an alliance with the Akkoyunlu Mehmed led a campaign against Trebizond by land and sea. After a siege of more than 32 days, Trebizond and the emperor surrendered and the Empire came to an end.
Wallachia	1462	Vlad the Impaler who with Ottoman help had become the Ottoman vassal ruler of Wallachia, refused to pay tribute after some years and invaded Ottoman territory in northern Bulgaria. At that point Mehmed, with the main Ottoman army, was on the Trebizond campaign in Asia. When Mehmed returned from his Trebizond campaign he led a campaign against Wallachia. Vlad fled after some resistance to Hungary. Mehmed first made Wallachia an Ottoman eyalet but then appointed Vlad's brother Radu as a vassal ruler.
Lesbos	1462	The island of Lesbos was captured following a siege of its capital, Mytilene, and annexed.
Bosnia	1463-64	Mehmed led a campaign against the Kingdom of Bosnia and annexed it to the Ottoman Empire
Morea	1463	Mehmed led a campaign in the Morea, which ended with the annexation of the Despotate of Morea.
Albania	1466-1467	Mehmed led a campaign against Albania and conducted the unsuccessful Siege of Krujë against the Albanians under Skanderbeg.
Karaman	1468	After the death of the ruler of Karamanids a civil war began among his sons in which Uzun Hasan, ruler of the Aq Qoyunlu, also became involved. After some time Mehmed marched into the area and annexed the Karamanids to the Ottoman Empire.
Negroponte	1470	During the Ottoman–Venetian War. Mehmed led a campaign against the Venetian colony of Negroponte and after the Siege of Negroponte annexed the region to the Ottoman Empire
Eastern Anatolia	1473	After many years of hostility Mehmed invaded the lands of the Aq Qoyunlu and defeated their ruler, Uzun Hasan, in the Battle of Otlukbeli, after which they did not pose a threat against the Ottomans anymore.
Moldavia	1476	Stephen III of Moldavia attacked Wallachia, an Ottoman vassal, and refused to pay the annual tribute. An Ottoman army was defeated and Mehmed led a personal campaign against Moldavia. He defeated the Moldavians in the Battle of Valea Alba, after that they accepted to pay the tribute and the peace was restored.
Albania	1478	During the Ottoman–Venetian War Mehmed invaded Albania and launched the Siege of Shkodra against the Venetian fortress. The war ended in Venetian defeat and Shkodra was surrendered to the Ottomans in accordance with the Treaty of Constantinople (1479).

=== Fall of Constantinople ===
The Fall of Constantinople occurred when the city was captured on 29 May 1453 as part of the culmination of a 53-day siege. The attacking Ottoman army, which significantly outnumbered Constantinople's defenders, was commanded by the 21-year-old Mehmed II, while the Byzantine army was led by Constantine XI Palaiologos. After conquering the city, Mehmed II made Constantinople the new Ottoman capital, replacing Adrianople. The capture of Constantinople marked the final fall of the Byzantine Empire,

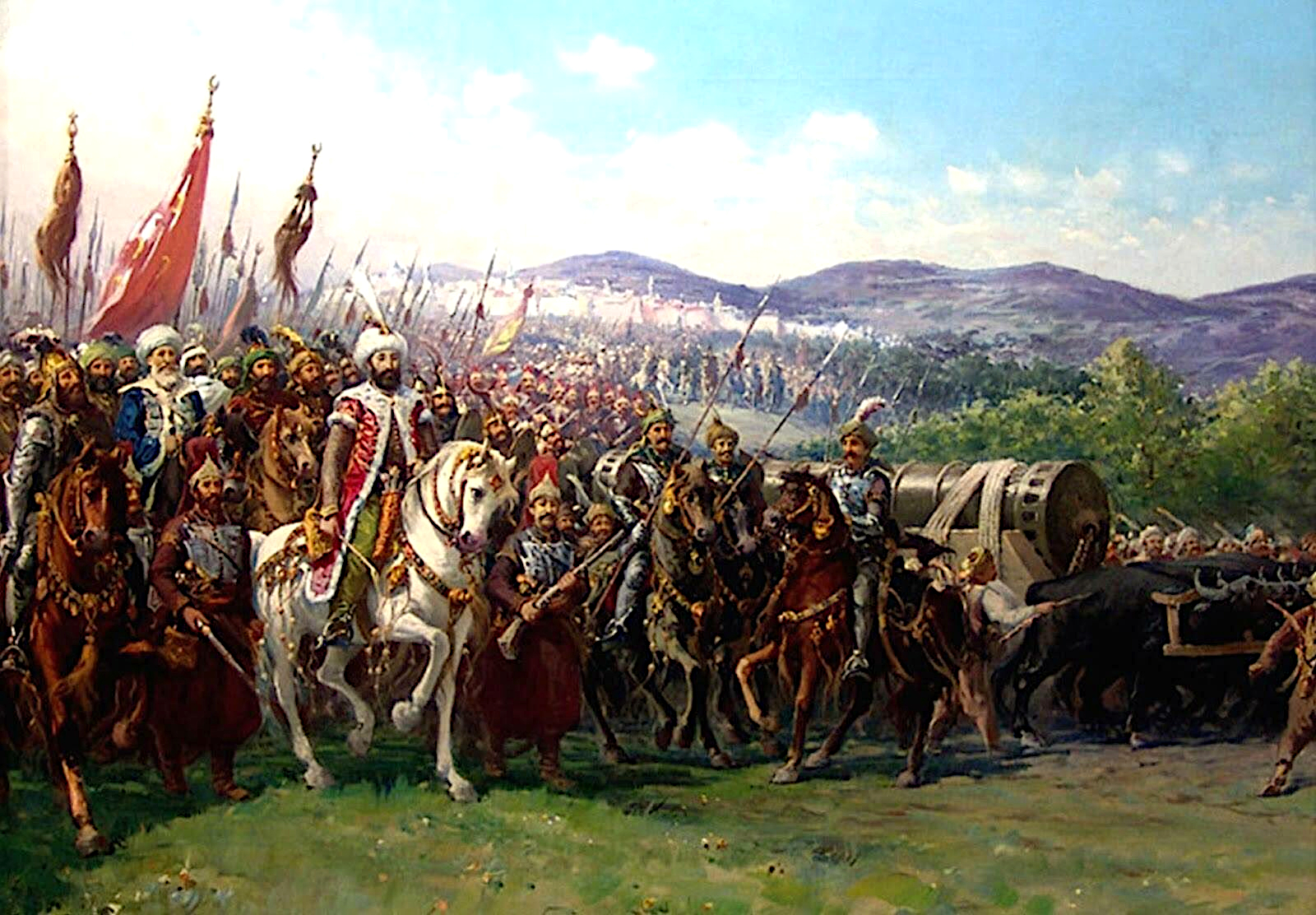
Mehmed II and the Ottoman Army approaching Constantinople, by Fausto Zonaro

Between 1346 and 1349, the Black Death killed almost half of the inhabitants of Constantinople.The city was further depopulated by the general economic and territorial decline of the empire, and by 1453, it consisted of a series of walled villages separated by vast fields encircled by the fifth-century Theodosian Walls.

Preparations for the siege began the construction from March to August 1453 of the massive Boğazkesen Castle on the western shores of the narrowest part of the Bosporus, facing the Güzelce Hisar built by Bayezid I. Mehmet proceeded to isolate the city from possible help by sending Turahan Bey to invade the Morea and dismantling Byzantine fortifications in the Sea of Marmara and on the Black Sea coastline. A Western force of Venetians and Genoese, who had the support of Nicholas V, arrived in Constantinople in early 1453, just before the huge Ottoman forces assembled before its western walls. Some Western individuals, however, came to help defend the city on their own account. Cardinal Isidore, funded by the pope, arrived in 1452 with 200 archers. An accomplished Genoan soldier Giovanni Giustiniani arrived in January 1453 with 700 men.

The siege began on 6 April 1453 with the Ottomans building a floating bridge to the city. The defense of the city made Mehmet oscillate between the advice of his generals, including Karaca Pasha, Zagan Pasha and Ishak Pasha, to proceed tenaciously and the counsel of his grand vizier Çandarlı Halil Pasha to lift the siege. The latter was suspected of consulting with the Byzantines (and was later executed), and so Mehmet carried on with the operations. The Princes' Islands in the Sea of Marmara were taken by Suleiman Baltoghlu's fleet. The end was precipitated following the breaching of a large section of the ramparts and the controversial opening of a small secret underground gate on the northern section of the walls called Kerkoporta through which the Ottomans, who also breached the Charisian Gate further to the north, entered the city. Constantine XI (who had refused to capitulate on Mehmet's terms) was killed along with a handful of defenders near the Gate of St. Romanos on 29 May 1453, ending the siege. Some of the defenders succeeded in fleeing in Venetian and Genoese ships.

Following a period of looting lasting three days, during which Mehmet gave strict orders against the destruction of monuments, he began to colonize his new capital with Muslim populations from his eastern provinces as well as Christians from the recently conquered Greek and Balkan territories. In 1454, Mehmed granted privileges to the Greek Orthodox patriarch Gennadius Scholarius, He was recognized as the Ethnarch of the Orthodox people within the empire.

=== Serbia ===
Mehmed II's first campaigns after Constantinople were in the direction of Serbia, an Ottoman vassal state since the Battle of Kosovo in 1389. Serbian despot Đurađ Branković had recently made an alliance with the Hungarians, and had paid the tribute to the Ottomans irregularly, and so was no in good stead with Mehmed. The Ottoman army set out from Edirne towards Serbia in 1454. Smederevo was besieged, as was Novo Brdo, the most important Serbian metal mining and smelting center. The Ottoman army advanced as far as Belgrade, where it attempted but failed to conquer the city from John Hunyadi at the Siege of Belgrade on 14 July 1456.

The sultan withdrew and Branković regained possession of some parts of Serbia. Later that year Branković died and his succession was in turmoil until the Serbian throne was offered to Stephen Tomašević, the future king of Bosnia, infuriating Mehmed. He sent his army, capturing Smederevo in June 1459, and ending the existence of the Serbian Despotate.

=== The Morea ===
When the Ottomans captured Constantinople in 1453, the Despotate of the Morea failed to send aid, as it was recovering from a recent Ottoman attacks. The unpopular rule by the brothers Demetrios Palaiologos and Thomas Palaiologos resulted in the Morea revolt of 1453–1454, and Ottoman troops under Turahan Bey were invited in to help put down the revolt. By the end of the summer, the Ottomans had achieved the submission of virtually all cities possessed by the Greeks. The last holdout was Salmeniko Castle, under military commander Graitzas Palaiologos. Graitzas and his garrison held out in the castle until July 1461, when they escaped and reached Venetian territory.

Both Demetrios and Thomas Palaiologos went into exile. In March 1461, Thomas arrived in Rome, where he hoped to convince Pius II to call for a crusade. As the brother of the final Byzantine emperor, Thomas was the highest profile ruler in exile. In early 1462, Thomas left to Rome to tour Italy and drum up support for a crusade, carrying with him papal letters of indulgence. Despite Thomas' hopes, no expedition set out for Greece. When the army was ready to set sail, Pius II travelled to Ancona to join the crusade, but died there on 15 August 1464. Without the support of the pope, the crusade disbanded.

The Morea was also the site of the initial phases of the Ottoman-Venetian War, beginning in 1462. The Ottoman conquest of Lesbos began in 1462, culminating in the Siege of Mytilene on 1 September 1462. Most of the campaigns in the Morea were indecisive, with the exception of the Siege of Negroponte beginning on 10 July 1470, resulting in the island of Euboea coming under Ottoman control.

=== Wallachia ===
At the beginning of the 15th century, Wallachia was ruled by a dynasty of voivodes from the House of Basarab. Mircea I of Wallachia began his rule in 1386 and concluded a peace treaty with the Ottomans in 1417, after Mehmed I took control of the ports of Turnu Măgurele and Giurgiu. From 1418 to 1420, Michael I of Wallachia defeated the Ottomans in Severin, only to be killed in battle by their counter-offensive. In 1422, the Ottoman threat was averted when Dan II of Wallachia inflicted a defeat on Murad II, with the help of Pippo Spano.

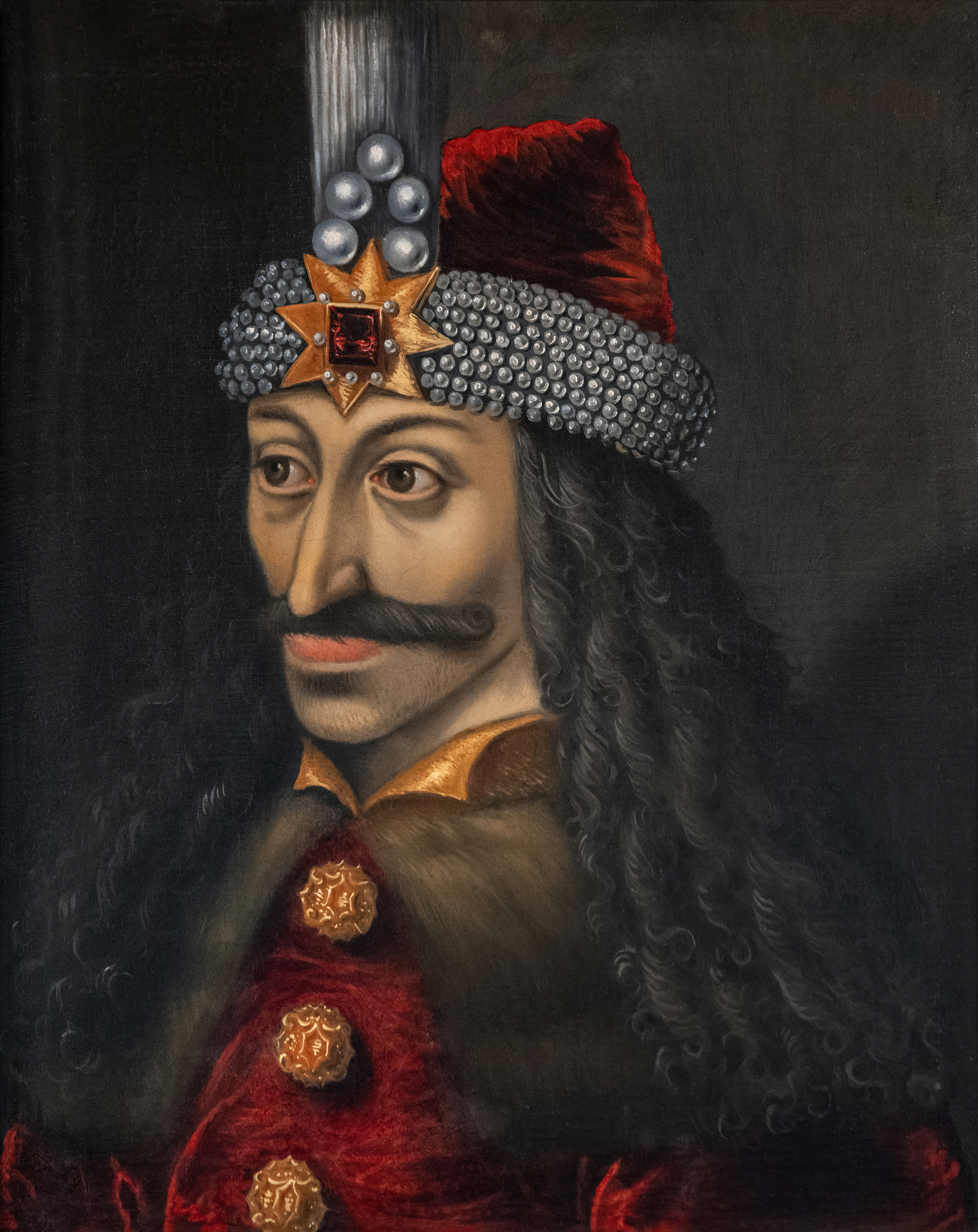
Vlad Țepeș (Dracula) by Ambras Castle

The Ottomans tried without success to bring Wallachia under their control by putting their own candidate on the throne. They regarded the region as a buffer zone with the Kingdom of Hungary and, for a yearly tribute, did not meddle in their internal affairs. To prevent Wallachia from falling under Hungarian suzerainty, the Ottomans freed young Vlad Dracula III and his brother Radu cel Frumos, so that Vlad could claim the throne of Wallachia. His rule was short-lived, as John Hunyadi invaded Wallachia and restored his ally Vladislav II of Wallachia of the House of Dănești to the throne.

Vlad III Dracula fled to Moldavia, where he lived under the protection of his uncle, Bogdan II of Moldavia. In October 1451, Bogdan was assassinated and Vlad fled to Hungary. Impressed by Vlad's vast knowledge of the mindset and inner workings of the Ottoman Empire, as well as his hatred towards the Turks and Mehmed II, Hunyadi reconciled with his former enemy and tried to make Vlad III his own adviser, but Vlad refused. In 1456, while the Ottomans threatened Hungary at the Siege of Belgrade, Vlad III led a contingent into Wallachia, reconquered his native land, and killed Vladislav II.

In 1459, Mehmed II sent envoys to Vlad III to urge him to pay a delayed tribute of 10,000 ducats and 500 recruits into the Ottoman forces. Vlad III refused and had the Ottoman envoys killed by nailing their turbans to their heads, on the pretext that they had refused to raise their hats to him, as they only removed their headgear before God. Meanwhile, the sultan sent Hamza Pasha to make peace and, if necessary, eliminate Vlad III. The Ottomans were ambushed and impaled, with Hamza Pasha impaled on the highest stake.

In the winter of 1462, Vlad III crossed the Danube and scorched the entire Bulgarian land in the area between Serbia and the Black Sea. Mehmed II launched an attack against Vlad III in Wallachia but suffered many casualties in the surprise Night Attack at Târgoviște. Vlad's policy of staunch resistance against the Ottomans was not popular, and he was betrayed by Stephen III of Moldavia among others. Vlad III had to retreat to the mountains.

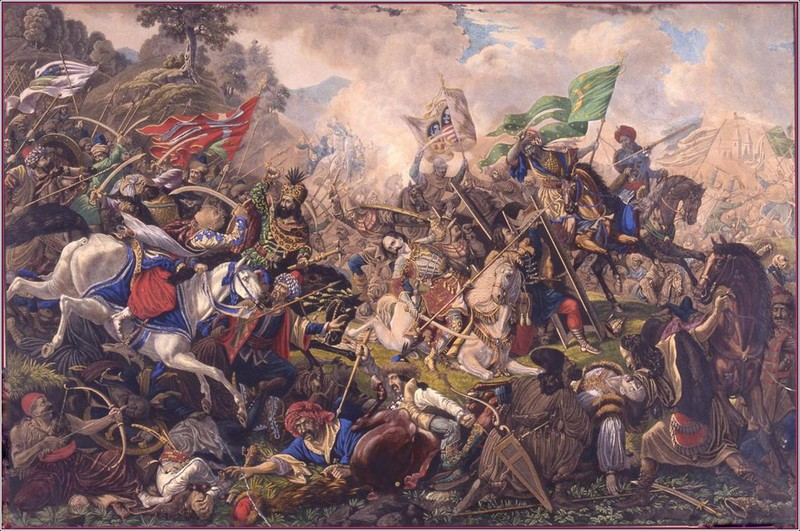
Battle of Breadfield by Eduard Gurk

After this, the Ottomans captured the Wallachian capital Târgoviște and withdrew, having left Radu as ruler of Wallachia. Turahanoğlu Ömer Bey fought with distinction and wiped out a force of 6,000 Wallachians and deposited 2,000 of their heads at the feet of the sultan. He was later reinstated in Thessaly. Vlad eventually escaped to Hungary, where he was imprisoned on a false accusation of treason against his overlord, Matthias Corvinus. The situation in Wallachia remained stable until the end of the Ottoman-Venetian War when the Ottomans were defeated in the Battle of Breadfield on 13 October 1479.

=== Trebizond ===
The Empire of Trebizond was formed after the fall of Constantinople in 1204 and remained independent after the restoral of the Byzantine Empire in 1261. Emperor since 1429, John IV of Trebizond forged an alliance by marrying his daughter to the son of his brother-in-law Uzun Hasan, ruler of the Aq Qoyunlu, in return for his promise to defend Trebizond. He also secured promises of support from Sinope, Karamania and Georgia. The Ottomans attempted to capture Trebizond or to get an annual tribute since the time of Murad II. During the Siege of Belgrade in 1456, the Ottoman governor of Amasya attacked Trebizond, and although he was defeated, he took many prisoners and extracted a heavy tribute.

After John's death in 1459, his brother David of Trebizond came to power and intrigued with various European powers for help against the Ottomans, speaking of wild schemes that included the conquest of Jerusalem. Mehmed II eventually heard of these intrigues and was further provoked to action by David's demand that Mehmed remit the tribute imposed on his brother.

Mehmed's response came in the summer of 1461. He led a sizable army from Bursa by land and the Ottoman navy by sea, first to Sinope. Having isolated Trebizond, Mehmed quickly swept down upon it before the inhabitants knew he was coming, and began the Siege of Trebizond. The city held out for a month before surrendering on 15 August 1461.

=== Bosnia ===
On 10 July 1461, Thomas of Bosnia died, and Stephen Tomašević succeeded him on the throne of the Kingdom of Bosnia. Tomašević made an alliance with the Hungarians and asked Pius II for help in the face of an impending Ottoman invasion. In 1463, after a dispute over the tribute paid annually by Bosnia to the Ottomans, he then sent for help from the Venetians which was not forthcoming. In 1463, Mehmed II led an army into the country, beginning the Ottoman conquest of Bosnia. The royal city of Bobovac soon fell, leaving Tomašević to retreat to Jajce and later to Ključ. Mehmed conquered Bosnia very quickly, executing Tomašević and his uncle Radivoj of Bosnia. Bosnia officially fell in 1463 and became the westernmost province of the Ottoman Empire.

=== Aq Qoyunlu ===
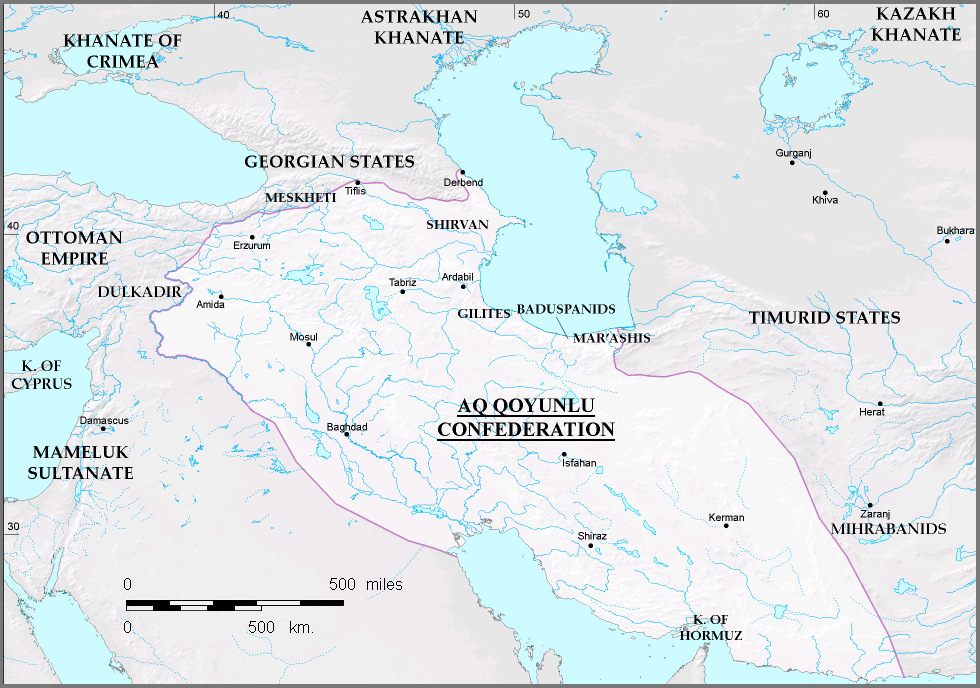
The Aq Qoyunlu confederation at its greatest extent under Uzun Hasan

At the end of the 14th century, the Karamanids the most important of the Anatolian beyliks. At that time, the Ottomans began to dominate most of the region, reducing the Karaman influence and prestige. İbrahim II of Karaman was the ruler of Karaman, and during his last years, his sons began struggling for the throne. His heir apparent was İshak of Karaman, but Pir Ahmet, a younger son, declared himself as the bey of Konya. İbrahim escaped to the western territories where he died in 1464. The competing claims to the throne resulted in an interregnum.

With the help of Uzun Hasan, the sultan of the Aq Qoyunlu, İshak was able to ascend to the throne. His reign was short, however, as Pir Ahmet appealed to Mehmed II for help, offering Mehmed some territory that İshak refused to cede. After defeating İshak, Pir Ahmet kept his promise and ceded a part of the beylik to the Ottomans, but he was uneasy about the loss. So, during the Ottoman campaign in the West, he recaptured his former territory. Mehmed returned and captured much of the region in 1466 and, few years later, Gedik Ahmet Pasha captured the coastal region of the beylik.

Pir Ahmet as well as his brother Kasım escaped to Uzun Hasan's territory. This gave Uzun a chance to interfere. In 1472, the Aq Qoyunlu army invaded and was decisively defeated by the Ottomans at the Battle of Otlukbeli on 11 August 1473. When Uzun Hasan died in 1478, he was succeeded by his son Ya'qub Beg, serving as sultan until 1490. The last Aq Qoyunlu leader, Sultan Murad, brother of Alwand, was also defeated by Shah Ismail, founder of the Safavid dynasty of Iran. Though Murad briefly established himself in Baghdad in 1501, he soon withdrew back to Diyar Bakr, signaling the end of the Aq Qoyunlu rule.

=== Albania ===
The Albanian Principalities were united by Skanderbeg, a nobleman and former member of the Ottoman ruling elite, under the League of Lezhë in 1444. In the spring of 1466, Mehmed II marched with a large army against Skanderbeg and the Albanians. Skanderbeg had repeatedly sought assistance from Italy, and believed that the ongoing Ottoman–Venetian War offered a golden opportunity to reassert Albanian independence. For the Venetians, the Albanians provided a useful cover to the Venetian coastal holdings of Durrës and Shkodër. The major result of this campaign was Mehmet's construction of the fortress at Elbasan. The fortress cut Albania effectively in half, isolating Skanderbeg's base in the northern highlands from the Venetian holdings in the south. In early 1467, Skanderbeg defeated Ballaban Pasha and lifted the Second Siege of Krujë. Mehmed responded by marching again against Albania and pursued the attacks against the Albanian strongholds, while sending detachments to raid the Venetian possessions to keep them isolated. The Ottomans failed again at the Third Siege of Krujë in 1467. However, the winter brought an outbreak of plague which sapped the strength of the local resistance. Skanderbeg himself died of malaria in the Venetian stronghold of Lezhë, ending the ability of Venice to use the Albanian lords for its own advantage.

After Skanderbeg died, Mehmed II personally led the Siege of Shkodra, begun in 1478. The Venetians and Shkodrans resisted the assaults and continued to hold the fortress until Venice ceded Shkodra to the Ottoman Empire in the Treaty of Constantinople in 1479 as a condition of ending the war.

=== Moldavia ===
The Ottomans had been threatening Moldavia since 1420, and in 1456, Peter III Aaron agreed to pay an annual tribute to ensure his southern borders, the first Moldavian ruler to accept the Turkish demands. His successor Stephen the Great rejected Ottoman suzerainty and a series of fierce wars ensued. Stephen tried to bring Wallachia under his sphere of influence and so supported his own choice for the Wallachian throne. This resulted in an enduring struggle between different Wallachian rulers backed by Hungarians, Ottomans, and Stephen. An Ottoman army was sent in 1475 to punish Stephen for his meddling in Wallachia, suffering defeat at the Battle of Vaslui on 10 January 1475. In response, Mehmed II assembled a large army and entered Moldavia, meeting Stephen at the Battle of Valea Albă on 26 July 1476 where the Ottomans were victorious.

Stephen retreated into northern Moldavia and formed another army. The Ottomans were unable to conquer any of the Moldavian strongholds of Suceava, Neamț and Hotin, and were constantly harassed by small scale Moldavian attacks. Soon they were also confronted with starvation, a situation made worse by an outbreak of the plague, and the Ottoman army left. Not until 1538 did the principality became a tributary to the Ottoman Empire, but still retaining internal and partial external autonomy.

=== Death of Mehmed II ===
An Ottoman army led Gedik Ahmed Pasha began the Ottoman invasion of Otranto. Because of lack of food, Gedik returned to Albania, leaving a small garrison behind. Since it was only 28 years after the fall of Constantinople, there was some fear that Rome would suffer the same fate and plans were made to evacuate the Rome. Sixtus IV repeated his 1481 call for a crusade. In 1481, Ferdinand I of Naples raised an army and besieged Otranto starting 1 May 1481. Mehmed marched with out the Ottoman army but died on 3 May 1481, causing great rejoicing in Europe. He was succeeded by his eldest son Bayezid II.

== Anti-Turkish Crusades ==
By the late 1430s, the papacy was increasingly alarmed at the Muslim threat to both Byzantium and eastern Europe lands, and began calling for anti-Turkish crusades. A number of rulers, in particular Alfonso the Magnanimous, Philip the Good and Alfonso V of Portugal, supported a series of popes in launching or planning military campaigns against the Ottoman Turks, who were expanding their empire in the eastern Mediterranean and threatening the Christian states of Europe.

=== Eugene IV ===
Martin V, pope since 1417, died in 1431 and was succeeded by Eugene IV. Eugene supported efforts to stem the Turkish advance, pledging one-fifth of the papal income to the Crusade of Varna which set out in 1443, but which met with overwhelming defeat at the Battle of Varna.

Following the arrival of the first African captives in Lisbon in 1441, Henry the Navigator asked the pope to designate Portugal's raids along the West African coast as a crusade, a consequence of which would be the legitimization of enslavement for captives taken during the crusade. On 19 December 1442, Eugene issued the bull Illius qui se pro divini, in which he granted full remission of sins to those who took part in any expeditions against the Muslims.

=== Nicholas V ===
Nicholas V succeeded Eugene IV on 6 March 1447. In late spring of 1452, Byzantine emperor Constantine XI wrote to Nicholas for help against the impending siege by Mehmed II. On 18 June 1452, Nicholas issued the bull Dum Diversas authorizing Afonso V of Portugal to attack Muslims, pagans and other enemies of Christ wherever they may be found. After the fall of Constantinople, he responded by calling for an anti-Turkish crusade which never materialized.

=== Philip the Good ===
Philip the Good was the Duke of Burgundy, but had no fixed seat of government, moving between various palaces in Brussels, Bruges, and Lille.

==== Feast of the Pheasant ====
Philip founded the Order of the Golden Fleece in 1430 as one of the great Catholic orders of chivalry in Europe. The knights of his Order frequently travelled throughout his territory to participate in tournaments. Philip planned a crusade against the Ottoman Empire, launching it at the Feast of the Pheasant on 17 February 1454 in Lille, but his plan never materialized.

==== Louis XI of France ====
When Louis XI of France came to the throne in 1461, Philip remained keen on initiating a crusade. However, he needed funds to organize such an enterprise. Louis gave him 400,000 gold crowns for the crusade in exchange for a number of territories, including Picardy and Amiens. However, Philip's son Charles I of Burgundy was angry about this transaction, feeling that he was being deprived of his inheritance. He joined a rebellion called the League of the Public Weal, led by Louis's brother Charles, the Duke of Berry. Although the rebels were largely unsuccessful in battle, the king had no better luck. Louis XI fought an indecisive battle against the rebels at Montlhéry and was forced to grant an unfavourable peace as a matter of political expediency.

=== Crusade of Pius II ===
Pius II was elected pope in August 1458 and, like his predecessor Callixtus II, was keenly interest in a new crusade.

==== Council of Mantua ====
Pius convened the Council of Mantua in May 1458 to promote such an expedition. By the time the council was disbanded in January 1460, an ineffectual call for a new crusade against the Turks had been decided upon, and proclaimed by on 14 January 1460. One of the only European rulers to fully endorse the crusade was Vlad III Dracul, though he was too preoccupied defending his native Wallachia to contribute troops.

==== The last Crusade ====
By 1463, Pius' crusade project seemed near to fruition. Cristoforo Moro, the new Doge of Venice, seemed to favor the expedition. Matthias Corvinus, at peace at last with emperor Frederick III, was eager for a Christian alliance. Philip of Burgundy showed a welcome interest. So did Skanderbeg, the leader of Albanian resistance, who on 27 November 1463 declared war on the Ottomans and attacked their forces near Ohrid. The pope tried diplomacy, addressing a letter to Mehmet II, urging him to become a Christian. The bull Ezechielis prophetae was issued on 22 October 1463 and mirrored Pius' optimism. But as the months passed, the enthusiasm faded. Only the Hungarians, who already faced a Turkish war, offered him material support. The Venetians hesitated, and none of the Italian cities were willing to risk the loss of trade with the Ottomans. Philip of Burgundy wrote that the plots of the king made it impossible for him to leave his lands. The pope decided that he would finance and lead the crusade himself. On his orders his agents assembled a fleet of galleys at Ancona. On 18 July 1464, he took the Cross at a ceremony at Saint Peter's.

A few days later he set out for the port of embarkation. His attendants saw that he was a dying man. They hid the truth from him that not one of the princes of Europe had followed his example and that no armies were marching behind him to embark in his galleys for the East. Instead, as he came near to Ancona, they drew the curtains of his litter across so that he should not see out. For the roads were covered with the crews from his fleet, who had deserted their ships and were hurrying homeward. He reached Ancona only to die there, on 14 August 1464. He was mercifully spared the knowledge of the utter collapse of his Crusade.

=== Polish–Ottoman War ===
The Polish-Ottoman War of 1485–1503 was a series of conflicts between the Kingdom of Poland and the Ottoman Empire. In the war, Poland was supported by its fiefs, the Duchy of Mazovia, the Teutonic Order and Lithuania. The Ottomans were allied with the Crimean Khanate and Moldavia. An initial Polish victory at the Battle of Zasław in 1491 led to the Moldavian Campaign of 1497–1499. The Poles met with defeat at the Battle of the Cosmin Forest in 1497. On 13 July 1498, John I Albert signed a treaty with Hungary agreeing to cooperate against the Ottomans. On 15 August 1499, Moldavia accepted the truce, and on 9 October 1503, Alexander I Jagiellon signed a five-year peace treaty with Bayezid II.

== Thirteen Years' War ==
After the defeat of the Teutonic Knights at the Battle of Grunwald in 1410, internal conflicts led to an uprising by the Prussian Confederation, representing the local Prussian nobility and cities, who sought the protection of Casimir IV Jagiellon. This resulted in the Thirteen Years' War, a conflict fought in 1454–1466 between the Crown of the Kingdom of Poland and the Teutons.

On 18 September 1454, the Teutons defeated the Polish army at the Battle of Chojnice. The defeat was a near disaster and many Polish cities were recovered by the Order. Impressed by the crusaders' victory, some Prussian lands also capitulated. This was a great victory for the Teutonic Knights, although they lacked enough money to pay the large mercenary force that they employed. As the Order was short on cash since the expensive First Peace of Thorn of 1411, Grand Master Ludwig of Erlichshausen handed over the Order's headquarters at Marienburg Castle to his mercenaries in lieu of pay during the war. They then sold it to the Polish king who entered the castle in June 1457. The Order had to move its capital to Königsberg. In 1455, the Neumark was sold to the Electorate of Brandenburg under the terms of the Treaties of Cölln and Mewe.

The Polish victory at the Battle of Świecino on 17 September 1462 changed the course of the war. After that battle, the Poles were able to take the offensive. On 27 July 1463, Polish commander Piotr Dunin began the Siege of Mewe. Because of the great strategic importance of the city and castle, the Teutons sent reinforcements under commander Henry Reuss of Plauen, later Grand Master, and the mercenary Bernhard von Zinnenberg. On 15 September 1463, the Teutonic navy was destroyed by 30 ships from Danzig and Elbing in the Battle of Zatoka Świeża. Soon after the battle, von Zinnenberg, with approval of the Teutonic Order, made a treaty with Poland, withdrawing from the war but retaining in his possession a few castles in Culmerland. Mewe capitulated on 1 January 1464.

The Thirteen Years' War was a victory for Poland, ending with the Second Peace of Thorn. The Teutonic Order became a Polish fief and its Grand Masters had to commit to homage to the Polish king within six months of acquiring power. This was honored for the next two centuries. The Teutonic Order also returned Eastern Pomerania to Poland after nearly 150 years and ceded the bishopric of Warmia, which together formed the so-called Royal Prussia, as both lands fell under direct rule of the Polish king. Tension quickly flared up afterward, and this was soon followed by the War of the Priests from 1467 to 1479, a drawn-out dispute over the independence of Warmia, in which the Knights sought revision of the peace. They yet again lost to Poland, which held onto its gains.

== Crusade of 1456 ==
Nicholas V died on 24 March 1455 and Alfosnso de Borgia was elected pope at the advanced age of 67 as a compromise candidate in the conclave of 8 April 1455, taking the name Calixtus III.

=== Calixtus III ===
While Nicholas V had made every effort to stop the Ottomans, Constantinople fell to the invaders in 1453. Even as cardinal, Calixtus III was concerned with organizing Western Europe against the Turkish invasion and, upon his election, he set to carry out his campaign. Papal ambassadors were dispatched to all the countries of Europe to join in a final effort to check the dangers presented by the Turks. Missionaries were sent to England, France, Germany, Hungary, Portugal and Aragon to preach the crusade, to secure volunteers for military service, to collect the necessary taxes, and to engage the prayers of the faithful for the success of the enterprise.

But Western Europe was slow in responding to the pope's call. Frederick III, through his hatred of Ladislaus the Posthumous, was unwilling to join a movement where Hungary could an immediate advantage. The bishops and electors were opposed to the collection of the papal tax for the crusaders. England and France were at war and refused to allow their forces to be weakened by participation in these plans. Genoa did organize a fleet and dispatch it against the Turks, but only to lay herself open to attack by Aragon, while Portugal withdrew the fleet that it had dispatched.

=== Siege of Belgrade ===
After the fall of Constantinople, Mehmed II rallied his resources to subjugate the Kingdom of Hungary. His immediate objective was the Belgrade Fortress. John Hunyadi, the Count of Temes and captain-general of Hungary, who had fought many battles against the Turks in the previous two decades, prepared the defenses of the fortress.

The Siege of Belgrade began as a military blockade of Belgrade on 4 July 1456. The siege escalated into a major battle, during which Hunyadi led a sudden counterattack that overran the Ottoman camp, ultimately compelling the wounded Mehmed II to lift the siege and retreat on 22 July 1456. The battle had significant consequences, as it stabilized the southern frontiers of the Kingdom of Hungary for more than half a century and thus considerably delayed the Ottoman advance in Europe. On 29 June 1456, Callixtus III ordered the church bells to be rung at noon as a call to prayer for the welfare of those defending Belgrade. To commemorate this victory, Callixtus III ordered the Feast of the Transfiguration to be held annually on 6 August.

== Liberation of Cyprus ==
The Mamluk invasion of Cyprus began in 1424, and on 7 July 1426, the Cypriot army was routed at the Battle of Khirokitia and their king Janus was captured in battle. On 18 July 1426, the Mamluks embarked for home and Janus was brought to the sultan and was forced to pay a large ransom and agree to an annual tribute. From that point on, Cyprus was a tributary state to the Mamluks until annexed by Venice in 1488.

While Janus was captive in Cyprus, the nobles and the royal family members were trying to deal with an on-going rebellion and concurrently trying to achieve the release of Janus. With help from Europe, the rebellion was repressed after ten months. The rebels' leader was arrested and was tortured and executed in Nicosia on 12 May 1427, the same day that Janus arrived in Paphos from Cairo. Janus died in 1432 and was succeeded by his son John II of Cyprus. John also served as the titular king of Jerusalem until his death in 1458.

At the age of fourteen, John's daughter Charlotte of Cyprus became queen and was crowned at St. Sophia Cathedral on 7 October 1458. Charlotte's reign was not successful. She had a tenuous hold on the kingdom as her right to the throne was constantly being challenged by her illegitimate half-brother James II of Cyprus. On 7 October 1459, she married Louis of Savoy in a marriage arranged by the Genoese who promised their assistance in retaining her crown against the claims by James. In 1460, James captured Famagusta and Nicosia with aid from the Egyptian sultanate of Sayf ad-Din Inal. After being blockaded in the castle of Kyrenia for three years, Charlotte and Louis fled to Rome in 1463.

James II died in 1474 and his wife Catherine Cornaro became monarch when their son James III of Cyprus died in August 1474 before his first birthday. He died of natural causes even though it was rumored that he had been poisoned by Venice or Charlotte's partisans. The kingdom had long since declined, and had been a tributary state of the Mamluks since 1426. But under Catherine, the island was essentially controlled by Venetian merchants with vested economic interests in Cyprus.

In 1488, there were fears that Ottoman sultan Bayezid II intended to attack Cyprus. The Venetians also discovered a plot to marry Catherine to Alfonso II of Naples, and they decided to recall the queen to Venice and formally annex the island. In February 1489, the Venetian government persuaded Catherine to cede her rights as ruler of Cyprus to the doge of Venice Agostino Barbarigo—and therefor to the Venetian government as a whole—as she had no heir.

== Otranto Crusade ==
In 1479, the Ottomans proposed an alliance with Venice which was declined. However, the Signoria gave indications to Mehmed II that it would be his right to seizing Brindisi, Taranto, and Otranto. Early in the summer of 1480, admiral Gedik Ahmed Pasha received orders from Mehmed to cross the Strait of Otranto.

On 28 July 1480, an Ottoman fleet arrived at the city and began the Siege of Otranto. The garrison and the citizens of Otranto retreated to the city's castle. On 11 August 1480, after a 15-day siege, Gedik Ahmed ordered the final assault. When the walls were breached the Ottomans methodically passed to house to house and sacked, looted and set the city on fire. A total of 12,000 were killed and 5,000 were enslaved, including victims from the territories of Salento, and the cathedral was turned into a mosque.

Since only 27 years had passed since the fall of Constantinople, there was some fear that Rome would suffer the same fate. Plans were made for the pope and the citizens to evacuate the city. Sixtus IV repeated his 1471 call for a crusade. Several Italian city-states, Hungary and France responded positively. The Republic of Venice did not do so, as it had signed an expensive peace treaty with the Ottomans in 1479.

In April 1481, Sixtus IV called for an Italian crusade to liberate the city, and Christian forces besieged Otranto in May. An army was raised by Ferdinand I of Naples, to be led by his son Alfonso II of Naples. A contingent of troops was provided by Matthias Corvinus. A year later, the Ottoman garrison surrendered the city after a siege by Christian forces which began on 1 May 1481, uncertainty upon the death of sultan Mehmed II and the intervention of papal forces that were led by Paolo Fregoso of Genoa. The Portuguese expedition to Otranto arrived too late.

== Granada War ==
The Granada War was the culmination of the Reconquista, ending Islamic rule on the Iberian peninsula. During the reign of Isabella I of Castile and Ferdinand II of Aragon, the Catholic Monarchs were pitted against the Nasrid dynasty's Emirate of Granada.

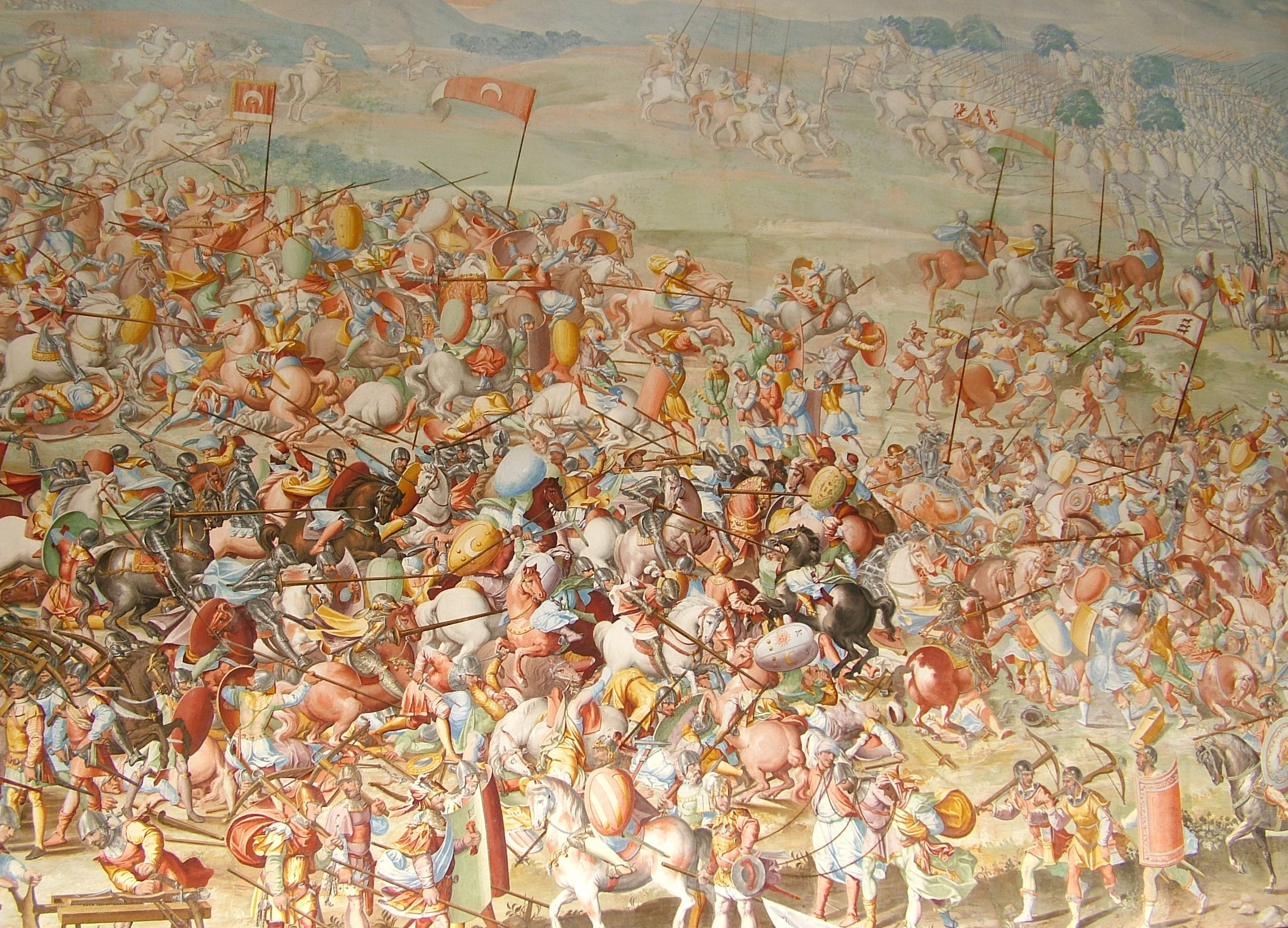
Battle of La Higueruela

The fifteenth century began with a Castilian victory at the Battle of Collejares in 1406. This was accompanied by four sieges of Gibraltar between 1411 and 1467 (known as the sixth through ninth sieges). The Battle of La Higueruela was fought near Granada on 1 July 1431 between the forces of John II of Castile, led by Álvaro de Luna, and troops loyal to Muhammed IX, Nasrid sultan of Granada. The battle was a modest victory for the forces of Castile, with no territorial gain and failing to take Granada. Following this battle, John II of Castile installed Yusuf IV, grandson of Muhammed VI, as sultan. This was followed with a Castilian victory at the Battle of Los Alporchones on 17 March 1452.

In April 1483, the Castilian victory at the Battle of Lucena resulted in the capture of Muhammad XI, the last Nasrid ruler of Granada. Muhammad's father Abu'l-Hasan Ali was then restored as ruler of Granada, to be replaced in 1485 by his uncle Muhammad XII. In 1487, Muhammad XI obtained his freedom and Christian support to recover his throne by consenting to hold Granada as a tributary kingdom under the Catholic monarchs and not interfere in future military actions. Málaga was the main objective of the 1487 campaign by the Catholic Monarchs against the Emirate of Granada, which had been steadily losing territory to the Crown of Castile forces. The Siege of Málaga began on 7 May 1487 and was finally successful on 18 August. The loss of the emirate's second largest city and its most important port was a major loss for Granada. Most of the surviving population of the city were enslaved or put to death by the conquerors.

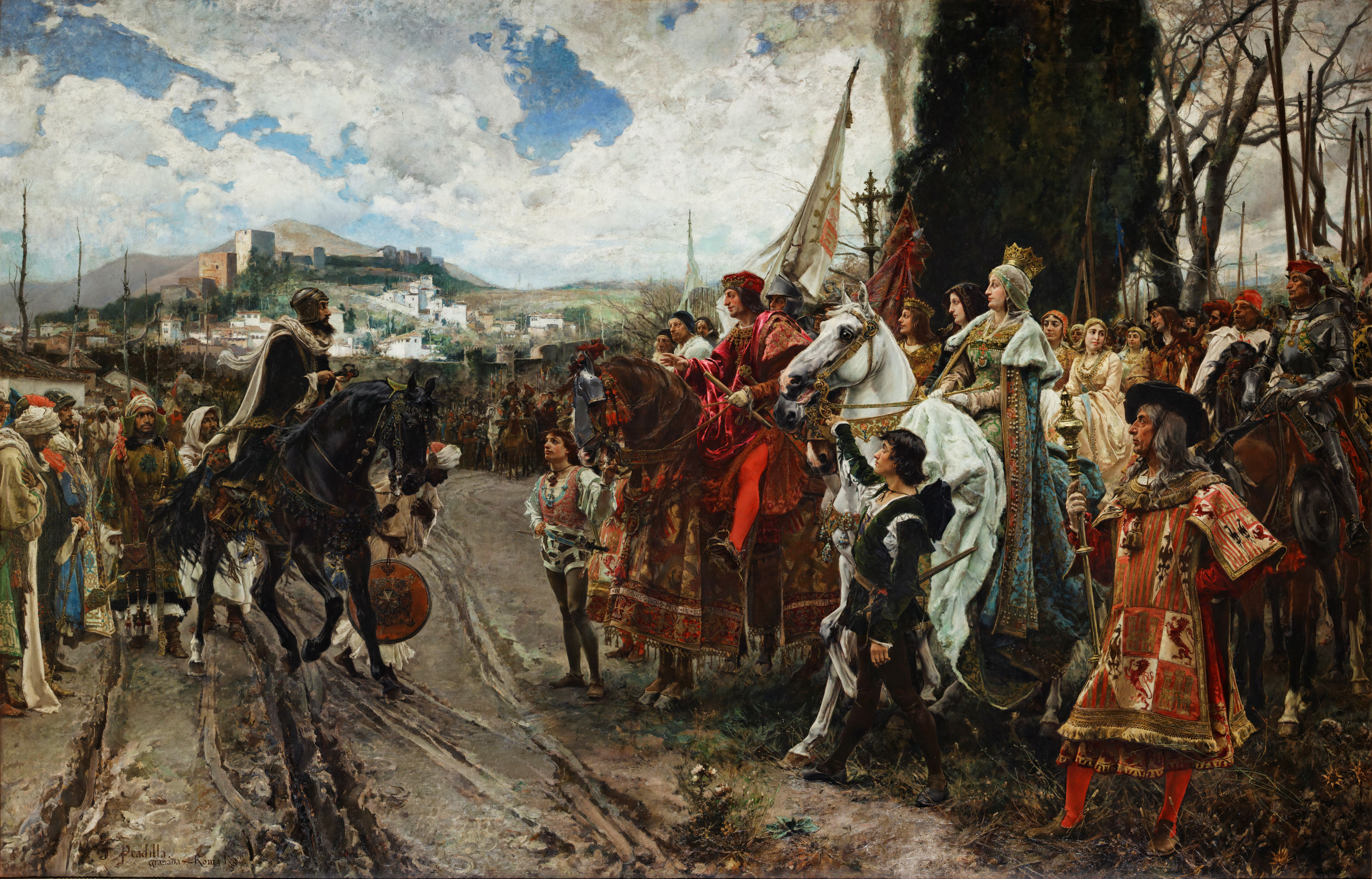
The Surrender of Granada by Francisco Pradilla Ortiz. Muhammad XI surrenders to Ferdinand and Isabella

The Nasrid–Ottoman relations were not consequential in this conflict and the eight-month Siege of Granada began in April 1491. The situation for the defenders grew progressively dire, as their forces for interfering with the siege dwindled and advisers schemed against each other. Bribery of important officials was rampant, and at least one of the chief advisers to Muhammad XI seems to have been working for Castile the entire time. The Treaty of Granada, was signed on 25 November 1491, which granted two months for the city to surrender. After the terms, which proved rather generous to the local Muslim population, were negotiated, the city capitulated on 2 January 1492. The besieging Christians sneaked troops into the Alhambra that day in case resistance materialized, which it did not. Granada's resistance had come to its end. The Reconquista was over.

== Bibliography ==
- Atiya, Aziz Suryal (1934). The Crusade of Nicopolis. Methuen & Company, Limited. ISBN 9780404154103.
- Atiya, Aziz Suryal (1938). The Crusade in the Later Middle Ages. Methuen. ISBN 9780527037000.
- Atiya, Aziz Suryal (1975a). The Crusade in the Fourteenth Century (PDF). A History of the Crusades (Setton), Volume III.
- Atiya, Aziz Suryal (1975b). The Aftermath of the Crusades (PDF). A History of the Crusades (Setton), Volume III.
- Babinger, Franz (1978). Mehmed the Conqueror and his Time. Princeton University Press. ISBN 9780691010786.
- Barker, John W. (1969). Manuel II Palaeologus (1391-1425): A Study in Late Byzantine Statesmanship. Rutgers University Press. ISBN 9780813505824.
- Beazley, Raymond (1923). Prince Henry the Navigator. New York, G. P. Putnam's sons.
- Bernardini, Michele (2016). Tīmūr and the Frankish Powers (PDF). In Norman Housley (ed.). The Crusade in the Fifteenth Century.
- Bishko, Charles Julian (1975). The Spanish and Portuguese Reconquest, 1095-1492 (PDF). A History of the Crusades (Setton), Volume III.
- Bosworth, Clifford Edmund (2004). The New Islamic dynasties: A Chronological and Genealogical Manual. Edinburgh University Press. ISBN 9780748621378.
- Bryce, James (1892). The Holy Roman Empire. London, Macmillan and co.
- Buttigieg, Emanuel; Phillips, Simon (2016). Islands and Military Orders, c.1291-c.1798. Routledge. ISBN 9781317111962.
- Çelik, Siren (2021). Manuel II Palaiologos. Cambridge University Press. ISBN 9781108874038.
- Chasin, Martin (1989). The Crusade of Varna (PDF). A History of the Crusades (Setton), Volume VI.
- Chaytor, Henry John (1933). A History of Aragon and Catalonia. Methuen. ISBN 9780404014797.
- Creasy, Edward Shepherd (1878). History of the Ottoman Turks from the beginning of their empire to the present time. New York, H. Holt.
- Christiansen, Eric (1997). The Northern Crusades. Penguin Publishing Group. ISBN 9780140266535.
- Disney, A. R. (2009). A History of Portugal and the Portuguese Empire. Cambridge University Press. ISBN 9780511813337.
- Dyer, Thomas Henry (1861). The history of modern Europe. London, J. Murray. ISBN 978-1-02-234462-4.
- Fine, John V. A. (1994). The Late Medieval Balkans: A Critical Survey from the Late Twelfth Century to the Ottoman Conquest. University of Michigan Press. ISBN 9780472082605.
- Florescu, Radu (2009). Dracula, Prince of Many Faces: His Life and Times. Little, Brown. ISBN 9780316092265.
- France, John (2006). The Crusades and the Expansion of Catholic Christendom, 1000-1714. Routledge. ISBN 9781134196180.
- Freely, John (2009). The Grand Turk Sultan Mehmet II Conqueror of Constantinople and Master of an Empire. Overlook. ISBN 9781590204498.
- Frost, Robert (2015). The Oxford History of Poland-Lithuania. Oxford University Press. ISBN 9780191746345.
- Geanakoplos, Deno John (1975). Byzantium and the Crusades, 1354–1453 (PDF). A History of the Crusades (Setton), Volume III.
- Ghazarian, Jacob G. (2000). The Armenian Kingdom in Cilicia During the Crusades. Curzon. ISBN 9780700714186.
- Gibbon, Edward (1870). The Crusades. London: A. Murray and Son.
- Gifford, John (1792). The History of France. London, Printed for C. Lowndes and W. Locke.
- Grousset, René (1934). Histoire des croisades et du royaume franc de Jérusalem. Plon, Paris.
- Grousset, René (1935). L'Épopée des croisades. Paris: le Club français du livre.
- Grousset, René (1970). The Empire of the Steppes: A History of Central Asia. Translated by Naomi Walford. Rutgers University Press. ISBN 9780813513041.
- Harvey, Leonard Patrick (1992). Islamic Spain from 1250 to 1500. University of Chicago Press. ISBN 9780226319629.
- Hazard, Harry W. (1975). Moslem North Africa, 1049–1394 (PDF). A History of the Crusades (Setton), Volume III.
- Hazlitt, William Carew (1900). The Venetian Republic. A. and C. Black, London.
- Heymann, Frederick Gotthold (1975). The Crusades against the Hussites (PDF). A History of the Crusades (Setton), Volume III.
- Hinterberger, Martin; Schabel, Chris (2011). Greeks, Latins, and Intellectual History 1204-1500 (PDF). Peeters.
- Housley, Norman (1992). The Later Crusades, 1274-1580: From Lyons to Alcazar. Oxford University Press. ISBN 9780198221371.
- Housley, Norman (2004). Housley, Norman (ed.). Crusading in the Fifteenth Century: Message and Impact. Springer Link. doi:10.1057/9780230523357. ISBN 9781403902832.
- Housley, Norman (2016). The Crusade in the Fifteenth Century. Taylor & Francis Group. ISBN 9781315615158.
- Howarth, Stephen (1982). Knights Templar. Marboro Books, New York. ISBN 9780002164528.
- Imber, Colin (2002). The Ottoman Empire 1300–1650. Palgrave Macmillan. ISBN 9780333613863.
- Imber, Colin (2013). The Crusade of Varna 1443-1445. Ashgate Publishing Limited. ISBN 9781472416940.
- İnalcık, Halil (1989a). The Ottoman Turks and the Crusades, 1329–1451 (PDF). A History of the Crusades (Setton), Volume VI.
- İnalcık, Halil (1989b). The Ottoman Turks and the Crusades, 1451–1522 (PDF). A History of the Crusades (Setton), Volume VI.
- Jackson, Peter (2005). The Mongols and the West: 1221–1410. Pearson Longman. ISBN 9780582368965.
- Johnson, Edgar N. (1975). The German Crusade on the Baltic (PDF). A History of the Crusades (Setton), Volume III.
- Jučas, Mečislovas (2009). The Battle of Grünwald. National Museum. ISBN 9786099507453.
- Kastritsis, Dimitris (2007). The Sons of Bayezid. Brill. ISBN 9789047422471.
- Kendall, Paul M. (1971). Louis XI The Universal Spider. W. W. Norton. ISBN 978-0-393-05380-7.
- Kiaupa, Zigmantas (2000). The History of Lithuania Before 1795. The University of Michigan Press. ISBN 9789986810131.
- Kurkjian, Vahan M. (1958). History of Armenia. Armenian General Benevolent Union of America.
- Lane-Poole, Stanley (1901). History of Egypt in the Middle Ages. A History of Egypt; v. 6. Methuen, London. ISBN 9780790532042.
- Lardner, Dionysius (1833). History of Spain and Portugal. Philadelphia: Carey & Lea.
- Lock, Peter (1995). The Franks in the Aegean 1204-1500. Routledge. ISBN 9780582051393.
- Lock, Peter (2006). The Routledge Companion to the Crusades. Routledge. doi:10.4324/9780203389638. ISBN 9780415393126.
- Luke, Harry (1975). The Kingdom of Cyprus, 1369–1489 (PDF). A History of the Crusades (Setton), Volume III.
- Luttrell, Anthony T. (1975). The Hospitallers at Rhodes, 1306–1421 (PDF). A History of the Crusades (Setton), Volume III.
- Luttrell, Anthony I. (2001). The Military Orders. The Oxford Illustrated History of The Crusades.
- Michaud, Joseph–François (1881). The History of the Crusades. Translated by William Robson. Published by George Routledge and Sons.
- Lützow, Francis (1914). The Hussite Wars. London, J. M. Dent & sons.
- Miller, William (1983). Essays on the Latin Orient. AMS Press. ISBN 9780404170240.
- Mixson, James (2022). The Crusade of 1456. University of Toronto Press. ISBN 9781487505769.
- Moore, Clement Clarke (1850). George Castriot, surnamed Scanderbeg, king of Albania. New York, D. Appleton & company.
- Muir, William (1896). The Mameluke or Slave dynasty of Egypt. London, Smith, Elder.
- Murray, Alan V. (2001). Crusade and Conversion on the Baltic Frontier 1150–1500. Ashgate. ISBN 9780754603252.
- Murray, Alan V. (2006). The Crusades—An Encyclopedia. ABC-CLIO. ISBN 9781576078624.
- Murray, Alan V. (2009). The Clash of Cultures on the Medieval Baltic Frontier. Ashgate. ISBN 9780754664833.
- Mutafian, Claude; Otten-Froux, Catherine (1993). Le Royaume Arménien de Cilicie. University of Michigan. ISBN 9782271051059.
- Nicol, Donald M. (1993). The Last Centuries of Byzantium, 1261–1453. Cambridge University Press. ISBN 9780521439916.
- Nicolle, David (2005). Constantinople 1453, The End of Byzantium. Praeger. ISBN 9780275988562.
- Plum, Harry Grant (1906). The Teutonic order and its secularization. Iowa City, the University.
- Prescott, William H. (1856). History of the reign of Ferdinand and Isabella the Catholic. Boston: Phillips, Sampson.
- Riley-Smith, Jonathan (2001). The Oxford Illustrated History of The Crusades. Oxford University Press. ISBN 9780192854285.
- Rossi, Ettore (1975). The Hospitallers at Rhodes, 1421–1523 (PDF). A History of the Crusades (Setton), Volume III.
- Roux, Jean-Paul (1993). Histoire de l'Empire mongol. Fayard. ISBN 9782213031644.
- Runciman, Steven (1954). A History of the Crusades, Volume Three: The Kingdom of Acre and the Later Crusades. Cambridge University Press. ISBN 9780521347723.
- Runciman, Steven (1965). The Fall of Constantinople 1453. Cambridge University Press. ISBN 9780521398329.
- Runciman, Steven (2009). Lost Capital of Byzantium The History of Mistra and the Peloponnese. I. B. Tauris. ISBN 9780857718105.
- Russell, Peter E. (2000). Prince Henry the Navigator A Life. Yale University Press. ISBN 9780300082333.
- Setton, Kenneth M. (1969). A History of the Crusades. University of Wisconsin Press.
- Setton, Kenneth M. (1975). The Catalans and Florentines in Greece, 1380–1462 (PDF). A History of the Crusades (Setton), Volume III.
- Setton, Kenneth M. (1976). The Papacy and the Levant, 1204–1571, Volume II, The Fifteenth Century. American Philosophical Society. ISBN 9780871691149.
- Setton, Kenneth M. (1989). The Ottoman Turks and the Crusades 1451-1522 (PDF). A History of the Crusades (Setton), Volume VI.
- Sinor, Denis (1975). The Mongols and Western Europe (PDF). A History of the Crusades (Setton), Volume III.
- Sterns, Indrikis (1985). The Teutonic Knights in the Crusader States (PDF). A History of the Crusades (Setton), Volume V.
- Stewart, Angus Donal (2001). The Armenian Kingdom and the Mamluks. Brill. ISBN 9789004122925.
- Stone, Daniel (2001). The Polish-Lithuanian State 1386-1795. University of Washington Press. ISBN 9780295980935.
- Taaffe, John (1852). The history of the Holy, military, sovereign order of St. John of Jerusalem. Oxford University. ISBN 9780353547513.
- Topping, Peter (1975). The Morea, 1364–1460 (PDF). A History of the Crusades (Setton), Volume III.
- Turnbull, Stephen (2005). Tannenberg 1410 Disaster for the Teutonic Knights. Praeger. ISBN 9780275988609.
- Tyerman, Christopher J. (1985). "Philip VI and the Recovery of the Holy Land". The English Historical Review. 100 (394): 25–52. JSTOR 569926.
- Tyerman, Christopher (1996). England and the Crusades, 1095–1588. University of Chicago Press. ISBN 0226820122.
- Urban, William L. (2003). The Teutonic Knights. Greenhill. ISBN 9781853675355.
- Villari, Pasquale (1910). Mediaeval Italy from Charlemagne to Henry VII. London: T. Fisher Unwin.
- Waterson, James (2007). The Knights of Islam: The Wars of the Mamluks. London: Greenhill Books. ISBN 9781853677342.
- Wolff, Robert Lee (1969). The Latin Empire of Constantinople, 1204–1312 (PDF). A History of the Crusades (Setton), Volume II.
- Woodhouse, F. C. (1879). The Military Religious Orders of the Middle Ages. Pott, Young & Co., New York.
- Ziyādaẗ, Muḥammad Muṣṭafā (1975). The Mamluk Sultans, 1291–1517 (PDF). A History of the Crusades (Setton), Volume III.
