= List of wars involving ancient and medieval Spain =

This list details ancient and medieval Spain's involvement in wars and armed conflicts.

== Ancient ==
Conflict	Combatant 1	Combatant 2	Results
Phoenician colonization of the Iberian Peninsula (700s–500s BC) Location: Iberian Peninsula and Mediterranean Sea	Iberians Tartessos Supported by: Greek Mediterranean colonies	Phoenicia: Carthage; Celts: Celtiberians	Carthaginian victory: Cádiz, Cartagena (Qart-Hadast), Ibiza, Málaga (Malaka), Barcelona, Huelva, Almuñécar, Lebrija, Tarragona (Tarraco), Melilla etc. are founded by Phoenicians and then Carthaginians (escaping from Babylonian and Neo-Assyrian Empire).; Fall of Tartessos Civilization as an indirect consequence of the Greco-Carthaginian Battle of Alalia and Celtic invasions.
Sicilian Wars (580–265 BC): Battle of Himera (480 BC); Battle of Selinus; Battle of Himera (409 BC); Siege of Akragas (406 BC); Battle of Gela (405 BC); Sack of Camarina; Siege of Syracuse (397 BC); Battle of the Himera River (311 BC); Location: Mediterranean Sea	Carthage: Carthaginian Iberia; Iberian mercenaries Balearic slinger	Greek city-states of Sicily, led by Syracuse	Stalemate: Carthage retains Western Sicily and the Greeks the eastern part.; Carthaginian Iberia is established and recognised.; Dionysius I of Syracuse recruits Iberian renegades (due to the treason of Himilco) as his Personal Guard since 396 BC.
Peloponnesian War (431–404 BC) Location: Ancient Greece and Eastern Mediterranean	Peloponnesian League (led by Sparta) Boeotian League (led by Thebes) Delphi Phocis Doris Ambracia Macedon (up until 421 BC) Syracuse Iberian mercenaries Supported since 413 by: Tissaphernes (Achaemenid empire) (413 - 408 BC), Cyrus the Younger (since 408 BC)	Delian League (also called Athenian Empire) (led by Athens) Thessaly Plataea Argos Acarnania Elis (418 BC) Mantinea (418 BC) Segesta (415-413 BC) Etruscans (415-413 BC)	Spartan victory: Alcibiades establish a pro-Greek network of recruitment in the Iberian Peninsula through Greek Sicily.
Theban–Spartan War (378–362 BC) Location: Ancient Greece	Sparta and allies: Syracuse; Iberian mercenaries	Thebes and allies: Achaemenid empire	Theban victory: End of Spartan hegemony; Start of Theban hegemony
Iberian Guards' mutiny against Dionysius II of Syracuse (361 BC) Location: Greek Sicily	Iberian mercenaries	Syracuse	Victory: Dionysius II of Syracuse do not reduce the payment of the Iberians, and even increase it (according to Plato).
Syracuse–Mamertines War (274 –270 BC) Location: Greek Sicily	Syracuse Iberian mercenaries	Mamertines	Syracuse victory: Carthaginian mediation to save Mamertines from the anhilation, being confinated in Messina.; Polybius mentions that the Iberian mercenarias were betrayed by Hiero II of Syracuse and then anhilated by the Mamertines.; Hiero II became Tyrant of Syracuse.; Further Roman intervention to aid Mamertines, which led to the First Punic War.
First Punic War (264–241 BC) Location: Mediterranean Sea (modern Italy and Tunisia)	Carthage: Carthaginian Iberia; Syracuse (until 263 BC) Mercenaries: Ligures; Celts; Hispans; Balearic; Numidians; Gauls; Libyans	Roman Republic Mamertines Syracuse (since 263 BC)	Roman victory: Roman Sicily is established.
Mercenary War (241–237 BC) Location: North Africa, Sardinia and Corsica	Insurgents: Carthage's mutinous army; Rebellious African town	Carthage	Carthaginian victory: The multinational mercenaries are repressed by Hamilcar Barca in Africa.; Sardinia and Corsica are ceded to Rome by the rebelling mercenaries.; The human and economic losses forced Carthage to turn its sights towards new territories to colonize and far from the sphere of influence of Rome, thus beginning the conquest of the Iberian Peninsula.
Barcid conquest of Hispania (237–218 BC): Battle of Helike; Battle of the Tajo; Location: Carthaginian Iberia	Iberians; Celtiberians	Carthage	Carthaginian victory: Expansion of Carthaginian Iberia
Roman conquest of the Iberian Peninsula (220–17 BC): Second Punic War; Celtiberian Wars; Lusitanian War; Numantine War; Sertorian War; Cantabrian Wars; Location: Iberian Peninsula, Western Europe, Italian Peninsula, North Africa and Mediterranean Sea	Pre-Roman Iberians: Astures; Cantabrians; Gallaec; Iberians; Celts; Aquitanians; Arevaci; Lusones; Lusitanians; Vaccaei; Vettones; Belli; Titii; Roman popularis exiles	Roman Republic Celtic tribes vassal to Rome: Cynetes; Turdetani	Roman victory: Annexation of Iberian Peninsula to the Roman Empire
Carthage–Gadir conflict (220s) Location: Cádiz, present-day Spain	Carthaginian Iberia: Gadir	Carthage	Defeat: Carthaginians reconquer Cadiz through the use of Battering ram for the first time in the region (according to Vitruvius).
Siege of Saguntum (219 BC) Location: Saguntum, present-day Spain	Saguntines	Carthage	Carthaginian victory: Beginning of the Second Punic War
Second Punic War (Spring 218 – 201 BC): Battle of Cissa; Battle of Ebro River; Battle of Ibera; Battle of the Upper Baetis; Battle of New Carthage; Battle of Baecula; Battle of Ilipa; Battle of Carteia; Battle of Carteia (naval); Part of the Punic Wars; Location: Western Mediterranean	Carthage: Syracuse (214–212 BC); Western Numidia; Others	Rome; Eastern Numidia; Syracuse (218–215 BC); Others	Roman victory: Roman conquest of Carthaginian Iberia; Carthaginian African territories reduced
Indibilis and Mandonius Revolt (206–205 BC): Mutiny at Sucro; Part of Roman conquest of Hispania; Location: Iberian Peninsula	Ilergetes Ausetani Sedetani Celtiberians; Roman mutineers	Roman Republic: Hispania	Roman victory
Iberian revolt (197–195 BC): Part of Roman conquest of Hispania; Location: Iberian Peninsula	Iberian rebels: Celtiberians; Indigetes; Bergistani; Lacetani; Suessetani; Ausetani	Roman Republic: Hispania; Ilergetes	Roman victory: Re-establishment of Roman control over Hispania
First Celtiberian War (181–179 BC): Part of Celtiberian Wars and Roman conquest of Hispania; Location: Iberian Peninsula	Celtiberian tribes Vaccaei Vettones	Roman Republic: Hispania	Roman victory: Rome conquers certain tribes but allows them to keep their autonomy
Second Celtiberian War (154–151 BC): Part of Celtiberian Wars and Roman conquest of Hispania; Location: Iberian Peninsula	Celtiberian tribes: Belli; Titii; Arevaci; Vaccaei	Roman Republic: Hispania	Roman victory: Roman influence increases over Celtiberians
Lusitanian War (155–139 BC): Part of Roman conquest of Hispania; Location: Iberian Peninsula	Roman Republic: Hispania; Celtic tribes become vassals of Rome: Cynetes; Turdetani	Lusitanian tribes Celtic tribes: Vettones; Gallaeci; Others	Roman victory: Pacification of Lusitania (modern Portugal between the rivers Tagus and Douro and Extremadura, Spain)
Numantine War (143–133 BC): Part of Roman conquest of Hispania; Location: Iberian Peninsula	Roman Republic: Hispania	Arevaci; Lusones; Vaccaei; Vettones	Roman victory: Expansion of Roman territory through Celtiberia
Roman conquest of Gallaecia (132–19 BC): Part of Roman conquest of Hispania; Location: Iberian Peninsula	Gallaeci Celts	Roman Republic: Hispania	Roman victory
Roman conquest of Majorca (123–121 BC): Part of Roman conquest of Hispania; Location: Iberian Peninsula	Balearic slinger	Roman Republic: Hispania	Roman victory
Jugurthine War (111–105 BC) Location: North Africa (modern Algeria)	Roman Republic: Hispania; Mauretania (from 105 BC)	Numidia Mauretania (107-105 BC)	Roman victory
Sertorian War (80–72 BC): Part of Crisis of the Roman Republic and Roman conquest of Hispania; Location: Iberian Peninsula	Roman popularis exiles Native Iberians Native Celts Native Aquitanians	Roman Senate	Roman senate victory
Gallic Wars (58–50 BC) Location: Gaul (modern France)	Roman Republic Auxilia forces: Numidians; Cretans; Hispans; Balearic; Germanics; Celts	Gauls Germanics Ancient Britons	Roman victory: Roman Gaul is established.
Caesar's civil war (49–45 BC): Battle of Ilerda; Siege of Corduba; Part of Crisis of the Roman Republic; Location: Hispania, Italia, Graecia, Illyria, Aegyptus, Africa	Pompeians: Optimates; Numidia Ptolemaic kingdom Pontus	Caesarians: Populares; Mauretania	Caesarian victory
Antony's Atropatene campaign (36 BC): Part of Roman–Parthian Wars; Location: Middle East	Roman Republic Armenia Galatia Cappadocia Pontus Herodian Kingdom of Judea	Parthian Empire Atropatene Hasmonean Kingdom	Draw: Parthian expels Romans (which included Iberian cavalry).
Cantabrian Wars (29–19 BC): Part of Roman conquest of Hispania; Location: Iberian Peninsula	Astures Cantabri Gallaeci	Roman Empire: Hispania	Roman victory
Roman conquest of Britain (43–84)	Roman Empire: Roman Italy; Hispania; Roman Gaul	Celtic Britons	Roman victory: Roman Britain is established.; Rise of the Legio IX Hispana.
First Jewish–Roman War (66–73): Part of Jewish–Roman wars; Location: Roman Palestine	Roman Empire	Judean provisional government Supported by: Adiabene volunteers; Zealots Galileans Peasantry faction Idumaeans (Note: Fought alongside the Zealots and Galileans during the coup of 68 AD; some later joined Simeon bar Giora during the events of 69–70 AD) Sicarii	Roman victory: Destruction of Jerusalem and the Second Temple. Formation of the Jewish diaspora.; The Cohors II Cantabrorum (Unit recruited in Hispania) settles in Syria and Capadocia.
Year of the Four Emperors (68–69): Battle of Bedriacum; Location: Western Europe	Galba to Otho Loyals to Galba: Hispania Tarraconensis; Lusitania; Gallia Aquitania; Sequani; Otho to Vespasian Loyals to Otho: Hispania; Roman Italy; Numidia; Loyals to Vespasian: Roman Egypt; Roman Syria; Roman Judaea; Roman Illyria; Raetia; Moesia	Galba to Otho Loyals to Nero: Germania Superior; Gallia Lugdunensis; Loyals to Otho: Praetorian Guard; Otho to Vespasian Loyals to Vitellius: Germania Superior; Batavi; Roman Gaul	Stalemate: Galba deposse Nero and repress Lucius Clodius Macer revolt in Africa.; Death of Gaius Julius Vindex.; Otho depose Galba, then Otho is deposed by Vitellius.; Rise of the Flavian dynasty and of Lucius Verginius Rufus.; Start of the Revolt of the Batavi against Vespasian.; The Spanish Legio VII Gemina is consolidated.; Vespasion grants Roman citizenship to all the population of Hispania in the year 74.
Revolt of the Batavi (69–70) Location: Modern Netherlands	Roman Empire: Germania Inferior; Roman Gaul; Roman Britain; Hispania	Celtic and Germanic tribes from Gallia Belgica: Batavi; Cananefates; Frisii; Lingones; Treveri	Roman victory: Subjugation of the Batavi
Domitian's Dacian War (86–88): Part of Dacian Wars; Location: Balkans	Roman Empire	Dacian Kingdom	Dacian victory: The Cohors I Cantabrorum is nearly annihilated, joining their remnants to the Cohors II Cantabrorum (both of the Iberian Cantabri auxilia forces).
Maurétanie Tingitane's Revolt against Antonino Pius (144–152) Location: North Africa [modern Morocco]	Roman Empire: Hispania	Mauretania Tingitana: Mauri	Roman victory through the engages from the Legio VII Gemina, Cohors I Gallica Equitata civium romanorum and Ala II Flavia Hispanorum civium Romanorum.
Moorish War (170-180s): Raid on Baetica (170–171); Legio VII Gemina Revolt (171); Location: Strait of Gibraltar	Roman Empire: Hispania	Mauri raiders	Mauri Razzia against Hispania Baetica are stopped.
Battle of Lugdunum (197): Part of the Year of the Five Emperors; Location: Lugdunum (modern Lyon)	Loyals to Clodius Albinus: Hispania; Roman Britain	Loyals to Septimius Severus: Pannonia, Illyricum; Moesia; Dacia	Severan victory: Severus remodelled the Imperial cult sanctuary to celebrate his dominance and humiliate Albinus' provincial supporters.; The Legio VII Gemina changed its name to the Legio VII Gemina Felix Pia.
Crisis of the Third Century (235–285 AD) Location: Western Europe, Central Europe, Southern Europe, North Africa, Middle East	Roman Empire: Roman Italy; Hispania; Roman Illyria; Roman Greece; Roman Mauretania; Roman Libya; Roman Anatolia	Roman usurpers: Gallic Empire; Palmyrene Empire; Sasanian Persia Germanic tribes: Goths; Alemanni; Vandals; Carpians	Roman victory: Gallic Empire fails in its attempt to control Hispania (conquered the Tarraconense and Lusitania from 261 to 269).; Emperor Aurelian re-conquers both the Palmyrene and Gallic Empires, and emperor Diocletian puts an end to the civil war.; A detachment of the Legio VII Gemina settles in the Eastern Mediterranean.
Frankish incursions to Roman Empire (250s-260s): Frankish raid on Tarraco (254); Frankish raid on Hispania (258); Frankish raid on North-Western Mediterranean Hispania Coast (262); Frankish raid on Tarraco (264); Location: Western Europe and North Africa	Roman Empire: Roman Gaul; Hispania; Roman Italy; Roman Mauretania	Germanic tribes: Franks; Suebi; Alamanni	Frankish victory: Tarraco is looted and Hēmeroskopeion is destroyed.; Spanish Levant is raided.; Interruption in exportation of olive oil supplies from Baetica to Italy.; Germanic tribes cross Strait of Gibraltar to sack Roman Africa.
Invasions in the West of the Empire (258–260): part of Barbarian invasions into the Roman Empire of the 3rd century; Location: Western Europe and Southern Europe	Roman Empire: Hispania; Roman Gaul; Roman Italy	Germanic tribes: Franks; Alemanni; Marcomanni; Quadi; Iazyges; Roxolani	Roman victory and invasion repelled
Frankish-Alemanni Invasion of Hispania (270–277) Location: Western Europe and North Africa	Roman Empire: Roman Mauretania; Hispania; Roman Gaul	Germanic tribes: Franks; Alemanni	Frankish victory: Pamplona, Astorga, Mérida and Lisbon are sacked.; Empúries is destroyed.; Construction of fortifications and walls begins around Hispania.; Ruralization of the economy in Hispania.; Roman Africans' urban centers became devastated, abandoning continental Tingitania and subjecting to the Diocese of Hispania.
Magnus Maximus' Revolt (383–388): Battle of Poetovio; Location: Western Europe	Western Roman Empire (loyal to Magnus Maximus): Hispania; Roman Britain; Roman Gaul	Eastern Roman Empire (loyal to Theodosius I) Western Roman Empire (loyal to Valentinian II): Roman Italy; Roman Illyria; Pannonia; Roman Africa; Germanic peoples	Defeat: Fall of Gratian, Hispania secured by Valentinian II and rise of Theodosius I.; Start of the End of Roman rule in Britain.; Priscillianism is repressed as an heresy.; The Franks under Marcomer invades northern Gaul
Roman civil war of 407–415 and Gothic War in Spain (416–418) Location: Western Europe	Western Roman Empire: Hispania; Roman Britain; Roman Gaul; Roman Italy	Constantine III's Britain Usurpation Gerontius' Hispanic Usurpation Priscus Attalus' Italian Usurpation Barbarians: Franks; Visigoths; Vandals; Alans; Suebi	Roman Pirric Victory: Honorius reunifies the Western Empire but loses territory to the Germanic peoples; Maximus of Hispania is deposed
Crossing of the Rhine (406–411): part of Germanic invasions; Location: Western Europe and Southern Europe	Western Roman Empire: Hispania; Roman Gaul; Roman Italy; Foederati; Franks	Sarmatian and Germanic Barbarians: Alans; Asding; Silingi; Suebi; Roman usurpers	Defeat: Start of Barbarian invasions into the Roman Empire. Hispania is divided among the barbarian peoples: Lusitania and Carthaginensis are assigned to the Alans.; The Adsingian Vandals, with their king Gunderic at the head, settle in eastern Gallaecia.; The Suebi occupy western Atlantic Gallaecia.; The Silingian Vandals (led by Fredbalus) obtain Baetica.; Tarraconensis, the Balearic Islands and Mauretania Tingitana are excluded from the first divisions.
Invasion of Roman Gallaecia by the Germanic Suebi (409): Part of Fall of the Western Roman Empire; Location: Iberian Peninsula	Hispania: Lusitania	Germanics: Suebi; Quadi; Marcomanni; Buri	Germanic victory: Kingdom of the Suebi settled in Hispania (Galicia) by Hermeric
Invasion of Hispania by the Germanic Vandals (409): Part of Fall of the Western Roman Empire and Germanic Invasions of Hispania; Location: Iberian Peninsula	Hispania: Lusitania	Germanics: Vandals; Silingi; Hasdingi; Sarmatian Alans	Germanic victory: Vandals Kingdoms settled in Baetica and Gallaecia, near Vandals; Alans settled in Lusitania
Invasion of Hispania by the Germanic Visigoths (410): Part of Fall of the Western Roman Empire and Germanic Invasions of Hispania; Location: Iberian Peninsula	Hispania: Lusitania	Germanics: Visigoths	Visigothic victory: Visigothics settles on Hispania
Visigothic Campaign on Hispania (416–418): Battle of the Nervasos Mountains; Part of Germanic Invasions of Hispania; Location: Iberian Peninsula and Southern France	Western Roman Empire Kingdom of the Suebi Visigoths	Vandals: Silingi; Alans	Roman-Visigothic victory: Wallia got a Visigothic settlement in Aquitania by the Romans, leaving Hispania
Asterius campaign in Gallaecia (419): Part of Germanic Invasions of Hispania; Location: Iberian Peninsula	Suebi Hispania	Hasdingi Vandals	Roman-Suevi Victory
Vandal war of 422 (422): Battle of Tarraco; Part of Germanic Invasions of Hispania; Location: Iberian Peninsula	Hispania	Hasdingi Vandals Sarmatian Alans	Roman defeat: Vandals gain control of Baetica
Vandal pirate incursions on the Mediterranean (424–429) Location: Iberian Peninsula, North Africa and Balearic Islands	Hispania: Hispania Balearica; Mauretania Tingitana	Hasdingi Vandals	Vandal victory
War between the Alans and the Suevi (428): Battle of Mérida (428); Part of Germanic Invasions of Hispania; Location: Iberian Peninsula	Suebi Hispania	Sarmatian Alans	Defeat at the Battle of Mérida
War between the Visigoths and the Vandal–Alanic alliance (429): Part of Germanic Invasions of Hispania; Location: Iberian Peninsula	Visigothic Kingdom	Vandals Sarmatian Alans	Visigoth victory: Vandals and Alans move to North Africa, then establish Vandal Kingdom
Bagaudae Revolts (284–456)	Western Roman Empire: Roman Gaul; Hispania (since 441)	Bagaudae: Peasant rebels; Germanic tribes: Suebi	Roman victory
Gothic War in Spain (456): Battle of Órbigo (456); Part of Germanic Wars and Germanic Invasions of Hispania; Location: Iberian Peninsula	Western Roman Empire Visigothic Kingdom Burgundians Franks	Suebi	Visigothic victory: Sack of Braga
Gothic War (457–458): Battle of Arelate; Part of Gothic Wars and Germanic Invasions of Hispania; Location: Iberian Peninsula and Gallia	Western Roman Empire	Visigothic Kingdom	Roman victory: Visigoths had to relinquish their recent conquests in Hispania and return to federal status
Roman reconquest of Hispania (459–461): Battle of Cartagena (461); part of Vandalic Wars; Location: Iberian Peninsula, Mediterranean Sea	Western Roman Empire Huns	Suebi Vandal Kingdom	Inconclusive: Victory against Suebi. Majorian reconquers Hispania for Romans for the last time, but his final campaign against the Vandals is canceled; Vandals conquer Balearic Islands
Visigoth invasion of Hispania (461): Paer of Germanic Invasions of Hispania; Location: Iberian Peninsula	Hispania	Visigothic Kingdom	Indecisive
Visigoth conquest of Hispania (469–474): Part of Germanic Invasions of Hispania and Fall of the Western Roman Empire; Location: Iberian Peninsula	Hispania Suebi	Visigothic Kingdom	Visigoth victory: Roman empire, Julius Nepos recognise the conquests of Euric, Visigoth Lord of Hispania

== Medieval ==
Conflict	Combatant 1	Combatant 2	Results
First Franco-Visigothic war (496–498) and Franco–Gothic War (507–511) Location: Southern France	Visigothic Kingdom Supported by: Kingdom of the Ostrogoths Kingdom of the Burgundians (pre-507) Alemanni	Frankish kingdom Supported by: Armorica Kingdom of the Burgundians (post-507) Eastern Roman Empire	Frankish victory: Gallia Aquitania is annexed by the Franks under Clovis I
Burdunellus Revolt (496–497) Location: Iberian Peninsula	Visigothic Kingdom	Hispano-Romans	Visigothic victory: Burdunellus is killed by Brazen bull
Tarraconense Revolt (507) Location: Iberian Peninsula	Visigothic Kingdom	Hispano-Romans	Visigothic victory: Petrus is executed in Tortosa
Conflict over the succession of Alaric II (507–514): Battle of Barcelona (512); Location: Iberian Peninsula	Visigothic rebels Frankish kingdom	Ostrogothic Kingdom: Ostrogothic Spain	Ostrogothic victory: Theodoric the Great got the regency over Hispania during the reign of Amalaric
Vandalic War (533–534): part of Vandalic Wars; Location: North Africa, Balearic Islands, Sardinia, Corsica and Mediterranean Sea	Vandal Kingdom: Balearic domains	Byzantine Empire	Byzantine victory: Byzantine dominion over Balearic Islands under Byzantine North Africa
Gothic War (535–554): Part of Justinian's campaign for Renovatio Imperii; Location: Italian Peninsula, Sicily, Dalmatia	Ostrogothic Kingdom; Franks; Alamanni; Burgundians; Visigothic Kingdom	Byzantine Empire Huns Heruli Sclaveni Lombards	Byzantine victory against Ostrogoths, then plans for revenge against Visigoths due to its support to Ildibad and Totila
Childebert I campaigns against Spain (531–542) Location: Iberian Peninsula	Visigothic Kingdom	Frankish kingdom	Frankish victory: The Merovingian Queen Clotilde is liberated from her abusive marriage with the Visigothic King Amalaric (who dies in Barcelona).; Pamplona and Zaragoza are raided.; Brought back to Paris is the tunic of Saint Vincent.
Visigothic revolts against Agila I (550–554) Location: Iberian Peninsula	Visigothic Kingdom loyal to Agila I: Arianists	Visigoths loyals to Athanagild Hispano-Romans from Córdoba: Nicene Christians; Byzantine Empire	Rebels victory and legitimation for a Byzantine intervention on Spain
Byzantine conquest of Visigothic Baetica (551–555): Part of Justinian's campaign for Renovatio Imperii; Location: Iberian Peninsula and Balearic Islands	Visigothic Kingdom	Byzantine Empire	Byzantine victory
Visigothic conquest of Spania (570–624) Location: Iberian Peninsula	Visigothic Kingdom	Byzantine Empire	Visigothic victory
Visigothic conquest of Córdoba (572) Location: Iberian Peninsula	Visigothic Kingdom	Byzantine Empire	Visigothic victory
Visigothic conquest of Sabaria (573) Location: Iberian Peninsula	Visigothic Kingdom	Sappi	Visigothic victory
Visigothic conquest of Cantabria (574) Location: Southern France	Visigothic Kingdom	Cantabri	Visigothic victory
Second Visigothic–Suevic War (575–577) Location: Iberian Peninsula	Visigothic Kingdom	Kingdom of the Suebi	Visigothic victory
Visigothic–Vasconic War (581) Location: Iberian Peninsula and Pyrenees	Visigothic Kingdom	Vascones	Visigothic victory
Third Visigothic–Suevic War (585–586) Location: Iberian Peninsula	Visigothic Kingdom	Kingdom of the Suebi	Visigothic victory
First Muslim invasion of Iberian Peninsula (650s): Military campaigns under Caliph Uthman and Arab–Byzantine wars; Location: Iberian Peninsula and Mediterranean Sea	Visigothic Kingdom co-beligerant: Byzantine Empire	Rashidun Caliphate: Arab and Berber forces	Stalemate: Initial Muslim victory, conquering the coastal areas of Iberian Peninsula and establishing some colonies on the coast of Spain to help the Muslim conquest of the Maghreb; Areas lost soon after due to the general disorder in the Muslim empire, re-occupied by Visigoths
Byzantine incursion against Visigoth Spain (694/702/703) Location: Southern Iberian Peninsula and Mediterranean Sea	Visigothic Kingdom	Byzantine Empire	Visigothic victory: Theodemir success in the defense of the Visighotic Mediterranean coasts
Muslim incursions on the Balearic Islands (8th century–10th century): part of Arab–Byzantine wars; Location: Balearic Islands and Western Mediterranean Sea	Byzantine Empire: Byzantine North Africa; Byzantine Balearic Islands; Carolingian Empire (799–815)	Umayyad Caliphate (until 750) Emirate of Córdoba (since 759)	Arab victory: Muslim conquest of Majorca. It becomes the Eastern Islands of Al-Andalus
Visigothic Civil War (710–711) Location: Iberian Peninsula	Achila II forces from northeast Hispania	Roderic forces from southwest Hispania	Inconclusive due to Arab-Berber Invasion
Umayyad conquest of Hispania (710–780): Part of Early Muslim conquests; Location: Iberian Peninsula and Mediterranean Sea	Visigothic Kingdom	Umayyad Caliphate	Umayyad victory Start of Spanish Reconquista
Umayyad invasion of Gaul (719–759): Campaign of Abd al-Rahman ibn Abd Allah al-Ghafiqi; Combat of Llívia; Battle of the River Garonne; Battle of Poitiers; Part of Early Muslim conquests; Location: Southern Gaul (now France)	Frankish kingdom: Duchy of Aquitaine; Lombard Kingdom Duchy of Gascony Vascones	Umayyad Caliphate: Wilayah of Al Andalus	Frankish victory: Franks conquers Septimania after the fall of Visigoths, expelling Arab-Berber settlers; Umayyad Caliphate retreat permanently to Iberia after the siege of Narbonne (752–759); End of Muslim attempts to conquer Western Europe
Battle of Covadonga (722): Part of the Reconquista; Location: Iberian Peninsula	Kingdom of Asturias	Umayyad Caliphate: Wilayah of Al Andalus	Asturian victory
Berber Revolt (740–743): Part of the Fitnas and Reconquista; Location: Iberian Peninsula and North Africa	Berber insurgents on North Africa and Hispania Kingdom of Asturias	Umayyad Caliphate: Al-Andalus (Moors); Ifriqiya (Fihrids); Syrian, Egyptian, Jordanian, Palestine junds of Bilad al-Sham	Arab victory just in al-Andalus and Ifriqiya; Establishment of several berber states on Maghreb (independence of Morocco); Alfonso I of Asturias add the northwestern provinces of Galicia and León to his kingdom and create a buffer zone in the Douro River valley (the "Desert of the Duero"); The Arab element on the Iberian Peninsula is increased, to the detriment of Berber, due to Middle Eastern migrants from the junds settlements (but also destabilizing the power of the governor of al-Andalus)
Yemeni Revolt on the Wali of Al-Andalus (745–756): Battle of Guadalete (745); Battle of Secunda (747); Siege of Zaragoza (754); Revolt in Zaragoza (755); Siege of Pamplona (755); Battle of Musarah (756); Battle of Alameda (756); Part of Third Fitna, Qays–Yaman rivalry and Reconquista; Location: Iberian Peninsula	1st phase Supports of Abu'l-Khattar al-Husam ibn Darar al-Kalbi: Qays units; Yaman units; Qahtanite units; 2nd phase Supports of Abd al-Rahman: Umayyad dynasty; Yaman units; Syrian junds; Revolt of Amer bin Amr al-Abdari: Abbasid; Basques of Pamplona	1st phase Supports of Tuwaba ibn Salama al-Judhami: Banu Lakhm units; Mudar units; Banu Judham units; Adnan units; 2nd phase Supports of Yusuf ibn Abd al-Rahman al-Fihri: Ma'addites; Fihrids; Qays; Berber	Initial victory of the north Arab faction in the first phase, then of the south Arab faction in the second phase; The fugitive Umayyad prince, Abd al-Rahman I, establishes an independent Emirate of Córdoba; End of al-Andalus rule by governors sent from Damascus or appointed by the recommendation of the Umayyad regional governors of Ifriqiya; Christian Iberic kingdom conquers territory of the Upper March
Abbasid attempt to conquer Al Andalus (763): Siege of Carmona (763); Location: Iberian Peninsula	Emirate of Córdoba: Umayyad dynasty	Abbasid Caliphate: Ifriqiya; Rebels led by Al-Ala ibn Mughith al-Judhami	Umayyad victory: Al-Mansur withdrew from Spain and focused on consolidating its authority in Persia; Abd al-Rahman I (grandson of Hisham ibn Abd al-Malik) became an independent emir of Córdoba and reached the first unification of Al-Andalus (Toledo, Zaragoza, Pamplona, Barcelona), including parts of western Maghreb. Considering themselves the authentic caliphate against Abbasid's pretension; Total independence of Al Andalus from the Caliphs of Baghdad. Spain never again came under the rule of an eastern caliph who ruled the Muslim world
Revolts against Emirate of Cordoba (771–774); Location: Iberian Peninsula	Emirate of Córdoba	Syrians rebels under Abd al-Ghaffar Arab and Berber tribes Abd al-Rahman's enemies	Revolts suppressed
Battle of Montecubeiro (774) Location: Iberian Peninsula	Kingdom of Asturias	Galician rebels	Asturian victory
Yemeni revolt on the Emirate of Cordoba (777 –781): Siege of Zaragoza (777); Iberian revolt in 778–779; Siege of Zaragoza (778); Zaragoza Muslim revolt in 781–783 Location: Iberian Peninsula and Mediterranean Sea	Arab wāli of Barcelona, Zaragoza and Girona Supported by: Abbasid Caliphate: Ifriqiya (Fihrids); Frankish kingdom (Carolingian Empire)	Emirate of Córdoba: Upper March; Umayyad dynasty	Revolt suppressed: Sulayman al-Arabi search for an alliance with Charlemagne at the Diet in Paderborn; Death of Abd al-Rahman ibn Habib al-Siqlabi, leader of the revolt; End of Abbasids' efforts to assert their rule in Al-Andalus and end of Fihrids prominence; Husayn of Zaragoza accepts a truce
Charlemagne's campaign in the Iberian Peninsula (778–816): Battle of Roncevaux Pass (778); Siege of Barcelona (801); Siege of Tortosa (808–809); Battle of Huesca (812); Battle of Majorca (813); Battle of Pancorbo (816); Iberian Naval campaign of Charlemagne; Part of Conquest of the Spanish March; Location: Iberian Peninsula, Southern France and Mediterranean Sea	Frankish kingdom (Carolingian Empire): Duchy of Gascony; County of Barcelona; County of Urgell; Papal States; supported by: Abbasids; Byzantine Empire	Emirate of Córdoba (Moors) Basques (Pagan) supported by: Banu Qasi	Initial Basque victory on the high Pyrenees; Consolidation of Omeya rule on Al-Andalus against Abbasids, but Saracens fail to conquer more lands on Western Europe for Islam; Carolingian Empire conquers the Balearic Islands and Spanish March for the Franks and the Catholic Church
Battle of the Burbia River (791): Part of the Reconquista; Location: Iberian Peninsula	Kingdom of Asturias	Emirate of Córdoba	Umayyad victory
Battle of Lutos (794): Part of the Reconquista; Location: Iberian Peninsula	Kingdom of Asturias	Emirate of Córdoba	Asturian victory
Battle of Las Babias (795): Part of the Reconquista; Location: Iberian Peninsula	Kingdom of Asturias	Emirate of Córdoba	Umayyad victory
Sack of Lisbon (798): Part of the Reconquista; Location: Iberian Peninsula	Kingdom of Asturias	Emirate of Córdoba	Asturian victory
Pamplona Revolt (799): Battle of Argantzon Gorge; Location: Basque Country	Vascones Kingdom of Asturias Carolingian Empire: Kingdom of Aquitaine; Duchy of Gascony; Wali of Huesca	Emirate of Córdoba: Banu Qasi; County of Sobrarbe	Frankish and Vascon victory: Velasco the Basque is ruler of the Kingdom of Pamplona
Andalusian raids on Sardinia (807–822): Part of Saracens incursions on Italy and Arab–Byzantine wars; Location: Mediterranean Sea, Sardinia	Emirate of Córdoba	Byzantine Empire: Byzantine Sardinia	Defeat
Louis the Pious' attempt to control the Hispanic March and Vasconia (814–824): Battle of Pancorbo; Battle of Roncevaux Pass (824); Location: Iberian Peninsula and Southern France	Carolingian Empire; Basques (Gascons)	Emirate of Córdoba; Basques (Navarrese, Aragonese); Qasawi Muslims (Moors)	Basque and Muslim victory: Navarre and Aragon became completely independent from the power of the Frankish rulers; Íñigo Arista become King of Pamplona
Andalusian occupation of Alexandria (814–828): Part of Fourth Fitna and Sarracens incursion on the Mediterranean; Location: Egypt and Mediterranean Sea	Emirate of Alexandria: Andalusian corsairs	Abbasid Caliphate: Arab Egypt; Tahirids	Defeat: Muslim Spaniards are expelled by Abdallah ibn Tahir al-Khurasani
Cordoban Razzias against Carolingian Empire (815–856): Razzia of 815; Razzia of 842; Razzia of 845; Razzia of 851; Razzia of 856; Location: Spanish March	Frankish kingdom (Carolingian Empire): Spanish March	Emirate of Córdoba	Mostly Muslim victories and successful sacks
Revolt of the Arrabal (818) Location: Iberian Peninsula	Emirate of Córdoba	Citizens of the suburb of Saqunda	Emirate victory
Andalusian conquest of Crete (824/827–829): Cretan expedition (828); Battle of Thasos; Part of Early Muslim conquests, Sarracens incursion on the Mediterranean and Arab–Byzantine wars; Location: Greek islands and Aegean Sea	Emirate of Crete: Andalusian corsairs	Byzantine Empire	Andalusian Victory
Aisso Revolt (826–827): Siege of Rueda Ter; Siege of Barcelona (827); Siege of Gerona (827); Location: Spanish March	Catalan counties: County of Osona; County of Razès; County of Conflent; Emirate of Córdoba	Carolingian Empire	Carolingian Victory: Bernard of Septimania gets control over Catalan counties
Muslim conquest of Sicily (827–902): Part of Early Muslim conquests, Saracens incursions on Italy and Arab–Byzantine wars; Location: Mediterranean Sea, Sicily	Abbasid Caliphate: Aghlabid emirate of Ifriqiya; occasional assistance from: Emirate of Cordoba Duchy of Naples	Byzantine Empire occasional assistance from: Venice	Aghlabid conquest of Sicily with Andalusian support
Carolingian Succession War (830–842): Frankish Civil War (830); Siege of Toulouse (844); Battle of Angumois (844); Location: Western Europe and Central Europe	Divisionists Forces: Charles the Bald; Louis the German; Supported by: Bernard of Septimania; Sunifred, Count of Barcelona	Imperialists Forces: Lothair I; Pepin II of Aquitaine; Supported by: William of Septimania	Divisionist victory: The Hispani refugees become vassals of Charles the Bald, and Septimania is annexed to West Francia
Rebellion of Musa Ibn Musa (840–850) Location: Northern Spain	Musa's revolters: Banu Qasi; Kingdom of Pamplona	Emirate of Córdoba	Draw: Musa becomes leader of Taifas after submitting again to the Emir; Pamplona is raided by Muslims, but maintain its independence
Viking expedition of 844: Viking raid on Seville; Viking raid on Galicia; Part of Viking raids on Iberian Peninsula; Location: Iberian Peninsula	Kingdom of Asturias: Kingdom of Galicia; Emirate of Córdoba: Banu Qasi	Norwegian Vikings of Noirmoutier Francia	Asturian and Córdoban victory
Battle of Albelda (851) Location: Iberian Peninsula	Kingdom of Asturias Duchy of Gascony West Francia	Emirate of Córdoba: Banu Qasi	Defeat
Battle of Guadalacete (852): Part of the Reconquista; Location: Iberian Peninsula	Kingdom of Asturias; Kingdom of Pamplona; Toledo rebels	Emirate of Córdoba	Defeat
¡Swedish raids in the Mediterranean Sea (859): Siege of Algeciras (859); Part of Viking raids on Iberian Peninsula and Viking raids on Balearic Islands; Location: Iberian Peninsula, Italian Peninsula and Mediterranean Sea	Kingdom of Asturias Emirate of Córdoba Carolingian Empire Kingdom of Italy	Swedes and Danes Vikings	Defeat: Vikings, under Björn Ironside, capture and ransom King García Íñiguez of Pamplona
Battle of the Morcuera (865): Part of the Reconquista; Location: Iberian Peninsula	Kingdom of Asturias	Emirate of Córdoba	Defeat
Umar ibn Hafsun's Rebellion (878–928) Location: Iberian Peninsula	Lordship of Bobastro: Muladí; Mozarabs; Berbers	Emirate of Córdoba: Arabs; Maulas	Defeat
Battle of Polvoraria (878): Part of the Reconquista; Location: Iberian Peninsula	Kingdom of Asturias	Emirate of Córdoba	Asturian victory
First Battle of Cellorigo (882): Part of the Reconquista; Location: Iberian Peninsula	Kingdom of Asturias	Emirate of Córdoba	Asturian victory
Second Battle of Cellorigo (883): Part of the Reconquista; Location: Iberian Peninsula	Kingdom of Asturias	Emirate of Córdoba	Asturian victory
Raid of 897 against Barcelona (897): Part of the Reconquista; Location: Iberian Peninsula	Kingdom of West Francia: County of Barcelona	Emirate of Córdoba: Banu Qasi	Defeat
Day of Zamora (901): Part of the Reconquista; Location: Iberian Peninsula	Kingdom of Asturias	Emirate of Córdoba	Asturian victory
Muslim conquest of Majorca (902/903–910/911) Location: Balearic Islands	Byzantine Majorca	Emirate of Córdoba	Defeat: Iṣām al-Ḫawlānī conquers the islands
Battle of San Esteban de Gormaz (917): Part of the Reconquista; Location: Iberian Peninsula	Kingdom of León	Emirate of Córdoba	Leonese victory
Pamplona Campaign (924): Part of the Reconquista; Location: Iberian Peninsula	Kingdom of Pamplona	Emirate of Córdoba	Defeat
Battle of Alhandic (939): Part of the Reconquista; Location: Iberian Peninsula	Kingdom of León	Caliphate of Córdoba	Defeat
Battle of Simancas (939): Part of the Reconquista; Location: Iberian Peninsula	Kingdom of León; County of Castile	Caliphate of Córdoba	Leonese victory
Hungarian raid in Spain (942): Part of the Hungarian invasions of Europe; Location: Iberian Peninsula and Southern Europe	Caliphate of Córdoba: Upper March of Al-Andalus; Catalan Counties	Principality of Hungary: Magyar tribes	Initial Hungarian victory. Lacking food stores and finding insufficient forage, the Hungarians retired after a few days
Battle of Aguioncha (966) Location: Iberian Peninsula	Kingdom of Galicia	County of Portugal	Defeat Culmination of a Galician–Portuguese civil war in the Kingdom of León
Sack of Santiago de Compostela (968): Part of Viking raids on Iberian Peninsula and Viking expansion; Location: Iberian Peninsula	Kingdom of Galicia	Norwegian Vikings	Defeat
Battle of Rueda (981): Part of the Reconquista; Location: Iberian Peninsula	Kingdom of León; County of Castile; Kingdom of Pamplona	Caliphate of Córdoba	Defeat
Sack of Barcelona (985): Battle of Rovirans; Part of the Reconquista; Location: Iberian Peninsula	County of Barcelona	Caliphate of Córdoba	Defeat
Battle of Cervera (1000): Part of the Reconquista; Location: Iberian Peninsula	Kingdom of León; County of Castile; Kingdom of Pamplona	Caliphate of Córdoba	Defeat
Battle of Calatañazor (1002): Part of the Reconquista; Location: Iberian Peninsula	Kingdom of León; County of Castile; Kingdom of Pamplona	Caliphate of Córdoba	Christian victory
Battle of Albesa (1003): Part of the Reconquista; Location: Iberian Peninsula	Catalan Counties	Caliphate of Córdoba	Cordoban victory: Death of Berenguer of Elna
Razzia of 1003 (1003): Part of the Reconquista; Location: Iberian Peninsula	Catalan Counties	Caliphate of Córdoba	Cordoban victory: Capture of Ermengol I, Count of Urgell
Mujahid's invasion of Sardinia (1005–1015): Part of Saracens incursions on Italy; Location: Sardinia	Taifa of Dénia	Republic of Pisa Republic of Genoa Sardinian medieval kingdoms: Judicate of Logudoro; Judicate of Cagliari	Defeat
Fitna of al-Andalus (1009–1031) Location: Iberian Peninsula	Muslim rebels	Caliphate of Córdoba	The caliphate crumbled in 1031 into a number of independent taifas, including the Taifa of Córdoba, Taifa of Seville and Taifa of Zaragoza
Normand expedition of 1014: Part of Viking raids on Iberian Peninsula; Location: Iberian Peninsula	Kingdom of León: Kingdom of Galicia; County of Portugal	Norwegian Vikings	Defeat
Castilian-Leonese War (1034–1037): Battle of Tamarón; Location: Iberian Peninsula	County of Castile Kingdom of Pamplona	Kingdom of León	Castilian victory: Death of Bermudo III of León; Then Ferdinand I of León is crowned as King of Leon, dominating all the Iberian Peninsula and considering himself as Imperator totius Hispaniae. Afterward, his Curia regis elevates Castille from County to Kingdom in 1065
Battle of Tafalla (1035/1043)Location: Iberian Peninsula	Kingdom of Pamplona	County of Aragon Taifa of Zaragoza	Pamplonese victory
Battle of Atapuerca (1054)Location: Iberian Peninsula	Kingdom of León: County of Castile	Kingdom of Pamplona	Leonese-Castilian victory
Battle of Graus (1063): Part of the Reconquista; Location: Iberian Peninsula	County of Castile; Taifa of Zaragoza	Kingdom of Aragon	Castilian–Zaragozan victory
Crusade of Barbastro (1064): Part of the Reconquista; Location: Iberian Peninsula	Kingdom of Aragon; County of Urgell; Duchy of Aquitaine; Papal States	Emirate of Lārida	Christian victory
Battle of Paterna (1065): Part of the Reconquista; Location: Iberian Peninsula	Kingdom of León	Taifa of Valencia	Leonese victory
War of the Three Sanchos (1065–67) Location: Iberian Peninsula	Kingdom of Castile	Kingdom of Navarre; Kingdom of Aragon	Castilian victory: Castile annexes La Bureba, Montes de Oca and Pancorbo
Castilian-Leonese War of 1068: Battle of Llantada (1068); Location: Iberian Peninsula	Kingdom of Castile	Kingdom of León	Castilian victory
Battle of Pedroso (1071) Location: Iberian Peninsula	Kingdom of Galicia	County of Portugal	Victory García II of Galicia declaring himself King of Portugal
Castilian-Leonese War of 1072: Battle of Golpejera (1072); Part of the Reconquista; Location: Iberian Peninsula	Kingdom of Castile	Kingdom of León	Castilian victory
Battle of Almenar (1082): Part of the Reconquista and Lérida-Zaragoza conflictLocation: Iberian Peninsula	Catalan counties Muslim Taifa of Lérida	Muslim Zaragoza	Defeat
Battle of Piedra Pisada (1084): Part of the Reconquista; Location: Iberian Peninsula	Christian Aragon	Muslim Zaragoza	Defeat
Battle of Morella (1084): Part of the Reconquista and Lérida-Zaragoza conflictLocation: Iberian Peninsula	Kingdom of Navarre; Kingdom of Aragon Muslim Taifa of Lérida	Muslim Zaragoza	Victory
Siege of Toledo (1084–85): Part of the Reconquista; Location: Iberian Peninsula	Kingdom of Castile	Taifa of Toledo	Castilian victory
Battle of Sagrajas (1086): Part of the Reconquista; Location: Iberian Peninsula	Kingdom of Castile; Kingdom of León; Kingdom of Aragon	Almoravids: Taifa of Seville; Taifa of Badajoz; Taifa of Granada; Taifa of Almería; Taifa of Málaga	Defeat: Start of Almoravid conquest of Al-Andalus
Siege of Toledo (1090): Part of the Reconquista; Location: Iberian Peninsula	Kingdom of Castile	Almoravids	Castilian victory
Siege of Valencia (1092–1094): Part of the Reconquista; Location: Iberian Peninsula	Kingdom of Castile	Taifa of Valencia; Almoravids	Castilian victory. El Cid gets the Lordship of Valencia
Battle of Cuarte (1094): Part of the Reconquista; Location: Iberian Peninsula	Valencia under Cid's rule	Almoravids	Castilian victory.
Siege of Huesca (1094–1096): Part of the Reconquista; Location: Iberian Peninsula	Kingdom of Aragon	Taifa of Zaragoza Kingdom of Castile	Aragonese victory. Start of Aragonese expansion to the south of the Pyrenees
First Crusade (1095–1099): Part of Crusades; Location: Middle East (Levant and Anatolia)	Crusaders: Kingdom of France; Byzantine Empire; Armenian Cilicia; County of Flanders; Papal States; Republic of Genoa; Holy Roman Empire; County of Sicily; Duchy of Apulia and Calabria; County of Barcelona; County of Roussillon; Maronites	Muslims: Seljuk Empire; Abbasid Caliphate; Fatimid Caliphate	Victory: The Crusade assists in capturing Nicaea, restoring much of western Anatolia to the Byzantine Empire; The Crusaders capture Jerusalem and establish the Crusader states
Battle of Alcoraz (1096): Part of the Reconquista; Location: Iberian Peninsula	Kingdom of Aragon	Taifa of Zaragoza Kingdom of Castile	Aragonese victory
Battle of Bairén (1097): Part of the Reconquista; Location: Iberian Peninsula	Kingdom of Aragon; Valencia under Cid's rule Kingdom of Castile	Almoravid dynasty	Aragonese/Castilian/Valencian victory
Battle of Consuegra (1097): Part of the Reconquista; Location: Iberian Peninsula	Kingdom of Castile; Kingdom of León	Almoravid dynasty	Defeat
Battle of Mollerussa (1102): Part of the Reconquista; Location: Iberian Peninsula	County of Urgell	Almoravid dynasty	Stalemate Death of Ermengol V, Count of Urgell and end of Moroccan expansion
Conquest of Balaguer (1105): Part of the Reconquista; Location: Iberian Peninsula	County of Barcelona County of Urgell	Almoravid dynasty	Christian victory
Norwegian Crusade (1107–1110): Part of the Crusades (aftermath of First Crusade) and the Reconquista; Location: Iberia, Balearic Islands, Palestine	Kingdom of Jerusalem (Norway) Norwegian Realm; Republic of Venice	Fatimid Caliphate Almoravid Empire Taifa of Badajoz Taifa of Majorca Barbary pirates of Majorca	Crusader victory.
Battle of Uclés (1108): Part of the Reconquista; Location: Iberian Peninsula	Kingdom of Castile; Kingdom of León	Almoravid dynasty	Defeat
Galician Revolt (1110–1112)Location: Iberian Peninsula	Kingdom of Castile and León: Kingdom of Galicia; Kingdom of Aragon and Navarre	Galician Rebels County of Portugal Duchy of Burgundy	Inconclusive: Galician rebels and Castilian loyals ally against Aragonese influence
Leonese Civil War (1110–1111): Battle of Candespina; Battle of Viadangos; Location: Iberian Peninsula	Supporters of Urraca of León and Castile: Kingdom of Castile; Kingdom of León; Kingdom of Galicia	Supporters of Alfonso the Battler: Kingdom of Navarre; Kingdom of Aragon; Galician Rebels County of Portugal Duchy of Burgundy	Truce: Military victory of Alfonso; Political victory of Urraca
1113–1115 Balearic Islands expedition: Part of the Crusades; Location: Mediterranean Sea (Balearic Islands)	Republic of Pisa; Catalan counties County of Provence; Giudicato of Torres; Papal States	Taifa of Majorca; Almoravids	Christian victory
Almoravid expedition to Catalonia (1114): Battle of Martorell (1114); Part of the Reconquista; Location: Iberian Peninsula	County of Barcelona; County of Urgell; County of Cerdaña	Almoravid dynasty	Catalan victory
Conquest of Zaragoza (1118): Part of the Reconquista; Location: Zaragoza	Kingdom of Aragon; Kingdom of Navarre; Viscounty of Béarn	Almoravid dynasty	Christian victory
Battle of Cutanda (1120): Part of the Reconquista; Location: Iberian Peninsula	Kingdom of Aragon; Duchy of Aquitaine	Almoravid dynasty	Christian victory
Battle of Lerida (1122): Part of the Reconquista; Location: Iberian Peninsula	Kingdom of Aragon	Almoravid dynasty County of Barcelona Duchy of Aquitaine	Almoravid victory
Crusade of Alfonso I of Aragon in Andalusia: Part of the Reconquista; (1125–1126); Location: Iberian Peninsula	Kingdom of Aragon Mozarabs	Almoravid dynasty	Christian Tactic Victory: Almoravid punish Mozarabs through the Expulsion of Andalusi Christians in 1126.
Battle of Corbins (1126): Part of the Reconquista; Location: Iberian Peninsula	County of Barcelona County of Pallars Jussà	Almoravid dynasty	Almoravid victory
Battle of São Mamede (1128): Part of Kingdom of León Civil War and War of Portuguese Independence; Location: Iberian Peninsula	Kingdom of León Kingdom of Galicia	County of Portugal	Defeat; Secession of the County of Portugal which becomes a kingdom with Afonso Henriques
Luso–Leonese War (1130–37) Location: Iberian Peninsula	Kingdom of León	County of Portugal	Leonese victory: Treaty of Tuy
Aragonese intervention in Aquitaine (1130–1133): Siege of Bayonne (1130–1131); Location: Southern France	Union of Aragon-Navarre Viscounty of Béarn County of Bigorre County of Foix County of Comminges	Duchy of Aquitaine County of Toulouse County of Labourd	Defeat
War of Navarrese-Aragonese succession (1134–46): Invasion of Alfonso VII of Castile (1134); Invasion of García Ramírez of Navarre (1141); Location: Iberian Peninsula	1° phase (1134–1135) Loyals to García Ramírez of Navarre: Kingdom of Navarre; Union of Castile-León 2° phase (1135) Union of Castile-León 3° phase (1135–1136) Union of Castile-León: Kingdom of Navarre; 4° phase (1136–1140) Union of Castile-León-Aragon 5° phase (1139–1149) Union of Castile-León Union of Aragon-Barcelona 6° phase (1139–1146) Union of Castile-León: Kingdom of Navarre	1° phase (1134–1135) Loyals to Ramiro II of Aragon: Kingdom of Aragon; 2° phase (1135) Union of Aragon-Navarre 3° phase (1135–1136) Kingdom of Aragon 4° phase (1136–1140) Kingdom of Aragon County of Barcelona Kingdom of Navarre County of Portugal (since 1137) 5° phase (1139–40) Kingdom of Navarre 6° phase (1139–1146) Union of Aragon-Barcelona	1° Phase: Pact of Vadoluengo: Navarre-Aragon union is maintained, with Navarre loyal to García Ramirez as vassals to Aragon loyal to Ramiro II, joining forces against Castilan invasion (which conquered Kingdom of Zaragoza) 2° Phase: García of Navarre declared himself a vassal of Alfonso VII of Castile and León, so supporting Alfonso's claims to Aragon crown 3° Phase: Alfonso VII and Ramiro II consolidates an alliance in the Treaty of Alagon (during the short time that all iberian kingdoms were vassals of Castile, Alfonso VII declared himself Imperator totius Hispaniae). However, Garcia of Navarre rebels against Castile, while also in war with Aragon 4° phase: Aragonese nobility rejects alliance with Castille, so pacts an alliance with Catalan County of Barcelona on the Capitulations of Barbastre, donating Ramiro II his realm to Ramon Berenguer IV of Barcelona. Aragonese-Castilian conflict ends with the Treaty of Carrion (ending the conflict of succession in Aragon). 5° phase: After a failed attempt of partitioning Navarre between Castile and Aragon, Castilian-Navarrese conflict ends with the Peace of Calahorra (ending Conflict of succession in Navarra) 6° phase: The Aragonese–Navarrese conflicts continues until 1146 with the Truce of San Esteban de Gormaz, in which Castile quits of the war
Siege of Oreja (1139): Part of the Reconquista; Location: Iberian Peninsula	Kingdom of Castile; Kingdom of Galicia; Kingdom of León; Kingdom of Toledo (Christians)	Almoravids (Muslims)	Christian victory
Battle of Cerneja (1139): Part of War of Portuguese independence; Location: Iberian Peninsula	Kingdom of León	County of Portugal	Defeat
Battle of Valdevez (1140): Part of War of Portuguese independence; Location: Iberian Peninsula	Kingdom of León	County of Portugal	Defeat The Treaty of Zamora (1143) recognized Portuguese independence from the Kingdom of León
Baussenque Wars (1144–62) Location: Burgundy, Kingdom of Arles (Modern France)	County of Barcelona; County of Provence, Viscount of Albi and Carcassonne	County of Toulouse County of Foix Lords of Baux	Victory for Catalan party
Revolt against Almoravids (1144–47); Location: Iberian Peninsula (Sharq al-Andalus): Siege of Mértola; Siege of Orihuela; Battle of Almosala; Battle of Albacete	Almoravid dynasty Taifa of Cuenca; Kingdom of Castile	Taifa of Valencia Taifa of Murcia Taifa of Rueda de Jalón	Stalemate
Second Crusade (1147–50): Siege of Almería; Siege of Lisbon; Part of Crusades; Location: Middle East and North Africa (Near East, Anatolia, Levant, Egypt) and Iberian Peninsula| Crusaders: Kingdom of Jerusalem; Kingdom of France; Holy Roman Empire; Kingdom of Portugal; Kingdom of Castile; County of Barcelona; Kingdom of León; Byzantine Empire; Kingdom of England	Seljuk Empire; Emirate of Zengids; Abbasid Caliphate; Fatimid Caliphate; Almoravids	Status quo ante bellum: Decisive Seljuk Turks victory in Anatolia; Decisive Crusader victories in Iberia	
Siege of Almería (1147): Part of Crusades and Reconquista; Location: Iberian Peninsula	Union of Castile-León Union of Aragon-Barcelona; Kingdom of Navarre Republic of Genoa	Almoravids (Muslims)	Christian victory
Siege of Lisbon (1147): Part of Crusades and Reconquista; Location: Iberian Peninsula	Taifa of Badajoz	Kingdom of Portugal Crusaders	Christian victory
Navarrese-Aragonese War (1148–1156): García Ramirez Offensive (1148); Raymond Berenguer Offensive (1151); Sancho Garcia Offensive (1156)	Union of Aragon-Barcelona Union of Castile-León-Galicia (since 1151)	Union of Castile-León-Galicia (until 1150) Kingdom of Navarre	Stalemate: Treaty of Tudilén and Treaty of Lleida: Castile and Aragon makes peace and agrees an alliance, while also establishing spheres of influence for a planned partition of Navarre and Al-Andalus; Peace of Gallur: Aragon and Navarre agree on a definitive peace between both kingdoms, after being formally at war since 1134
Conquest of Siurana (1158–1159)Location: Iberian Peninsula	Kingdom of Aragon	Taifa of Siurana	Aragonese victory
Conflict over the regency of Alfonso VIII (1158–1169): Battle of Lobregal; Battle of Huete; Location: Iberian Peninsula	House of Lara Kingdom of Castile	House of Castro Supported by: Kingdom of León; Kingdom of Galicia; Kingdom of Aragon (since 1162); Kingdom of Navarre (since 1162)	Victory for House of Castro.; Start of Castilian-Leonese War, Castilian-Navarrese War and Castilian-Aragonese war
Henry II of England campaign on Toulouse (1159): Part of Capetian–Plantagenet rivalry; Location: Southern France	Kingdom of England (Angevin) House of Aragon: County of Barcelona; Lordship of Montpellier	(Kingdom of France) Royal Domain of France (Capet) County of Toulouse	Truce: Political victory of the Anglo-Normans
Castilian-Leonese War (1162–1166) Location: Iberian Peninsula	Kingdom of Castile Kingdom of Portugal	Kingdom of León Kingdom of Navarre	Castilian Victory: Castilians regains Toledo
Luso–Leonese War (1162–1165) Location: Iberian Peninsula	Kingdom of León	Kingdom of Portugal	Portuguese victory
Luso–Leonese War (1167–1169): Siege of Badajoz (1169); Location: Iberian Peninsula	Kingdom of León Almohad Caliphate	Kingdom of Portugal	Leonese-Almohad Victory
Aragon-Toulouse War over Provence (1166–1176) Location: Southern France	Crown of Aragon: County of Barcelona; County of Provence; Lordship of Montpellier; Viscounty of Béarn (since 1170); County of Bigorre (since 1175); House of Baux House of Trencavel (until 1171) Kingdom of England (Angevin) (until 1173) Republic of Genoa (until 1167)	County of Toulouse House of Trencavel (since 1771) Republic of Genoa (since 1168)	Aragonese victory: Treaty of Amparazan: The Aran Valley, which since the 10th century belonged to the county of Cominges, is subjugated by Aragon; Treaty of Tarascon: Ramon V of Toulouse renounced his claims to Provence, the County of Gévaudan and Carladès, in favour of Alfonso II of Aragon
Almohad wars in the Iberian Peninsula: Siege of Huete; Conquest of Cuenca; Raid of Ceuta (1180); Battle of Ceuta (1182); Siege of Moya; Siege of Santarém (1184); Battle of Alarcos; Siege of Al-Dāmūs; Battle of Las Navas de Tolosa; Part of the Reconquista; Location: Iberian Peninsula	Kingdom of Castile: Order of Santiago; Order of Calatrava; Crown of Aragon: Knights Templar; Kingdom of Navarre (until 1195) (1211–1212); Kingdom of León (until 1195) (1211–1212); Kingdom of Portugal; Crusaders from Northern Europe	Almohad Caliphate; Kingdom of Navarre (1196–1197); Kingdom of León (1196–1197)	Spanish Christian victory: Decline of the Almohad Caliphate; Castilian conquest of central Spain; Third Period of Taifas
Siege of Huete (1172): Part of the Reconquista and Almohad wars in the Iberian Peninsula; Location: Iberian Peninsula	Kingdom of Castile	Almohad Caliphate	Castilian Victory
Conquest of Cuenca (1177): Part of the Reconquista and Almohad wars in the Iberian Peninsula; Location: Iberian Peninsula	Kingdom of Castile Kingdom of León Kingdom of Aragon: Lordship of Albarracín	Almohad Caliphate	Castilian victory
Castilian-Leonese War (1178–1180) Location: Iberian Peninsula	Kingdom of Castile Kingdom of Portugal	Kingdom of León	Inconclusive: Conference of Tordesillas
Aragon-Toulouse War of 1179-1185 Location: Southern France	Crown of Aragon: County of Barcelona; County of Provence; Lordship of Montpellier; Viscounty of Béarn; County of Bigorre; Viscounty of Narbonne Republic of Pisa (since 1183) Cathars	County of Toulouse Kingdom of England (Angevin) County of Forcalquier (since 1183) Republic of Genoa (since 1183) County of Provence (1183-1184)	Aragonese victory
Siege of Moya (1183): Part of the Reconquista and Almohad wars in the Iberian Peninsula; Location: Iberian Peninsula	Kingdom of Castile	Almohad Caliphate	Castilian victory
Siege of Santarém (1184): Part of the Reconquista and Almohad wars in the Iberian Peninsula; Location: Iberian Peninsula	Kingdom of Portugal Kingdom of León	Almohad Caliphate	Victory: Pope Alexander III formally recognized Afonso I as rex Portugalensium
Castilian-Leonese War of 1188-1194 Location: Iberian Peninsula	Kingdom of Castile	League of Huesca: Kingdom of León; Kingdom of Portugal (since 1191); Kingdom of Aragon (1191–1192); Kingdom of Navarre (since 1191)	Inconclusive: Castilian military victory until Papal mediation cease the conflict in a mission to unify all Iberian Christian Kingdoms against Almohads; Treaty of Tordehumos: Leonese political victory
Third Crusade (1189–92): Part of Crusades; Location: Middle East (Levant and Anatolia), Mediterranean Europe (Sicily, Iberia, Balkans)	Kingdom of France; Holy Roman Empire Kingdom of Hungary Republic of Genoa Kingdom of Portugal Kingdom of Navarre; Kingdom of León Republic of Pisa Kingdom of Denmark; Angevin Empire Kingdom of Jerusalem Armenian Cilicia	Sunni Muslim: Ayyubid Sultanate; Seljuk Sultanate of Rûm; Almohad Caliphate; Shia Muslim: Nizari Ismaili state(the Assassins); Eastern Christian opponents: Byzantine Empire; Cyprus	Treaty of Jaffa (1192): Crusader military victory.; Recognition of the territorial status quo at the end of active campaigning, including continued Muslim control of Jerusalem and the restoration of the Levantine Crusader States.; Crusaders capture Cyprus and the Kingdom of Cyprus is established; Conquest of Alvor and siege of Silves by Portuguese on Iberian Peninsula
Castilian-Aragonese War of 1190-1191 Location: Iberian Peninsula	Kingdom of Castile	Borja Alliance: Kingdom of Aragon; Kingdom of Navarre; Kingdom of Portugal (since 1191) Kingdom of León (since 1191)	Stalemate
Battle of Alarcos (1195): Part of the Reconquista and Almohad wars in the Iberian Peninsula; Location: Iberian Peninsula	Kingdom of Castile; Order of Santiago; Order of Évora	Almohad Caliphate	Defeat
Castilian–Leonese War (1196–1197): Part of Almohad wars in the Iberian Peninsula Location: Iberian Peninsula	Kingdom of Castile Kingdom of Aragon	Kingdom of León Kingdom of Navarre; Almohad Caliphate	Ceasefire: Castilian military victory until Papal mediation cease the conflict and condemns both parties due to disapprove the marriage between Berengaria of Castile and Alfonso IX of León (which attempted to make a peace on Status quo ante bellum)
Luso-Leonese War (1196–1200) Location: Iberian Peninsula	Kingdom of Portugal Kingdom of Castile (until 1197)	Kingdom of León Kingdom of Navarre; Almohad Caliphate	Status Quo Ante Bellum
Castilian invasion of Navarre (1199–1200) Location: Pyrenees	Kingdom of Castile	Kingdom of Navarre	Victory: Navarre ends as a Landlocked country, lossing Durangaldea, Álava, Aitzorrotz (Deba valley), Gipuzkoa and Donostia Hernaniko
Almohad conquest of Balearic islands (1203): part of Almohad-almoravid conflicts; Location: Balearic Islands and North Africa	Almoravid dynasty: Taifa of Majorca	Almohad Caliphate	Almohad victory
Castilian-Leonese War of 1204–1206 Location: Iberian Peninsula	Kingdom of Castile	Kingdom of León	Stalemate: Treaty of Cabreros between Alfonso VIII of Castile and Alfonso IX of León.; Treaty of Valladolid of 1209 between both kingdoms.
Anglo-Castilian War (1205–1208) Location: Southern France, Gascony	Kingdom of Castile Viscounty of Béarn County of Armagnac Vizcounty of Tartas Orthez	Kingdom of England (Angevin)	English victory: Alfonso VIII of Castile's coalition fails to conquer the Duchy of Gascony or the Duchy of Aquitaine, loyal to John of England.
Albigensian Crusade (1209–1229): Part of Crusades; Location: Southern France (Languedoc and Occitania)	Cathars Churches Faidit: County of Toulouse; Viscounty of Béziers and Albi; County of Valentinois; Lordship of Séverac; Marquisate of Provence; Viscounty of Béarn; County of Astarac; Crown of Aragon; County of Foix; County of Comminges; Viscounty of Carcassonne; Lordship of Menèrba; Lordship of Tèrmes; Lordship of Cabaret; Lordship of Montsegúr; Kingdom of England	Crusaders: Catholic Church: Crusader volunteers; Episcopal Inquisition; Dominican Order; Militia of the Faith of Jesus Christ; Hospitallers of the Holy Spirit; Knights of Saint George; Papal States; Kingdom of France: Duchy of Burgundy; Duchy of Brittany; County of Nevers; County of Auxerre; County of Saint-Pol; Viscounty of Donges; Viscounty of Torèna; English volunteers; County of Aurenja: County of Provence-Forcalquier; Duchy of Austria: Duchy of Berg; Electorate of Cologne	Defeat: Languedoc, which until then was still under the influence of Catalonia and the Aragonese, definitively entered in French hands and they were incorporated into their sphere of influence as conquered Royal Domains.; The crusade leads to the definitive separation between the Occitans, to the north, and the Catalans, to the south.; Extinction of Catharism and instauration of Holy Inquisition to France and all Catholic Christendom.; House of Barcelona renounced its claims over Occitania and Provence on the Treaty of Corbeil of 1258, and also French royal family renounce claims over the Spanish March.
Siege of Al-Dāmūs (1210): Part of the Reconquista and Almohad wars in the Iberian Peninsula; Location: Iberian Peninsula	Crown of Aragon; Knights Hospitaller; Knights Templar	Almohad Caliphate	Christian victory
Castilian-Leonese War of 1212 Location: Iberian Peninsula	Kingdom of Castile	Kingdom of León Kingdom of Portugal	Truce of Coimbra
Battle of Las Navas de Tolosa (1212): Part of the Reconquista and Almohad wars in the Iberian Peninsula; Location: Iberian Peninsula	Kingdom of Castile; Crown of Aragon; Kingdom of Portugal; Kingdom of Navarre; Order of Santiago; Order of Calatrava; Knights Templar (Kingdom of France) French volunteers Leonese volunteers	Almohad Caliphate	Christian victory: 100,000 Muslims killed; 25–30 Christians killed
Battle of Muret (1213): Part of the Albigensian Crusade; Location: Muret (Modern France)	Crown of Aragon; County of Toulouse; County of Comminges; County of Foix; Viscounty of Carcassonne	Crusaders; Kingdom of France	French-Crusader victory
Castilian-Leonese War of 1217-1218 Location: Iberian Peninsula	Kingdom of Castile	Kingdom of León	Unnamed truce between Alfonso IX of León, and Fernando III with Queen Berenguela of Castile.
First Nobiliary Revolt against James I of Aragon (1220) Location:[Iberian Peninsula	Crown of Aragon: Royal Council of Aragon; James I of Aragon forces	Lordship of Albarracín Rodrigo de Liçana forces Pero Ferrández de Açagra forces	Victory
Second Nobiliary Revolt against James I of Aragon (1223) Location: Iberian Peninsula	Crown of Aragon: Royal Council of Aragon; James I of Aragon forces	Nobiliary leagues Ferdinand of Aragon forces	Defeat
Conquest of Valencia (1225–1304): Part of the Reconquista; Location: Iberian Peninsula	Crown of Aragon: Principality of Catalonia; Kingdom of Aragon; Lordship of Montpellier	Almohad Caliphate Taifa of Valencia Taifa of Murcia Emirate of Granada Crown of Castile	Victory: Foundation of Kingdom of Valencia.
Conquest of Majorca (1228–31): Siege of Artà; Part of the Reconquista; Location: Mediterranean Sea (Balearic Islands)	Crown of Aragon; Marseille; Narbonne; Republic of Genoa; Knights Templar; Order of Malta	Almohad Caliphate territory of Majorca	Aragonese victory
Siege of Burriana (1233): Part of the Reconquista; Location: Iberian Peninsula	Crown of Aragon; Knights Hospitaller; Knights Templar; Senyoria d'Albarrasí	Taifa of Valencia	Aragonese victory
Conquest of Ibiza (1235): Part of the Reconquista; Location: Mediterranean Sea (Balearic Islands)	Crown of Aragon Kingdom of Portugal	Almohad Caliphate	Aragonese victory: Territorial division in quartó
Siege of Córdoba (1236): Part of the Reconquista; Location: Iberian Peninsula	Kingdom of Castile	Moors	Castilian victory
Battle of the Puig (1237): Part of the Reconquista; Location: Iberian Peninsula	Crown of Aragon	Taifa of Valencia	Aragonese victory: Conquest of Valencia
Barons' Crusade (1239–1241): Part of the Crusades; Location: Levant	Kingdom of France Kingdom of England Kingdom of Navarre; Kingdom of Jerusalem	Ayyubids	Crusader diplomatic victory
Castilian conquest of Murcia (1243–1245): Part of the Reconquista; Location: Iberian Peninsula	Crown of Castile Taifa of Murcia	Muslim Murcians: Lorca; Mula; Cartagena	Castilian victory: Treaty of Alcaraz (1243) is seizured and Murcia is a protectorate of Ferdinand III of Castile.; Treaty of Almizra with Aragon to establish spheres of influence on Emirate of Granada.
Anglo-Navarrese Conflicts (1237–1266): 1st Anglo-Navarrese war (1243–1244); 2nd Anglo-Navarrese war (1266); Part of Capetian–Plantagenet rivalry; Location: Southern France, Gascony	Kingdom of Navarre Kingdom of France	Kingdom of England (Angevin) Vizcounty of Tartas	English victory: [1°] Peace of Ainhoa: Henry III of England seized control of the Duchy of Gascony, and Theobald I of Navarre received compensation for the loss of his Fiefs in the Kingdom of France.; [2°]: Theobald II of Navarre renounced its claims over Bigorre.; End of Navarrese influence over the French territories south of the Garonne.
Great Interregnum 1245/50–1273/5 Location: Germany and Italy	Hohenstaufen party: Frederick II (1245–50); Conrad IV (1245–54); Alfonso X of Castile (1257–75); Rudolf of Habsburg (1273–5)	Welf party: Henry of Thuringia (1246–7); William II of Holland (1247–56); Richard of Cornwall (1257–72); Ottokar II of Bohemia	Compromise: Unanimous election of Rudolf of Habsburg in 1273.; Alfonso X of Castile renounced its imperial claim in 1275.
Siege of Jaén (1245–1246): Part of the Reconquista; Location: Iberian Peninsula	Kingdom of Castile; Order of Santiago	Taifa of Jayyān (جيان); Emirate of Granada	Castilian victory
Siege of Seville (1247–48): Part of the Reconquista; Location: Iberian Peninsula	Kingdom of Castile; Order of Santiago; Knights Templar; Knights Hospitaller; Order of Calatrava	Almohad Caliphate; Taifa of Niebla	Castilian victory
Seventh Crusade (1248–54) Location: North Africa (Egypt)	Kingdom of France Kingdom of Navarre; Kingdom of Jerusalem Knights Templar; Knights Hospitaller	Ayyubids Bahris	Defeat: Status quo ante bellum
Portuguese–Castilian war of 1250–1253 (1250–1253) Location: Iberian Peninsula	Kingdom of Castile	Kingdom of Portugal	Defeat: Portugal retains the Algarve.
Anglo-Castilian War of 1253–1256: Gaston VIII's Rebellion and Simon de Montfort's Rebellion; Location: Southern France, Gascony	Kingdom of Castile Viscounty of Béarn County of Armagnac County of Comminges	Kingdom of England (Angevin)	Status Quo Ante Bellum: Alfonso X of Castile and Henry III of England makes an arranged marriage between their sons and make an alliance.; Gaston VII of Béarn fails to expand its dominions.; End of Castilian influence on Gascony and renouncement of its claims over Eleanor of Castile's inheritance on southern France.
Mudéjar revolt (1264–1266): Conquest of Murcia; Part of the Reconquista and Mudejar revolts; Location: Iberian Peninsula	Kingdom of Castile Kingdom of Aragón: Kingdom of Valencia; Principality of Catalonia; Order of Calatrava Order of Santiago	Muslim (Mudéjar): Lower Andalusia; Taifa of Murcia; Emirate of Granada	Rebellion defeated.; Expulsion of Muslim populations.; Aragonese troops abolish Taifa of Murcia, and then give the territory to Castile, according to Treaty of Almizra.; Payment of tribute from Granada to Castile.; Crown of Castile granted a Fuero to Murcians, so Kingdom of Murcia is constituted.
Crusade of the Infants of Aragon (1269): Part of Mongol invasions of the Levant and Crusades; Location: Levant	Crown of Aragon Ilkhanate of the Mongol Empire; Kingdom of Jerusalem	Mamluk Sultanate	Defeat
Eighth Crusade (1270) Location: North Africa (Tunisia)	Kingdom of France Kingdom of Aragon Kingdom of Sicily Kingdom of Navarre County of Luxembourg Scottish volunteers	Mamluk Sultanate	Inconclusive due to Death of Louis IX of France: Withdrawal of Crusaders from Tunisia; Treaty of Tunis; Opening of trade with Tunis; start of Fall of Outremer
Battle of Écija (1275): Part of the Reconquista; Location: Iberian Peninsula	Kingdom of Castile	Marinid Sultanate; Emirate of Granada	Defeat
Navarreria War (1276) Location: Pyrenees	Kingdom of Castile Kingdom of Navarre	Kingdom of France Navarrese Bourgeoisie	Defeat: House of Capet get the control over Navarre until 1328.
Battle of Algeciras (1278): Part of the Reconquista; Location: Iberian Peninsula	Kingdom of Castile; Order of Santa María de España	Marinid Sultanate; Emirate of Granada	Defeat
Siege of Algeciras (1278–1279): Part of the Reconquista; Location: Iberian Peninsula	Kingdom of Castile; Order of Santa María de España	Marinid Sultanate; Emirate of Granada	Defeat
Battle of Moclín (1280): Part of the Reconquista; Location: Iberian Peninsula	Kingdom of Castile; Order of Santa María de España	Emirate of Granada	Defeat
War of the Sicilian Vespers (1282–1302): First War of Sicily (1282–1904); Second War of Sicily (1296–1302); Part of Aragonese Crusade and Guelphs and Ghibellines; Location: Southern Italy	1° Phase Crown of Aragon; Kingdom of Trinacria; Byzantine Empire Republic of Venice Hafsid dynasty (Tunis) Ghibellines 2° Phase Crown of Aragon Kingdom of Naples; Kingdom of France Papal States	1° Phase Angevin Kingdom of Naples; Kingdom of France Republic of Pisa; Kingdom of Majorca; Papal States Republic of Genoa Kingdom of Navarre Kingdom of Castile Guelphs 2° Phase Kingdom of Sicily	Aragonese victory: Peace of Caltabellotta: Division of the kingdom of Sicily into Aragonese Trinacria and Angevin Naples, Aragonese Crusade defeated
Aragonese expedition to Tunez (1282–86) Location: Mediterranean Sea and North Africa (Algeria and Tunisia)	Crown of Aragon: Kingdom of Sicily; Tunisian rebels (Abu-Bakr ibn al-Wazir forces)	Hafsid dynasty	Defeat: Abu Ishaq Ibrahim I repress the revolt and the Catalan fleet goes to Sicily.; However, Peter III of Aragon occupies Djerba.
War of the Castilian Succession (1282–1284) Location: Iberian Peninsula	Kingdom of Castile Crown of Aragon Kingdom of France Marinid Sultanate; Emirate of Granada	Spanish nobility Order of Santiago Order of Calatrava	Proclamation of Sancho IV of Castile as king. Alfonso de la Cerda continues the fight for his succession rights with the support of Aragon and France.
Battle of Malta (1283): Part of the War of the Sicilian Vespers; Location: Mediterranean Sea (Malta)	Crown of Aragon	Kingdom of Naples	Aragonese victory
Siege of Albarracín (1284): Part of the War of the Castilian Succession (1284–90); Location: Iberian Peninsula	Kingdom of Aragón	House of Lara; Lordship of Albarracín	Aragonese victory
Battle of the Gulf of Naples (1284): Part of the War of the Sicilian Vespers; Location: Italian Peninsula	Crown of Aragon	Kingdom of Naples	Aragonese victory
Aragonese Crusade (1284–85): Majorca Campaign; Perpignan revolt; Location: Iberian Peninsula	Crown of Aragon	Papal States; Kingdom of France; Kingdom of Navarre; Kingdom of Naples; Kingdom of Majorca; Lordship of Albarracín; Republic of Genoa	Aragonese victory
Battle of Les Formigues (1285): Part of the Aragonese Crusade; Location: Mediterranean Sea	Kingdom of Sicily; Crown of Aragon	France; Republic of Genoa	Aragonese victory
Battle of the Col de Panissars (1285): Part of the Aragonese Crusade; Location: Pyrenees	Crown of Aragon	Kingdom of France	Aragonese victory
Battle of the Counts (1287): Part of the War of the Sicilian Vespers; Location: Italian Peninsula	Crown of Aragon	Kingdom of Naples; Papal States	Aragonese victory
Conquest of Menorca (1287): Part of the Reconquista; Location: Mediterranean Sea (Balearic Islands)	Crown of Aragon	Almohad Caliphate	Aragonese victory
Castilian-Aragonese War of 1288-1291 Location: Iberian Peninsula	Kingdom of Castile	Crown of Aragon Castilian Rebels; Emirate of Granada	Aragonese victory: Treaty of Monteagudo
War of the Strait (1292–1350): Battle of Salé; Battle of Écija (1275); Siege of Algeciras (1278–1279); Battle of Moclín (1280); Conquest of Taifa; First siege of Gibraltar; Battle of Ceuta (1309); Siege of Algeciras (1309–1310); Second siege of Gibraltar; Battle of the Vega of Granada; Razia of 1330; Battle of Teba; Siege of Guardamar; Siege of Elche; Third siege of Gibraltar; Fourth siege of Gibraltar; Battle of Ceuta (1339); Battle of Getares; Battle of Río Salado; Battle of Estepona; Siege of Algeciras (1342–1344); Fifth siege of Gibraltar; Part of the Reconquista; Location: Mediterranean Sea (Strait of Gibraltar)	Crown of Aragon Kingdom of Castile Kingdom of Portugal Supported by: Kingdom of Navarre Kingdom of France Kingdom of England Republic of Genoa	Marinid Sultanate Emirate of Granada	Victory: End of Moroccan hegemony in the Strait of Gibraltar. No more offensive or expansion attempts against the Christian Kingdoms would be done by Marinids, being just at the defensive for the rest of the reconquista.
Gascon War (1294–1303): Gascon campaign (1294–1303); Part of Capetian–Plantagenet rivalry; Location: France (Gascony and Flanders)	Kingdom of France: Kingdom of Navarre	Kingdom of England	Treaty of Paris (1303): Aquitaine becomes a fief of France.
Battle of Iznalloz (1295): Part of the Reconquista; Location: Iberian Peninsula	Kingdom of Castile; Order of Calatrava	Emirate of Granada	Defeat
2nd conquest of Murcia (1296–1304) Location: Iberian Peninsula	Crown of Aragon	Kingdom of Murcia	Aragonese Victory
Luso-Castilian War (1295–1297) Location: Iberian Peninsula	Kingdom of Castile	Kingdom of Portugal: Leonese rebels of John of Castile; Crown of Aragon: Castilian rebels of Alfonso de la Cerda	Stalemate: Treaty of Alcañices; Portuguese conquest of Ribacoa and other Castilian cities near Alentejo.
Castilian Civil War (1296–1304) Location: Iberian Peninsula	Kingdom of Castile and León (Unionists)	Divisionists: Castilian rebels of Alfonso de la Cerda; Leonese rebels of John of Castile Supported by: Crown of Aragon Kingdom of Portugal (until 1297)	Unionist Victory: Ferdinand IV of Castile maintains the union of the Kingdom of León and the Kingdom of Castile
Castilian-Aragonese War of 1296-1304: Aragonese conquest of Murcia; Location: Iberian Peninsula	Kingdom of Castile	Crown of Aragon: Castilian rebels of Alfonso de la Cerda; Kingdom of Portugal (until 1297): Leonese rebels of John of Castile; Emirate of Granada	Aragonese military victory Castilian political victory: Treaty of Torrellas and Treaty of Elche; Alicante is conquered by Crown of Aragon, but Kingdom of Murcia is returned to the Crown of Castile.
Battle of Cape Orlando (1299): Part of the War of the Sicilian Vespers; Location: Italian Peninsula	Crown of Aragon	Kingdom of Sicily	Aragonese victory
Battle of Ponza (1300): Part of the War of the Sicilian Vespers; Location: Italian Peninsula	Crown of Aragon	Kingdom of Naples; Supported by: Republic of Genoa	Aragonese victory
Catalan campaign in Asia Minor (1303–19): Massacre over Genoese; Battle of the Cyzicus; Battle of Germe; De Flor's murder and Catalan revenge; Battle of Aulax; Battle of Tire; Battle of Cibistra; Siege of Magnesia; Adrianopolis Massacre; Battle of Galipolli; Battle of Apros; Siege of Adrianopolis; Battle of Halmyros; Part of Catalan campaigns in the East and Byzantine–Ottoman wars; Location: Asia Minor, Balkans and Mediterranean Sea (modern-day Turkey and Greece)	Catalan Company Byzantine Empire (until 1305)	Various Anatolian Turkish Beyliks Republic of Genoa: Pera colony; Byzantine Empire (after 1305) Duchy of Athens: Franks	Against Turks: Indecisive.; Against Genoese: Victory.; Against Byzantines: Victory: Catalans Almogavars conquers some Greek principalities, dominating Duchy of Athens until 1388.
Castilian-Granada War (1309–19): Siege of Ceuta; Siege of Algeciras (1309–10); First siege of Gibraltar; Part of the Reconquista; Location: Iberian Peninsula, North Africa and Strait of Gibraltar	Kingdom of Castile: Order of Santiago; Order of Calatrava; Crown of Aragon Marinid Sultanate	Emirate of Granada	Victory
Siege of Algeciras (1309–10): Part of the Reconquista; Location: Iberian Peninsula	Kingdom of Castile; Order of Santiago; Order of Calatrava	Emirate of Granada	Defeat
Hafsids internal conflicts (1311–1313)Location: North Africa (Tunisia, Libya and Algeria)	Hafsids of Béjaïa rebels led by Abu Yahya Abu Bakr II Hafsids of Tunis rebels led by Abd al-Wahid Zakariya ibn al-Lihyani: Tripolitanian tribes; Supported by: Crown of Aragon: Kingdom of Sicily	Hafsid dynasty led by Abu-l-Baqa Khalid An-Nasr (unificationists)	Victory: Abd al-Wahid Zakariya ibn al-Lihyani (Tunisian winner) and Abu Yahya Abu Bakr II (Bejaia winner) divides Hafsid Ifriqiya between themselves.
Second Siege of Gibraltar (1315): Part of the Reconquista and Battle of the Strait; Location: Iberian Peninsula and Mediterranean Sea	Kingdom of Castile	Emirate of Granada	Castilian victory
Catalan campaign on Achaea (1315–1316): Battle of Clarenza; Siege of Chalandritsa; Battle of Picotin; Battle of Manolada; Location: Southeast Europe (modern Greece)	Isabella of Sabran forces: Kingdom of Majorca	Matilda of Hainaut forces: Principality of Achaea; Burgundians	Defeat: Ferdinand of Majorca dies at battle
Shepherds' Crusade (1320) Location: Normandy (modern France)	Kingdom of France Crown of Aragon Civilians (especially Jews)	French peasant crusaders	Franco–Aragonese victory: Crusaders dispersed
Aragonese conquest of Sardinia (1323–26) Location: Mediterranean Sea, Sardinia	Crown of Aragon Kingdom of Majorca; Giudicato of Arborea	Republic of Pisa; Republic of Genoa: House of Doria; Sassari Republic	Aragonese victory: Conquest of Pisan Sardinia by the Crown of Aragon, annexation of Sassari and creation of the Kingdom of Sardinia
Siege of Villa di Chiesa (1323–24): Part of the Aragonese conquest of Sardinia; Location: Mediterranean Sea, Sardinia	Crown of Aragon; Giudicato of Arborea	Republic of Pisa	Aragonese victory
Battle of Lucocisterna (1324): Part of the Aragonese conquest of Sardinia; Location: Mediterranean Sea, Sardinia	Crown of Aragon	Republic of Pisa	Aragonese victory
War of Saint-Sardos (1324): Part of Capetian–Plantagenet rivalry; Location: Southern France, Aquitaine	Kingdom of France: Kingdom of Navarre	Kingdom of England	French victory
Battle of Teba (1330): Part of the Reconquista; Location: Iberian Peninsula	Kingdom of Castile	Emirate of Granada	Castilian victory
Aragonese–Genoese War (1330–36): Siege of Genoa (1331); Location: Western Mediterranean Sea	Crown of Aragon	Republic of Genoa Monaco	Status quo ante bellum
Battle of Velbazhd (1330): part of Bulgarian–Serbian wars; Location: Balkans	Kingdom of Serbia Supported by: Andronikos II Palaiologos (Byzantine Empire) and the Catalan Company	Bulgarian Empire Supported by: Wallachia Moldavia Andronikos III Palaiologos (Byzantine Empire)	Serbian Victory
Haffsid conquest of Djerba (1335) Location: North Africa	Crown of Aragon: Kingdom of Sicily	Hafsid dynasty	Defeat: Abu Yahya Abu Bakr II regains Djerba.
Luso-Castilian War (1336–39): Battle of Villanueva de Barcarrota (1336); Battle of Cape St. Vincent (1337); Location: Iberian Peninsula	Crown of Castile	Kingdom of Portugal	Castilian victory
Hundred Years' War (1337–1453): Edwardian Phase; Caroline Phase; Lancastrian Phase; Part of Crisis of the late Middle Ages; Location: Western Europe (France, the Low Countries, Great Britain and the Iberian Peninsula)	France Burgundian State (1337–1419 and 1435–53) Kingdom of Scotland Crown of Castile Republic of Genoa Kingdom of Bohemia Crown of Aragon Avignon Papacy (Note: Fought against England during Despenser's Crusade.)	Kingdom of England Burgundian State (1419–35) Kingdom of Portugal Kingdom of Navarre County of Flanders Hanseatic League Ghent Rebels (Note: Fought with England during the Caroline War.) Papal States (Note: Fought with England during Despenser's Crusade.)	French Victory
English Channel naval campaign (1338–39): Part of the Hundred Years' War; Location: English Channel	Kingdom of France; Genoese mercenaries Castilian mercenaries	Kingdom of England; County of Flanders	Indecisive
Battle of Río Salado (1340): Part of the Reconquista; Location: Iberian Peninsula	Crown of Castile; Kingdom of Portugal	Marinid Sultanate; Emirate of Granada	Portuguese-Castilian victory: 400,000 Muslims killed; 20 Christians killed
War of the Breton Succession (1341–65): Part of the Hundred Years' War; Location: Brittany (modern France)	House of Châtillon-Blois; Kingdom of France; Kingdom of Castile	House of Dreux-Montfort; Kingdom of England	Stalemate: Treaty of Guérande
Battle of Estepona (1342): Part of the Reconquista; Location: Iberian Peninsula	Crown of Aragon	Marinid Sultanate	Aragonese victory
Siege of Algeciras (1342–1344): Part of War of the Strait and the Reconquista; Location: Iberian Peninsula	Kingdom of Castile; Republic of Genoa; Kingdom of Aragon; Kingdom of Portugal; Kingdom of Navarre; European crusaders English forces under Henry, 3rd Earl of Lancaster	Marinid Sultanate; Emirate of Granada	Castilian victory
War of the Union (1347–1348): Valencia Revolt; Battle of Mislata; Battle of Epila; Location: Iberian Peninsula	Royalist Fraternity	Union of Aragon Union of Valencia	Royalist victory: Peter IV of Aragon maintain the union of the Kingdom of Valencia and the Kingdom of Aragon.; Privilegis de la Unió are reemplaced by the Fueros de Sobrarbe.
Battle of Llucmajor (1349) Location: Mediterranean Sea, Balearic Islands	Crown of Aragon	Kingdom of Majorca	Aragonese victory: Annexation of the Kingdom of Majorca; Development of the Juraments of the King of Aragon.
War of the Straits (1350–1355): Siege of Genoa; Part of Catalan campaigns in the East and Venetian–Genoese wars; Location: Southeast Europe (modern Greece and European Turkey)	Republic of Venice Crown of Aragon Military support: Byzantine Empire	Republic of Genoa Logistical support: Ottoman Beylik Aydinids	Indecisive
Battle of Winchelsea (1350): Part of the Hundred Years' War; Location: Southern England	Kingdom of Castile	Kingdom of England	Defeat
Sardinian–Aragonese war (1353–1420) Location: Mediterranean Sea (Sardinia)	Crown of Aragon	Judicate of Arborea House of Doria Republic of Genoa	Aragonese victory: Arborea is annexed to Aragon Sardinia.
Sardinian Revolt (1353–55): Part of War of the Straits and Sardinian–Aragonese war; Location: Sardinia	Republic of Venice; Crown of Aragon	Republic of Genoa; Judicate of Arborea	Victory: Sanluri Peace
Siege of Alghero (1354): Part of the Venetian–Genoese wars; Location: Mediterranean Sea, Sardinia	Republic of Venice; Crown of Aragon	Republic of Genoa	Aragonese victory: Occupation of Alghero
War of the Two Peters (1356–75): Part of the Hundred Years' War; Location: Iberian Peninsula	Crown of Castile; With the support of: Kingdom of England; Republic of Genoa; Kingdom of Portugal; Kingdom of Navarre; Kingdom of Granada	Crown of Aragon; With the support of: Henry of Trastámara; Kingdom of France	Indecisive: Overthrowing of Peter I of Castile
Great Jacquerie (1358): Part of the Hundred Years' War; Location: France	Kingdom of France With the support of: Kingdom of Navarre	Jacqueries With the support of: Kingdom of England	Victory of French aristocracy thanks to Charles II of Navarre's campaign.
Battle of Linuesa (1361): Part of the Reconquista; Location: Iberian Peninsula	Kingdom of Castile; Kingdom of Jaén; Order of Calatrava	Emirate of Granada	Castilian victory
Battle of Guadix (1362): Part of the Reconquista; Location: Iberian Peninsula	Kingdom of Castile; Kingdom of Jaén; Order of Calatrava	Emirate of Granada	Defeat
Castilian Civil War (1366–69): Part of Hundred Years' War; Location: Iberian Peninsula	Forces of Pedro of Castile; Kingdom of England; Kingdom of Navarre; Kingdom of Granada	Forces of Henry of Trastámara; Kingdom of France; Crown of Aragon	Victory for Henry of Trastámara
Siege of León (1368): Part of the Castilian Civil War; Location: Iberian Peninsula	Crown of Castile – Henry's side	Crown of Castile – Pedro's side	Victory for Henry of Trastámara
Battle of Montiel (1369): Part of the Castilian Civil War; Location: Iberian Peninsula	Castilians; Granada	Castilians; France	Franco-Castilian victory
Siege of Algeciras (1369): Part of the Reconquista; Location: Iberian Peninsula	Kingdom of Castile	Emirate of Granada	Defeat
First Fernandine War (1369–1370): Part of the Fernandine Wars; Location: Iberian Peninsula	Crown of Castile	Kingdom of Portugal Supported by: Crown of Aragon	Castilian victory
Battle of La Rochelle (1372): Part of the Hundred Years' War; Location: Modern France	Crown of Castile	Kingdom of England	Castilian victory
Second Fernandine War (1372–1373): Part of the Fernandine Wars; Location: Iberian Peninsula	Crown of Castile	Kingdom of Portugal	Castilian victory
Jaime IV of Majorca War (1374) Location: Iberian Peninsula	Crown of Aragon	Kingdom of Majorca	Aragonese victory
Castilian invasions of England (1374–1380): Castilian attack on Gravesend; part of Hundred Years' War; Location: Southern England	Crown of Castile Supported by Kingdom of France	Kingdom of England	Castilian victory
Siege of Bayonne (1374) (1374): part of Hundred Years' War; Location: Southern France	Crown of Castile	Kingdom of England	Defeat
War of the Bands (1375–1500): part of Medieval Crisis in Basque Country; Location: Iberian Peninsula	Oñacinos; Beaumonteces; Crown of Castile	Gamboínos; Agramonteses; Kingdom of Navarre	Stalemate: Expulsion of feudal lords by brotherhoods.; Emergence of the General Assembly of Gipuzkoa.; Strengthening of royal authority.; End of civil wars until Spanish conquest of Navarra.
Navarrese conquest of Albania (1376): part of Albanian-Anjou Conflict and Thopia expansionist Wars; Location: Adriatic Sea and Balkans (Modern Albania)	Duchy of Durazzo Kingdom of Navarre: Navarrese Company; Kingdom of France	Kingdom of Albania: Karl Thopia forces	Victory: Louis of Navarre reconquers Albania for his wife, Joanna, Duchess of Durazzo.
Castilian-Navarrese War of 1378: part of Hundred Years' WarLocation: Iberian Peninsula	Crown of Castile Kingdom of France	Kingdom of Navarre Kingdom of England	Castilian victory: Treaty of Briones and Treaty of Lizarra
Sicilian War (1378–1386): Siege of Palerm; Location: Mediterranean Sea (Southern Italy and Aegean Islands)	Aragonese Party	Sicilian Party	Victory: Revolt Suppressed and realization of a compromise with Italians.
Navarrese intervention in Greece (1378–1396): Part of Frankokratia; Location: Aegean Sea and Balkans (Modern Greece)	Navarrese Company Knights Hospitaller (until 1380): Hospitaller Rhodes; Acciaioli family (until 1382) Latin Empire (since 1382) Republic of Venice (since 1387)	Angevin Kingdom of Naples: Principality of Achaea (until 1381); Crown of Aragon (1379–1381): Duchy of Athens; Catalan Company; Duchy of Neopatras; Byzantine Empire (since 1382): Despotate of the Morea; Acciaioli family (1382–1389) Republic of Venice (1382–1387) Duchy of Savoy (since 1391) Ottoman Empire	Stalemate: Navarrese conquered much of Messenia and the towns of Androusa and Kalamata for James of Baux in 1381. Then Navarrese governed the entire Morea under the auspices of James.; Navarrese fail in their offensive against Duchy of Athens. But obtain alliance with Venetians (since 1382) and Ottomans (just in 1395).; After death of James, navarrese got complete control of the region. Pedro de San Superano and his family got the Principality of Achaea in 1396 to 1404.; Conflict against Morea ends due to Byzantine–Ottoman wars and the start of an alliance between Byzantines and Navarrese against common enemy.
Aragonese conquest of Athens (1380): Part of Sicilian War; Location: Aegean Sea and Balkans (Modern Greece)	Crown of Aragon	Kingdom of Sicily: Duchy of Athens	Victory: Aragonese Duchy of Athens is incorporated from Aragonese Sicily to Kingdom of Aragon direct rule.
Armañagues War (1380–91) Location: Iberian Peninsula and Southern France	Crown of Aragon	Armanyac County	Catalan Victory: John III, Count of Armagnac, renounces its claims over Kingdom of Majorca.
Third Fernandine War (1381–82): Part of the Fernandine Wars; Location: Iberian Peninsula	Crown of Castile	Kingdom of Portugal; Kingdom of England	Castilian victory: Castilian supremacy in the Atlantic Ocean; Treaty of Elvas; 1383–1385 Portuguese interregnum
Noreña Rebellions (1382–95): Siege of Gijon (1394)Location: Iberian Peninsula	Crown of Castile	County of Noreña Supported by: Kingdom of Portugal	Castilian victory: Consolidation of Trastámaran Castile under Henry III of Castile's lineage.; End to the Trastamarist revolts in favour of Count Alfonso Enríquez.
1383–1385 Portuguese interregnum (1383–1385): Part of the Hundred Years' War; Location: Iberian Peninsula	Crown of Castile; Supported by: Kingdom of France; Crown of Aragon	Kingdom of Portugal; Supported by: Kingdom of England	Defeat: Consolidation of Portuguese independence
Florentine conquest of Catalan Greek counties (1385–90) Location: Aegean Sea and Balkans (Modern Greece)	Crown of Aragon: Duchy of Athens; Duchy of Neopatras	Principality of Achaea: Acciaioli family	Defeat: Acciaioli family conquers all of the Catalan territories on the Eastern Mediterranean Sea.
Razia of 1386 (1386) Location: Iberian Peninsula	Crown of Aragon	Emirate of Granada	Defeat
Invasion of Castile by John of Gaunt (1386–1388) Location: Iberian Peninsula	Crown of Castile co-belligerant: Kingdom of France	Supportes of John of Gaunt: Kingdom of Galicia; Kingdom of Portugal; Kingdom of England	Victory
Anti-Jewish Revolt (1391) Location: Iberian Peninsula	Crown of Castile; Crown of Aragon Jews	Anti-semitic rebels	Defeat of the Government. Jewish population lost its legal protection due to anti-semitic presions and Pogroms. Most of them are forced to convert to Catholicism or be expelled of Spain.
Majorcan Rebellion (1391) Location: Balearic Islands	Kingdom of Majorca Jews	Menestrals and Peasants	Nobiliary victory
Crusade of Nicopolis (1396): Part of Crusades; Location: Balkans (Modern Bulgaria)	Crusade: Holy Roman Empire; Kingdom of Bohemia; Duchy of Savoy; Kingdom of France; Duchy of Burgundy; Kingdom of Hungary; Voivodship of Transylvania; Kingdom of Croatia; Principality of Wallachia; Knights Hospitaller; Republic of Venice; Republic of Genoa; Bulgarian Empire; Polish Crown; Crown of Castile; Crown of Aragon; Kingdom of Navarre; Teutonic Knights; Byzantine Empire; Kingdom of England; County of Cilli; District of Branković	Ottoman Empire Moravian Serbia	Defeat: End of the Second Bulgarian Empire
Aragon Succession War (1396–1398): Invasion of Mateu I de Foix; Location: Iberian Peninsula	Martin of Aragon forces	Matthew, Count of Foix forces	Victory of Marty of Aragon
Sack of Torreblanca (1398) Location: Iberian Peninsula	Crown of Aragon	Kingdom of Tlemcen (Zayyanid dynasty)	Algerian Victory
Crusade of Tedelis (1398): Part of Crusades and Western Schism; Location: North Africa (Algeria), Modern France (Avignon)	Crown of Aragon Antipope Benedict XIII forces	Kingdom of Tlemcen Kingdom of France	Aragonese Victory: Successful revenge for the Sack of Torreblanca; Continuation of Avignon line of anti-Popes.
Bona crusade (1399): Part of Crusades; Location: North Africa (Algeria)	Crown of Aragon	Hafsid Dynasty	Defeat: Treaty of Tunis (1403)
Sack of Tétouan (1399): Part of the Reconquista; Location: North Africa (Tétouan, Morocco)	Crown of Castile	Marinid Sultanate	Castilian victory
Siege of Smyrna (1402): Part of Timurid conquests and invasions; Location: Anatolia	Knights Hospitaller Papal States Republic of Genoa Crown of Aragon	Timurid Empire	Defeat: Turco-Mongol conquest of Smyrna by Timur.
Conquest of the Canary Islands (1402–96); Location: Africa (Canary Islands)	Crown of Castile	Guanches	Castilian victory
Battle of Collejares (1406): Part of the Reconquista; Location: North Africa] (Algeria)	Crown of Castile	Emirate of Granada	Castilian victory
Battle of Sanluri (1409) Location: Sardinia	Crown of Aragon; Kingdom of Sicily	Giudicato of Arborea; Republic of Genoa	Aragonese victory
Aragonese Interregnum (1410–1412): Battle of Morvedre; Location: Iberian Peninsula	Cortes Loyals to Ferdinand of Antequera: Kingdom of Aragon; Catalan counties; County of Barcelona; Supported by: Crown of Castile	Cortes Loyals to James II, Count of Urgell: Kingdom of Valencia; Catalan counties; County of Urgell	Victory of Ferdinand Antequera, who swears to the Catalan constitutions in the Courts of 1413.
Sixth siege of Gibraltar (1411) Location: Iberian Peninsula, Strait of Gibraltar	Emirate of Granada	Marinid Sultanate	Granada victory: End of Moroccan interventions on European Al-Andalus affairs.
Count of Urgell's revolt (1413–14): Siege of Balaguer; Location: Iberian Peninsula	Crown of Aragon Supported by: Kingdom of Castile	James II, Count of Urgell forces Supported by: Kingdom of England: Duchy of Gascony	Victory: County of Urgell is annexed to the Crown of Aragon by Ferdinand I of Aragon.
Battle of La Rochelle (1419): Part of the Hundred Years' War; Location: Modern France	Crown of Castile	County of Flanders; Hanseatic League	Castilian victory
Mediterranean Campaign of Alfonso V (1420–24): Battle of Hoz Pisana; Location: Mediterranean Sea and Italian Peninsula	Crown of Aragon Angevin Kingdom of Naples (until 1423)	County of Provenze Angevin Kingdom of Naples (since 1423) Republic of Genoa Papal States Corsicans allies	Defeat
Wars in Lombardy (1423–1454): Milanese War of Succession; Location: Mediterranean Sea and Italian Peninsula	Venetian Republic Florentine Republic (until 1450) Crown of Aragon: Kingdom of Naples; Duchy of Savoy March of Montferrat	Duchy of Milan Republic of Genoa Marquisate of Mantua Republic of Lucca Republic of Siena Florentine Republic (from 1450) Kingdom of France	Stalemate: Treaty of Lodi: Northern Italy is partitioned. Then, Italic League is founded to preserve the balance of power.; Aragon is recognised as a great power in Italy, and its conquests.
Aragonese expedition to Tunisia (1424) Location: North Africa (Tunisia)	Crown of Aragon	Hafsid dynasty	Aragonese victory
Castilian–Aragonese War (1429–32): Part of War of the Infants of Aragon; Location: Iberian Peninsula	Crown of Castile	Crown of Aragon Kingdom of Navarre	Castilian victory: Peace of Toledo
Siege of Malta (1429) Location: Malta	Crown of Aragon: Kingdom of Sicily	Hafsid dynasty	Both sides claim victory
Battle of La Higueruela (1431): Part of the Reconquista; Location: Iberian Peninsula	Kingdom of Castile	Nasrid dynasty	Castilian victory
Irmandiño revolts (1431–69): Part of Castilian Civil Wars of 1464–1479; Location: Iberian Peninsula	Kingdom of Castile Kingdom of Portugal; Supported by: Andrade, Lemos and Moscoso families	Galician rebels	Castilian victory: Start of the conflict of succession
Aragonese expedition to Tunisia (1432): Siege of Djerba (1432); Location: North Africa, Tunisia	Crown of Aragon	Hafsid dynasty	Aragonese victory
Aragonese conquest of Naples (1435–42): Battle of Ponza; Sieges of Naples (1437-1442); Location: Mediterranean Sea (Tyrrhenian Sea) and Southern Italy	Crown of Aragon Duchy of Milan	Kingdom of Naples Republic of Genoa; Papal States	Aragonese victory: Kingdom of Naples is under the House of Aragon-Trastámara of Naples until 1501.
Castilian Civil War of 1437–1445 Location: Iberian Peninsula	Crown of Castile	Part of the Castilian nobility Supported by: Kingdom of Navarre; Crown of Aragon	Victory of the side of John II of Castile and his valido Álvaro de Luna.
Nobiliiary Revolt (1438–45); Location: Iberian Peninsula: Part of War of the Infants of Aragon and Castilian Civil War of 1437–1445	Crown of Castile	Crown of Aragon	Castilian victory
Skanderbeg's rebellion (1443–68): Mehmed II's Albanian campaign; part of Albanian–Ottoman Wars (1432–1479) and Crusades of the 15th century; Location: Balkans (Modern Albania, North Macedonia, Montenegro, and Kosovo)	League of Lezhë Crown of Aragon (since 1450): Kingdom of Naples; Republic of Venice (since 1463): Venetian Albania	Ottoman Empire: Sanjak of Albania; Sanjak of Dibra; Sanjak of Ohrid; Republic of Venice (1447–1448)	Albanese victory: Ottomans are expelled from the region.; Treaty of Gaeta: Albanian Principalities, under the leadershipg of Skanderbeg, are vassals of Alfonso V of Aragon, as King of Naples, since 1451.
Aragonese–Hungarian skirmishes (1447–1456)	Crown of Aragon: Kingdom of Naples; Herzegovina under Stjepan Vukčić Kosača; Hungarian Alfonso-party: János Hunyadi forces	Hungarian Władysław III of Poland-party Ladislaus the Posthumous of Austria-party	Defeat: Alfonso V of Aragon claims to the Hungarian crown are rejected by Hungarian diet, and his fleets are expelled.
Aragonese-Venice War (1449–50) Location: Adriatic Sea	Crown of Aragon: Kingdom of Naples; Herzegovina under Stjepan Vukčić Kosača	Republic of Venice Kingdom of Bosnia Ottoman Empire	Indecisive
Forana Revolt (1450–53): Battle of Rafal Garcés; Location: Balearic Islands	Kingdom of Majorca: NobilityItalian mercenaries	Peasants of Part Forana and Artesans of Mallorca	Nobiliary victory
Navarrese Civil War (1451–64) Location: Iberian Peninsula and Pyrenees	Forces of Charles IV of Navarre; Crown of Castile	Forces of John II of Aragon; Crown of Aragon; County of Foix	Victory for John II of Aragon
Battle of Los Alporchones (1452): Part of the Reconquista; Location: Iberian Peninsula	Kingdom of Castile: Kingdom of Murcia	Emirate of Granada	Castilian victory
Fall of Constantinople (1453): Part of Byzantine–Ottoman wars; Location: Turkish straits	Byzantine Empire Papal StatesRepublic of Venice Republic of Genoa Kingdom of Sicily Crown of Aragon Orhan Çelebi loyalists	Ottoman Empire: Serbian Despotate	Ottoman victory: Byzantine Empire is dissolved, existing Rump states on Morea, Trebizond and Theodoro until 1470.; Catholic–Eastern Orthodox attempts of reunification by Pope Nicholas V and Constantine XI Palaiologos fails.; Andreas Palaiologos sold the title of Roman emperor to Catholic Monarchs of Spain.; End of Middle Ages.
Catalan-Genoese War (1454–58); Location: Mediterranean Sea	Crown of Aragon Republic of Venice	Republic of Genoa Angevin Dynasty	Stalemate
Enrique IV war of Granada (1455–58) Location: Iberian Peninsula	Crown of Castile	Emirate of Granada	Inconclusive
Angevin-Aragonese War (1460–1464): Battle of the Sarno (1460); Skanderbeg's Italian expedition; Battle of Troya; Part of War of the Neapolitan Succession (1458–1462); Location: Italian Peninsula and Mediterranean Sea	Aragonese Dynasty: Albanian principalities; Duchy of Milan Papal States	Angevin dynasty Principality of Taranto Baronage	Victory: The Spaniard Ferdinand I of Naples is recognized as King of Naples.
Catalan uprising of 1460-1461 Location: Iberian Peninsula	Principality of Catalonia	Catalan elite: Catalan Courts; Generalitat	Inconclusive: Capitulation of Vilafranca
Catalan Civil War (1462–72): War of the Remences; Mieres uprising; Majorca campaign; Location: Iberian Peninsula	Principality of Catalonia; Crown of Castile; Kingdom of Portugal Duchy of Lorraine	Forces of John II of Aragon; Kingdom of France	Victory for John II of Aragon: Capitulation of Pedralbes
Ottoman–Venetian War (1463–1479): part of Crusades of the 15th century; Location: Morea (Peloponnese), Negroponte (Euboea), Albania, Aegean Sea, Anatolia, Balkan and the Black Sea.	Republic of Venice Papal States League of Lezhë Principality of Zeta Kingdom of Hungary (Sovereign Military Order of Malta) Knights Hospitaller Crown of Aragon Kingdom of Naples Aq Qoyunlu Duchy of Burgundy Holy Roman Empire Principality of Moldavia Kingdom of Croatia Duchy of Saint Sava Kingdom of France Republic of Ragusa Grand Duchy of Lithuania Crown of Castile Florence Karamanids Maniots Greek rebels	Ottoman Empire	Defeat: Treaty of Constantinople (1479); Several Venetian territories captured and annexed by the Ottomans.
Conflict over the succession of Henry IV of Castile (1465–1474): Second Battle of Olmedo; Location: Iberian Peninsula	Crown of Castile: Supporters of Henry IV of Castile; Supporters of Joanna la Beltraneja	Liga Nobiliaria: Supporters of Alfonso, of Castile; Supporters of Isabella of Castile	Royalist victory of Henry IV against Liga Nobiliaria supporter of Alfonso of Castile during the 1st phase (Farce of Ávila).; Inconclusive after death of Henry IV, starting a new phase as the War of the Castilian Succession between Joanna and Isabella.
Sardinian Revolt (1470–1478): Battle of Uras; Battle of Macomer; Location: Sardinia	Crown of Aragon: Viceroyalty of Sardinia	Sardinian rebels led by Leonardo Alagon	Victory
Aragonese-French conflict over Perpignan (1473–1493): Siege of Perpignan; Location: Pyrenees	Crown of Aragon	Kingdom of France	Stalemate: French military victory: John II of Aragon fails to reconquer the territory.; Aragonese political victory on the Treaty of Barcelona (1493).
War of the Castilian Succession (1475–79) Location: Iberian Peninsula	Isabella Supporters; Crown of Aragon	Juana Supporters; Kingdom of Portugal; Kingdom of France	Peace Treaty: Isabella is recognised as Queen of Castile; Marriage of Isabella of Aragon and Afonso of Portugal; Portugal gains hegemony in the Atlantic south of the Canary Islands; Portugal recognizes Castile's claim to the Canary Islands
Siege of Ceuta (1476); Location: North Africa (Ceuta)	Kingdom of Portugal Crown of Castile (Juana Supporters)	Marinid Sultanate	Victory
Battle of Guinea (1478): Part of the War of the Castilian Succession; Location: Africa, Gulf of Guinea (near Elmina)	Crown of Castile	Kingdom of Portugal	Defeat
War of the Madmen (1478–80) Location: Italy	Republic of Lucca; Republic of Siena; Papal States; Duchy of Urbino; Kingdom of Naples; Crown of Aragon	Republic of Venice; Duchy of Milan; Florence; Ottoman Empire	Napolitan-Papal Victory
Ottoman conquest of Otranto (1480–1481) Location: Italian Peninsula	Kingdom of Naples Crown of Aragon Kingdom of Sicily Kingdom of Hungary Papal States Kingdom of Portugal	Ottoman Empire	Victory: Ottomans conquer Otranto and gain foothold in Southern Italy; Ottoman garrison surrender the city after 13 months
Granada War (1482–92): Part of the Reconquista; Location: Iberian Peninsula	Castile–Aragon Union; Military Orders; European crusaders	Emirate of Granada	Victory: Granada annexed by Castile; Treaty of Granada (1491); Start of Nasrid–Ottoman relations.
Flemish revolts against Maximilian of Austria (1483–92): Part of War of the Burgundian Succession and Mad War	Burgundian State: Burgundian Netherlands; Habsburg Monarchy Supported by: Holy Roman Empire Kingdom of England Kingdom of Castile-León Papal States Duchy of Brittany	County of Flanders: Ghent Rebels; Duchy of Cleves; Supported by: Kingdom of France Duchy of Guelders	Pirric Victory: Maximilian I of Austria and Philip I of Castile seizure its authority over most of the Low Countries.; Partition of the Burgundian State with France is consolidated in the Treaty of Senlis.
Pallars War (1484–91) Location: Iberian Peninsula	Castile–Aragon Union	County of Pallars Sobirà Supported by: Kingdom of France	Victory: End of independent counties in Catalonia.
Conspiracy of the Barons (1485–1486)Location: Naples	Kingdom of Naples Crown of Aragon Supported by: Florence Duchy of Milan	Baronage Supported by: Papal States	Military victory Political Compromise
Mad War (1485–1488) Location: Western Europe, Modern France	Duchy of Lorraine Duchy of Brittany Lordship of Albret Principality of Orange County of Angoulême Supported by: Holy Roman Empire Kingdom of England Kingdom of Castile-León	Kingdom of France	Defeat
French–Breton War (1487–1491) Location: Western Europe, Modern France	Duchy of Brittany Holy Roman Empire Kingdom of England Kingdom of Castile-León	Kingdom of France	Defeat: Anne of Brittany marries Charles VIII of France
Ottoman expedition on Granada (1487–1495) Location: Western Mediterranean Sea (Iberian Peninsula and Italian Peninsula)	Castile–Aragon Union Republic of Genoa	Ottoman Empire Supported by: Emirate of Granada (until 1492)	Inconclusive: Kemal Reis in 1495 is translated from Western Mediterranean to Eastern Mediterranean by Sultan Bayezid II.; Start of Spanish–Ottoman conflicts.

== See also ==
- List of wars involving Spain
- Military history of Spain
- List of Spanish colonial wars in Morocco
- Anglo-Spanish War (disambiguation)
- Franco-Spanish War (disambiguation)
- Spanish–Portuguese War (disambiguation)
- Spanish–Ottoman wars
- Ottoman-Habsburg Wars
- Contemporary history of Spain
