= Siege of Genoa =

Siege of Genoa may refer to:

- Siege of Genoa (1318)
- Siege of Genoa (1331)
- Siege of Genoa (1508)
- Siege of Genoa (1522)
- Siege of Genoa (1746)
- Siege of Genoa (1747)
- Siege of Genoa (1800)
- Siege of Genoa (1814)

== See also ==
- Sack of Genoa (935)
- Relief of Genoa (1625)
- Bombardment of Genoa (1684)
- Raid on Genoa (1793)
- Battle of Genoa (1795)
- Revolt of Genoa (1849)
- Bombing of Genoa in World War II (1940-1945)
