= Nasrid–Ottoman relations =

Diplomatic relations between Nasrid Granada and the Ottoman Empire

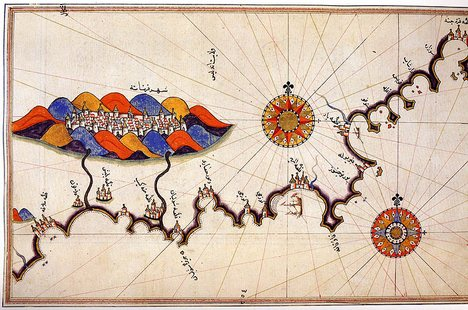
Map of Granada by the Ottoman cartographer Piri Reis, 15th century.

Nasrid–Ottoman relations occurred during the last years of the 15th century, as the Nasrid dynasty attempted to obtain the help of the Ottoman Empire against the Reconquista in Spain.

== Context ==
The Ottomans had been extending into the western Mediterranean recently, especially with the Ottoman invasion of Otranto in Italy in 1480-81, interrupted by the death of Sultan Mehmed II.

This Turkish expansion represented an increased threat to the Spanish Crown under Fernando, which had to deal with a Muslim presence in southern Spain, with the Kingdom of Córdoba. This encouraged Spain to deal with the Mudéjars in a more severe manner, by disarming them, and prohibiting their access to fortresses.

The Turks continued their forays into the western Mediterranean. There were rumors of the coming of Turkish fleet in 1484-1484, and they attacked Malta in 1488. Fernando reinforced the defenses of Sicily as a response, and even made a temporary alliance with the Mamluks against the Ottomans from 1488 until 1491, shipping wheat and offering a fleet of 50 caravels against the Ottomans.

== Diplomatic mission and fleet action ==
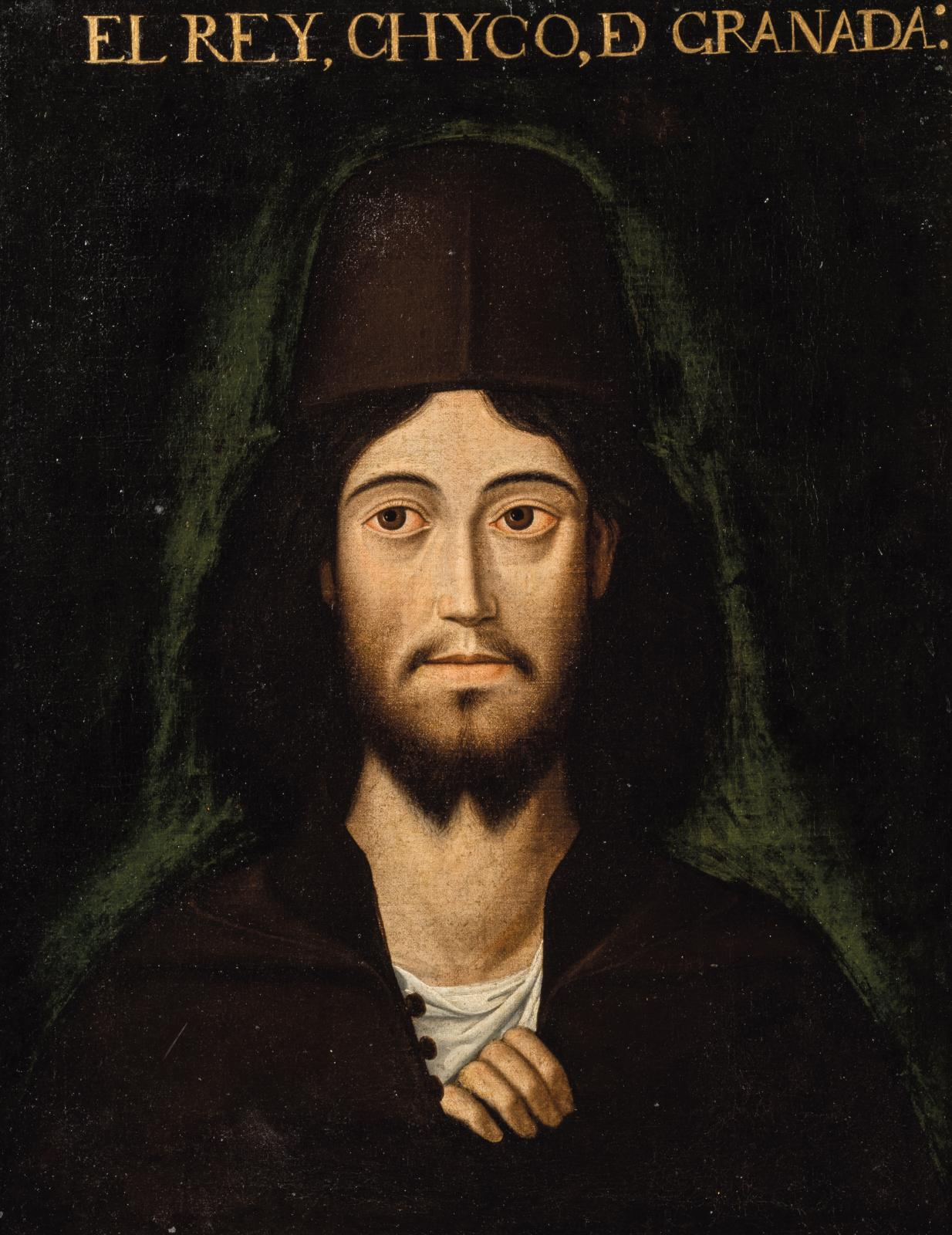
The last Nasrid ruler, Boabdil, requested Ottoman and Mamluk help against Spain

In 1487, the Nasrids of Granada had sent envoys to the Ottomans, and also to the Mamluks, in order to obtain help against the Spanish offensive. One envoy to the Mamluks seems to have been sent, in the person of the Granadan Ibn al-Azraq. Two envoys were sent to the Ottoman Empire, one from Xàtiva, and a certain Pacoret from Paterna.

=== Naval intervention ===
The co-advisor of Boabdil Muhammad Ibn Edin made plans for Ottoman troops to be disembarked in Valencia, from where they would join 200,000 Mudéjars against the Spanish. Bayezid II was however much too busy in the east, especially with the Ottoman–Mamluk War going on, to lend any major support. As a response to the Nasrid plea, however, Bayezid II sent the Ottoman admiral Kemal Reis with a fleet to the west Mediterranean. This was the first Ottoman involvement in the Western Mediterranean. He is thought to have made contact with Muslims of Granada on the coast of Spain. Until 1495, Kemal Reis was active in raiding the Spanish coast, his fleet being based in Bône, Bougie and Jerba. Kemal also ferried numerous Muslim refugees from the coast of Spain to Northern Africa. Kemal Reis was then recalled by Bayezid in 1495.

Granada would finally fall to the Spanish in 1492, with the Battle of Granada. The Mudéjars would continue to have contacts with the Ottomans, as in 1502. Boabdil would emigrate to North Africa with 6,000 other Muslims in 1493.

=== Reception of refugees ===
Numerous refugees from the Nasrid kingdom of Granada were allowed by the Ottomans to settle as refugees in the Ottoman Empire. Among them was the Jew Moses Hamon, who became a famous doctor at the Ottoman court. Bayezid II sent out proclamations throughout the empire that the refugees were to be welcomed. He granted the refugees the permission to settle in the Ottoman Empire and become Ottoman citizens. He criticized the conduct of Ferdinand II of Aragon and Isabella I of Castile in expelling a class of people so useful to their subjects. "You venture to call Ferdinand a wise ruler", he said to his courtiers — "he who has impoverished his own country and enriched mine!".

== Aftermath ==
The Spanish victory in the Iberian peninsula, and the perceived threat of subsequent Spanish incursions in the Muslim state of northern Africa, would lead to further appeals for Ottoman involvement. The Spaniards would effectively set foot in Northern Africa with the capture of Melilla in 1497.
