= Portuguese–Castilian war of 1250–1253 =

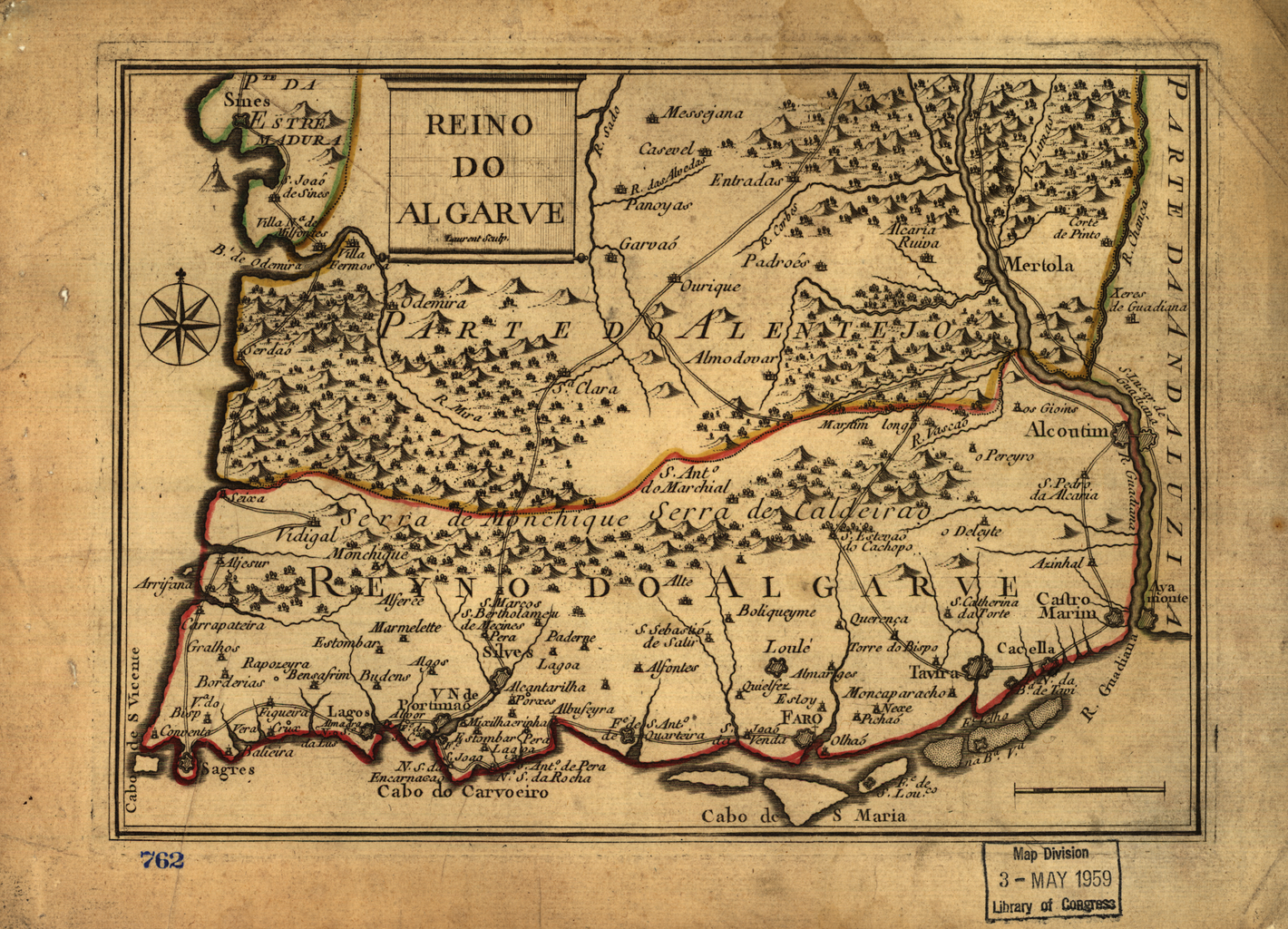
Date	1250–1253
Location	Algarve, Kingdom of Portugal
Result	Treaty of Chaves

Belligerents
Kingdom of Portugal	Kingdom of Castile

Commanders and leaders
Afonso III of Portugal	Ferdinand III of Castile; Alfonso X of Castile

The Portuguese–Castilian war of 1250–1253 was a military conflict which involved the Portuguese Crown against the Crown of Castile for possession of the Algarve.

== History ==
Portugal had been involved in the reconquest of territory from the Moors for several centuries. In 1238, Denis I occupied Aiamonte and, in 1249, Afonso III concluded the conquest of the Algarve with a military campaign in which he took the last cities still under Muslim power, namely Faro, Albufeira, Loulé, Porches and Aljezur. Most of the Algarve had been conquered by the knights of the Order of Santiago.

After the conquest of Faro, King Afonso III did not give that city to the Order of Santiago, possibly to limit the influence of the swordsmen in the Algarve, but rather handed over his mayorship to Estevão Pires de Tavares, a supporter of the King who had participated in the attack.

Aben Mafom, the emir of the Algarve, had become a vassal and tributary of the king of Castile, Ferdinand III, who, for this reason considered the territory to belong to him and in 1250 invaded it.

In 1251, Afonso III of Portugal crossed Guadiana and occupied the Muslim villages of Aroche and Aracena. Alfonso X of Castile, in turn, attacked Alcoutim and besieged Tavira.

A truce was then negotiated between Ferdinand III and Afonso III, but King Ferdinand died in 1252 and his son, Afonso contested ownership of the Algarve. It is possible that this was why in November, Afonso X settled in Badajoz, close to the Portuguese border, and his troops invaded the Algarve.

News of the war between Portugal and Castile reached Rome and in January 1253 Pope Innocent IV intervened to pressure the two kings to negotiate peace, even though he recognized Portugal's rights to possession of the Algarve. It was agreed that Afonso III would marry Beatrice, bastard daughter of Afonso X. Portugal would exercise sovereignty over the Algarve and the territory east of the Guadiana, but the usufruct would fall to Castile until a son of Afonso III turned seven. King Afonso III was, however, already committed to Countess Matilde of Bologna, who protested, but died in 1258, thus leaving the issue naturally resolved.

The issue of possession of the Algarve was resolved in 1267 through the signing of the Treaty of Badajoz between Portugal and Castile. Aroche, Aracena and Aiamonte would be handed over to Castile upon signing the Treaty of Alcañices, in exchange for other villages in the region.

== See also ==
- Military history of Portugal
- Portugal in the Middle Ages
- Portuguese conquest of the Algarve
