= Sack of Torreblanca =

Date	1397
Location	Torreblanca
Result	Hafsid victory: Torreblanca is sacked

Belligerents
Hafsid dynasty	Kingdom of Valencia

Commanders and leaders
Fusta	Unknown

Strength
Unknown	Unknown

Casualties and losses
Unknown	108 captured

The Sack of Torreblanca was a naval raid carried out by Hafsid forces under the command of a corsair named Fusta against the village of Torreblanca, which belonged to the Kingdom of Valencia.

== Background ==
At the end of the reign of Abu al-Abbas Ahmad II, tensions arose between Sicily and the Hafsid Sultanate, then ruled in Sicily by Martin the Elder. Additionally, a new monarch ascended to the throne of the Kingdom of Valencia in May 1397. These developments prompted corsairs from Ifriqiya to launch raids against the southern coasts of what is now Spain.

== The raid ==
In the summer of 1397, corsairs from Béjaïa landed at Torreblanca. They looted the village church, stole and desecrated a silver Ciborium, and took 108 inhabitants captive.

== Aftermath ==
The theft of the Ciborium led to two punitive expeditions by the Spaniards: one in August 1398 and another in September 1399. Although the raid had been conducted by Hafsid corsairs, it was ultimately the Kingdom of Tlemcen that bore the brunt of the retaliation. The town of Dellys, in particular, was sacked by Aragonese forces.
