= Battle of Estepona =

Naval battle in 1342

- Part of the Reconquista
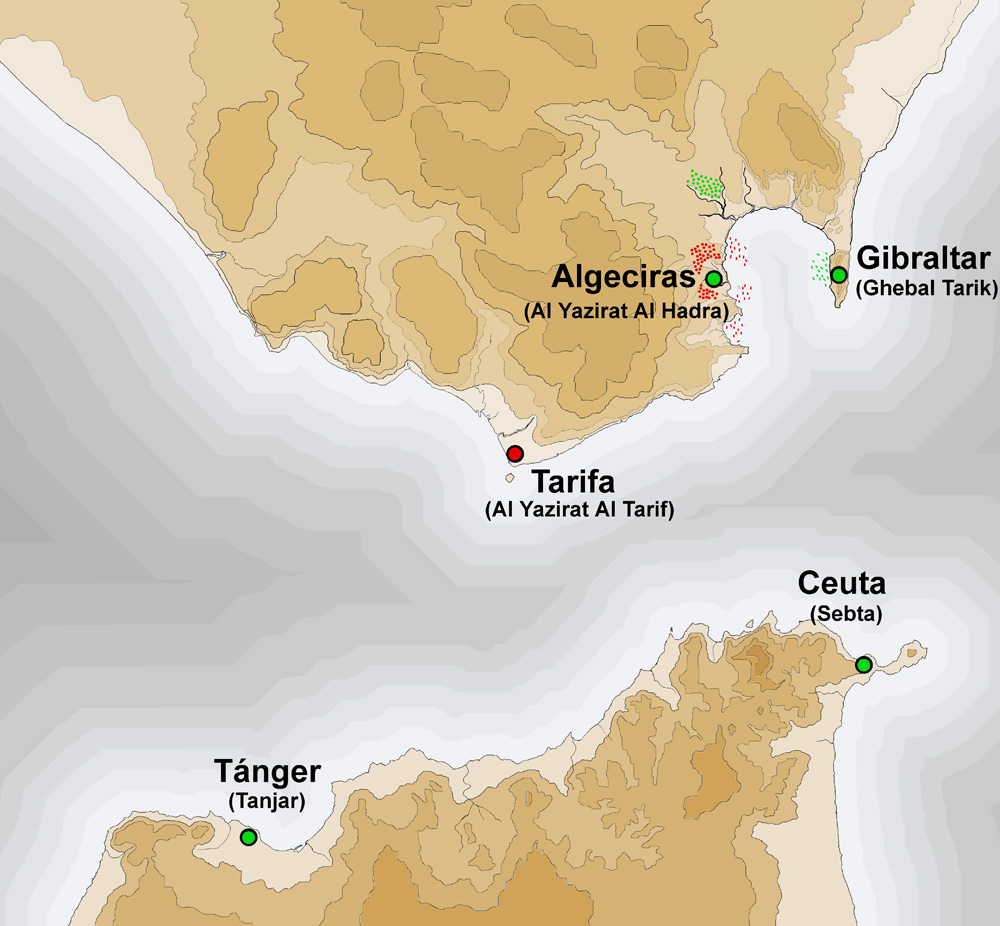
- Map detailing the larger campaign against the Marinids.
| Date | 1342 |
| Location | Estepona Bay, Spain |
| Result | Aragonese victory |

Belligerents
| Crown of Aragon | Marinid Sultanate |

Commanders and leaders
| Pere de Montcada | Unknown |

Strength
| Unknown | 13 galleys |

Casualties and losses
| Unknown | Unknown |

The Battle of Estepona was a naval battle that occurred in the year 1342 between the armada of the Crown of Aragon, commanded by Admiral Pere de Montcada, against the fleet of the Marinid Dynasty. The battle took place in the Bay of Estepona in the Strait of Gibraltar and resulted in an Aragonese victory and a rout of the Marinid fleet.

== The battle ==
The Aragonese fleet had left Valencia to join the fleet of the Crown of Castile in the Straits of Gibraltar in accordance with the Treaty of Madrid. In the waters of the Bay of Estepona, the Aragonese fleet encountered 13 Marinid galleys and engaged in an action with them. The Aragonese fleet was able to capture 4 prize galleys, two more Marinid ships were run aground, and seven managed to escape.

This naval victory, along with the battles of Bullones, Algeciras and Guadalmesí, were part of the campaign that eventually led up to the Siege of Algeciras.

== Bibliography ==
- Manuel López Fernández: Aproximación a las fechas de las batallas navales de Bullones, Guadalmesí y Estepona. Aljaranda: revista de estudios tarifeños, ISSN 1130-7986, Nº. 76, 2010, pages 31-38

== See also ==
- Siege of Algeciras
- Reconquista
