= Muslim conquest of Majorca =

Capture of the island by Muslim troops

Muslim Conquest of Majorca
- Part of the Arab–Byzantine wars
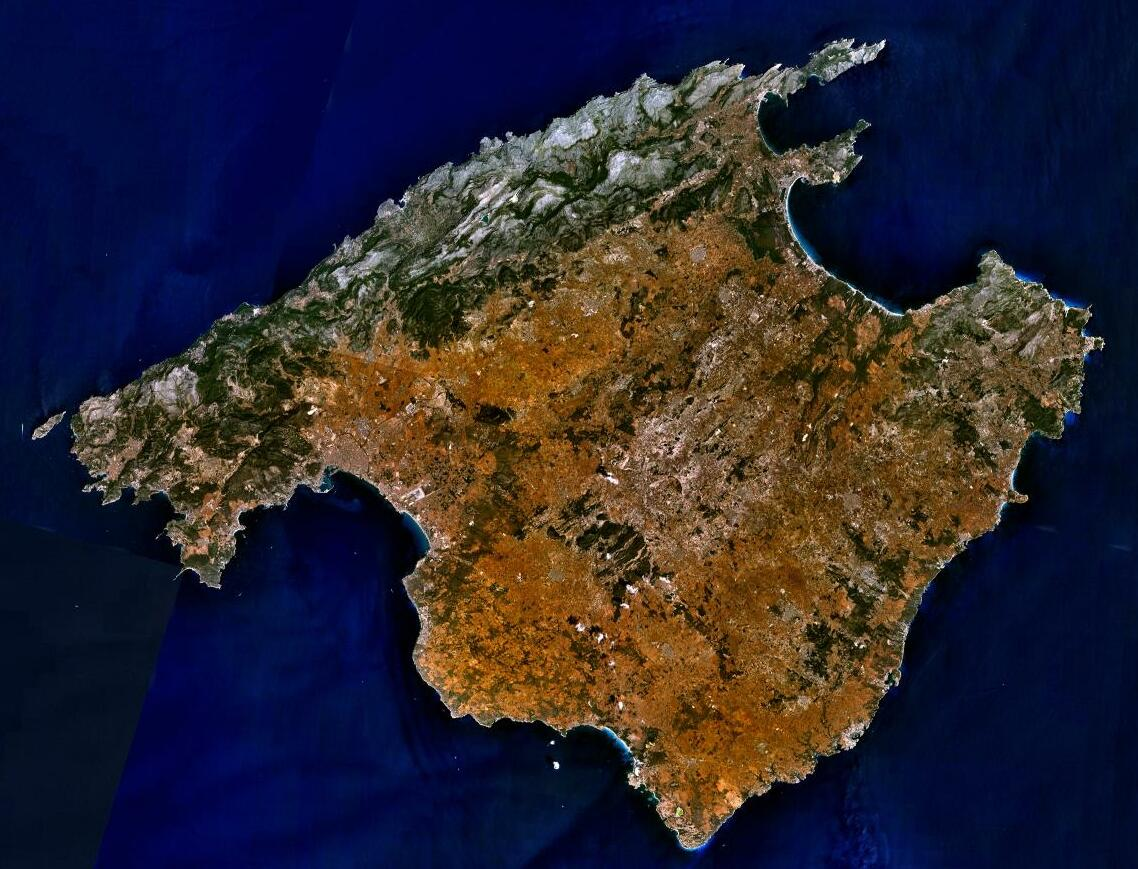
- Satellite image of Majorca
Date	902 or 903–910 or 911
Location	Majorca, Byzantine Empire
Result	Muslim victory
Territorial changes	Majorca conquered by the Emirate of Córdoba

Belligerents
Byzantine Empire	Emirate of Córdoba

Commanders and leaders
Unknown	Issam al-Khawlani

Strength
Unknown	Unknown

Casualties and losses
Unknown	Unknown

The Conquest of Majorca by Muslim troops took place in 902 or 903. It was fought by the Emirate of Córdoba and the Byzantine Empire who were besieged by the Muslims in the Castle of Alaró for eight years and five months.

The emir Abdullah of Córdoba recognized the conquest and named Issam al-Khawlani governor of the island, a position he held from 904 to 912.

On this island [Majorca] there is a great fortress built on a high and desolate place, unequaled in the inhabited world; is known by the name of the Castell d'Alaró. The Majorcans say that when the island was conquered at the time of Muhammad, son of the fifth Ummaya amir in al-Andalus, the Rum became strong in this fortress for eight years and five months after the conquest, without anyone being able do anything against them; only the lack of groceries forced them to go out. This fortress stands on top of a hill of hard stone where there is an abundant spring.

— al-Zuhri

The historiography debates about who were the rums that offered resistance, due to the polysemy of this word; on the one hand it could refer, in a restricted sense, to the Byzantine Empire or, in an extended sense, to the Christians, given that in 897, a papal bull made the islands dependent on the bishopric of Girona, showing the great weakness of the power structures, which have been greatly weakened by successive Muslim attacks.

== Muslim rule ==
The Muslim rule in Majorca (902–1229) began when a powerful man from the Emir of Córdoba, Issam al-Khawlani, traveled on his way to Mecca on pilgrimage with more ships. Faced with a great storm, the emir and his entourage took refuge in Majorca. He discovered an island that he did not know and when he returned from his pilgrimage he tried to find out more about it and inform his lord, the emir Abdullah of the defensive conditions and incite him to conquer it.

Issam al-Khawlani informed his lord that Majorca belonged to an archipelago of islands that the old Romans called Baleària. Soon the emir sent many ships towards the archipelago, mainly the largest one to achieve its conquest. Despite the opposition, the natives held out for eight years and five months. Once reintegrated into the Emirate of Córdoba, the arrival of Saracens was constant.

== Governors of Majorca ==
Lords of Majorca of the Emirate of Córdoba (902–1012)

- Issam al-Khawlani (902–913)
- Abdullah ibn Issam al-Khawlani (913–946)
- Al-Muwaffaq (946–969)
- Kautir (969–998)
- Muqatil (998–1012)

Lords of Majorca of the Taifa of Dénia (1009–76)

- Abu-l-Abbàs ibn Raixiq (1016-?)
- Al-Àghlab (< 1041)
- Sulayman ibn Maxiqan (<1076)
- Abd-Al·lah ibn al-Murtada ibn al-Àghlab (1076–1087) Valí.

Independent Emirs of Majorca (1076–1115)

- Abd-Al·lah ibn al-Murtada ibn al-Àghlab (1087–1093), Emir.
- Mubàixxir Nàssir-ad-Dawla (1093–1114)
- Abu-r-Rabí Sulayman (1114–1115)

Almoravid lords of Majorca (1116–1203)

- Wànur ibn Abi-Bakr (1116–1126)
- Muhàmmad ibn Ghàniya (1126–1155)
- Ishaq ibn Muhàmmad ibn Ghàniya (1155–1184)
- Muhàmmad ibn Ishaq ibn Ghàniya (1184)
- Alí ibn Ghàniya (1184–1187)
- 'Abdallah ibn Ghaniya (1187–1203)

Almohad lords of Majorca (1203–1229)

- Abd-Al·lah ibn Ta-Al·lah al-Kumí (1203)
- Abu Zayd ibn Tujan (1204–1208)
- Abu Abd-Allah ibn Abi Hafs ibn Abdelmumen (1208)
- Abu Yahya Muhammad ibn Ali ibn Abi Imran al-Tinmalali (1208–1229)
