= Catalan–Genoese War =

1330–1336 war between the Crown of Aragon and Genoa

Catalan–Genoese War Aragonese–Genoese War
| Date | 1330–1336 |
| Location | Mediterranean Sea |
| Result | Status quo ante bellum |

Belligerents
| Crown of Aragon | Republic of Genoa: Principality of Monaco |

Commanders and leaders
| Guillem de Cervelló i de Banyeres; Pere de Santcliment; Francesc de Finestres; Galceran Marquet; Arnau Oliver | Ottobono Marini; Lanotto Cigala (Monaco) Antonio Grimaldi |

The Catalan–Genoese War, also called Aragonese–Genoese War was an armed conflict between the Crown of Aragon and the Republic of Genoa that lasted from 1330 to 1336

== Background ==
The Aragonese conquest of Sardinia by James II of Aragon in 1323 turned the old commercial rivalry between the Crown of Aragon and the Republic of Genoa into open war, and the Consell de Cent of Barcelona and the Catalan Courts proposed to Alfonso IV of Aragon the organization of an armada against the Genoese.

== The war ==
Guillem de Cervelló and de Banyeres commanded an armada of 40 galleys and 30 woodwinds and as vice admirals Galceran Marquet and Bernat Sespujades who attacked Monaco and Menton in 1331, and besieged Savona and Genoa itself, then retreated to Sardinia while Antonio Grimaldi armed a raid to attack the Aragonese fleet. John XXII tried without success to achieve peace between the contenders.

In 1332 the admirals of the fleet were the Veguer of Barcelona Pere de Santcliment in spring, and Francesc de Finestres and Arnau Oliver in winter, and Bernat Sespujades repulsed the attack of 13 Genoese galleys in Cagliari, even though he had very few cash at the time.

Ottobono Marini was appointed captain of ten galleys against the Crown of Aragon in January 1333, and in April, Lanotto Cigala at the head of ten more galleys. Cigala captured in Sicily some ships from Barcelona laden with wheat, and four Genoese ships attacked three Catalan galleys and a woodwinds and the Catalans, in their turn, captured Genoese ships and thus inflicted numerous damages on each other.

Alfonso IV of Aragon ordered that the cities of Barcelona, Mallorca and Valencia arm sixty galleys, of which at least thirty had to be ready in April 1333, ten for each city, and his admiral would be Galceran Marquet, who was re-elected in 1334.

Peter IV of Aragon signed peace on September 19, 1336, after a truce had been established a few months earlier with the intervention of Pope Benedict XII.

== Consequences ==
The war made it possible to win the rebel city of Sassari, key for the northern domain of Sardinia and the maritime routes.

== Bibliography ==
- Mutgé Vives, Josefa (1996). "La contribució de les ciutats de Tortosa i de Girona a l'armada contra els genovesos durant el regnat d'Alfons el Benigne (1333)". La Corona d'Aragona en Italia (sec. XIII a XVIII). Vol. 3. Carlo Delfino.
- Mutgé Vives, Josefa (2004). Política, urbanismo y vida ciudadana en la Barcelona del siglo XIV. Editorial CSIC. ISBN 8400082184.
