= Battle of Helike =

One of the battles of the Carthaginian conquest of Iberia (228 BC)

- Part of Barcid conquest of Hispania
Date	228 BC
Location	Helike (disputed location)
Result	Iberian victory

Belligerents
Carthage	Oretani; Contestani; Olcades; Vettones

Commanders and leaders
Hamilcar Barca †	Orissus

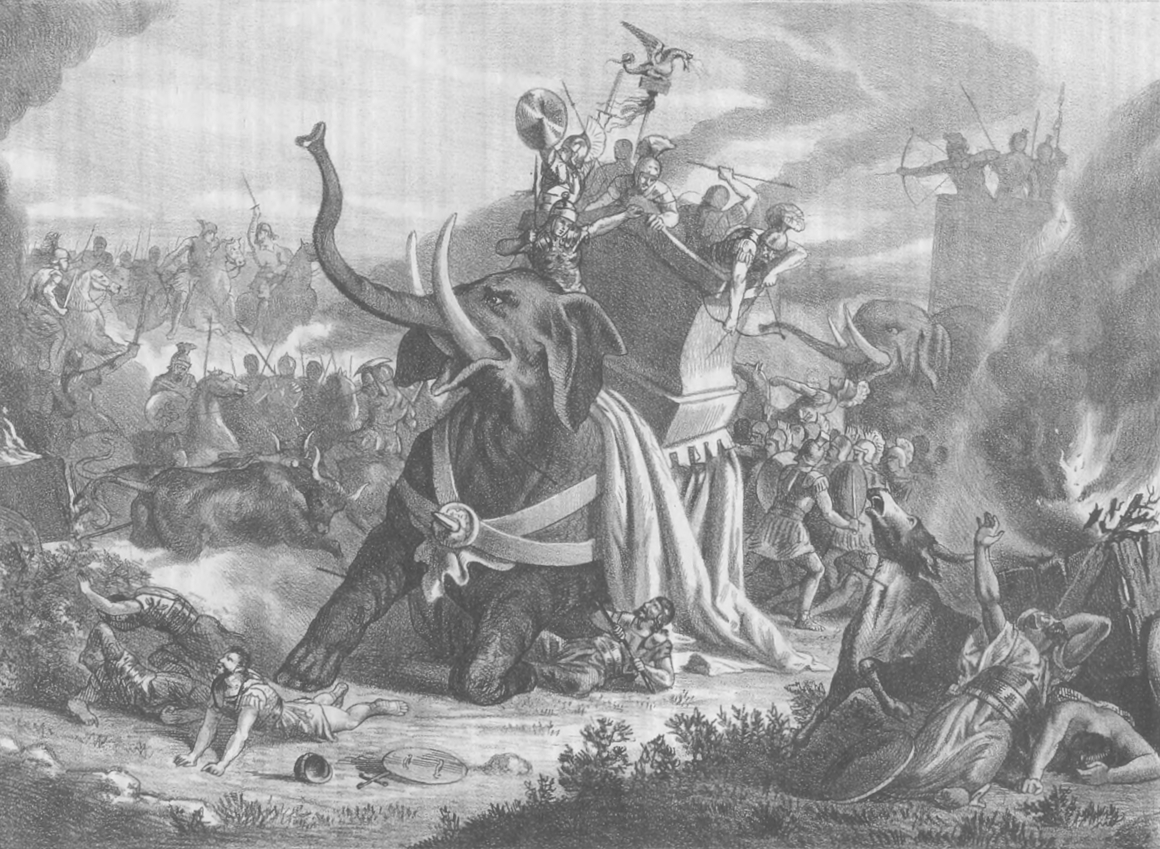
Depiction of the Battle of Helike by Juan Serra

The Battle of Helike or Battle of Ilice was a battle that occurred during the Barcid conquest of Hispania. It took place in 228 BC. The exact location of the action is disputed, everything points to the fact that the confrontation took place in the inland area of the eastern peninsula, the most likely location being the town of Elche de la Sierra (Albacete). During the course of the action, the Iberian troops won and the Carthaginian general Hamilcar Barca died during the battle in uncertain circumstances, but according to legend an association of towns defeated Hamilcar's army by releasing bulls with burning vines on their heads. It is believed that Hamilcar died from the wounds suffered in the battle.

== The Battle ==
The Carthaginian forces besieged the city of Helike, to whose aid came Orissus, the Oretan leader, together with troops from other allied nations. It is not known for certain how the events unfolded. According to some versions, Orissus initially deceived the Carthaginians into believing that he was coming as their ally. When the battle began, he launched burning ox-drawn chariots against the enemy vanguard, which managed to break the Carthaginian lines and facilitate the victory of his troops.
