= Siege of Genoa (1331) =

Sack of Genoa by Aragonese forces

- Part of Catalan–Genoese War
Date	1331
Location	Genoa, Republic of Genoa
Result	Aragonese victory

Belligerents
Crown of Aragon	Republic of Genoa

Commanders and leaders
Guillem de Cervelló i de Banyeres	Unknown

Strength
Unknown	Unknown

Casualties and losses
Unknown	Unknown

The siege of Genoa of 1331 was one of the episodes of the Catalan–Genoese War.

== Background ==
The Aragonese conquest of Sardinia by James II of Aragon in 1323 turned the commercial rivalry between the Crown of Aragon and the Republic of Genoa into an open war, and the councilors of Barcelona asked Alfonso IV of Aragon to organize an army against the Genoese.

Guillem de Cervelló i de Banyeres commanded an armada in 1331, with Galceran Marquet and Bernat Sespujades as vice admirals, who attacked Monaco and Mentone, defended by Antonio Grimaldi and besieged Savona.

== The siege ==
After Guillem de Cervelló plundered the Italian Riviera, the fleet blocked the port of Genoa and sent a messenger to the senate, asking for redress of grievances or offering battle, which were not accepted, and the fleet plundered the surroundings of the city

== Consequences ==
After Genoa, the fleet retreated to Sardinia, while Antonio Grimaldi assembled a fleet to defend his coasts.

Faced with the escalation of hostilities, John XXII tried without success to achieve peace between the contenders, and in 1332 the admirals of the fleet were the Veguer of Barcelona, Pere de Santcliment in spring, and Francesc de Finestres and Arnau Oliver in winter.

== Bibliography ==
- Mutgé Vives, Josefa (1996). "La contribució de les ciutats de Tortosa i de Girona a l'armada contra els genovesos durant el regnat d'Alfons el Benigne (1333)". La Corona d'Aragona en Italia (sec. XIII a XVIII). Vol. 3. Carlo Delfino.
- Mutgé Vives, Josefa (2004). Política, urbanismo y vida ciudadana en la Barcelona del siglo XIV. Editorial CSIC. ISBN 8400082184.
- Pemberton, H. (1867). The History of Monaco, Past and Present. Tinsley brothers. p. 36.
- de Montpalau i de Surís, Antoni de Capmany (1779). Memorias historicas sobre la marina comercio y artes de la antigua ciudad de Barcelona (in Spanish). Real Junta y Consulado de Comercio. p. 141.
- Llobet i Vall-llosera, Josep Antoni (1836). Cataluña antigua y Cataluña moderna (in Spanish). Imprenta de Jaime Jepús Roviralta. p. 100-101.
