= History of Barcelona =

Timeline of Barcelona
Historical affiliations

Roman Republic, pre-27 BC
Roman Empire, 27 BC–AD 395
Western Roman Empire, 395–414
Visigothic Kingdom, 414–717
Umayyad Caliphate, 717−750
Abbasid Caliphate, 750−756
Umayyad state of Córdoba, 756−801
County of Barcelona, 801−1173
Principality of Catalonia, 1173−1714
Bourbon Spain, 1714–1808
Napoleonic Spain, 1808–1812
First French Empire, 1812–1814
Kingdom of Spain, 1814–1873
First Spanish Republic, 1873–1874
Bourbon Restoration, 1874–1931
Second Spanish Republic, 1931–1939
Francoist Spain, 1939–1975
Kingdom of Spain, 1975–present

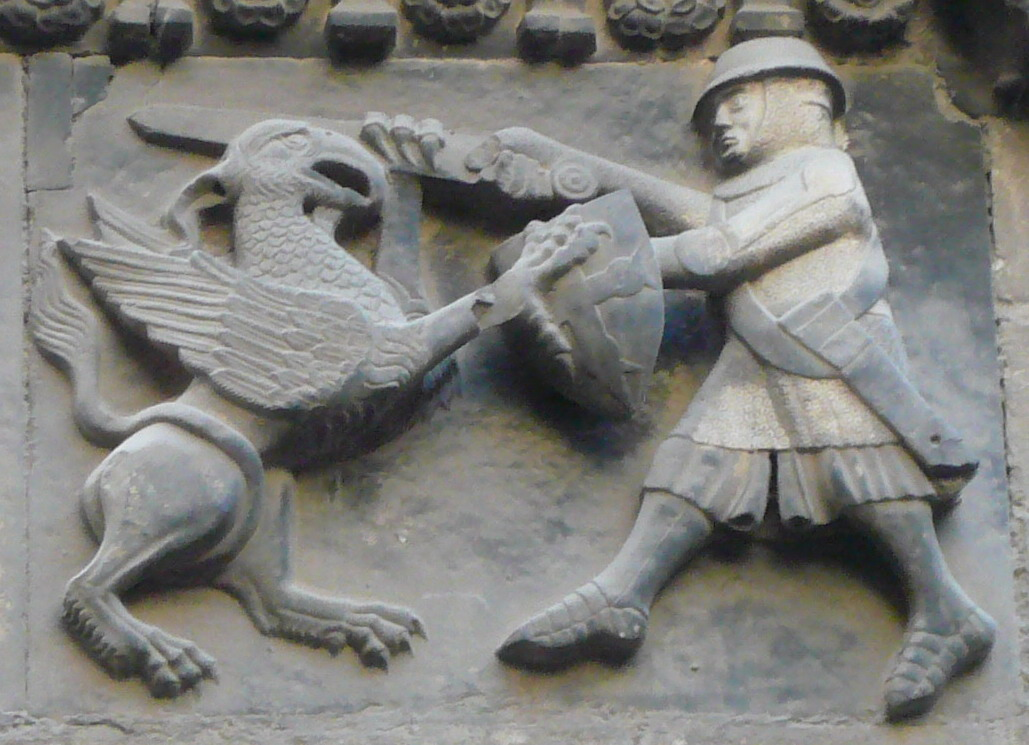
Neo-Gothic stone relief on façade of Porta de Sant Iu, Cathedral of Barcelona

The history of Barcelona stretches over 2000 years to its origins as an Iberian village named Barkeno. Its easily defensible location on the coastal plain between the Collserola ridge (512 m) and the Mediterranean Sea, the coastal route between central Europe and the rest of the Iberian Peninsula, has ensured its continued importance, if not always preeminence, throughout the ages.

Barcelona is currently a city of 1,620,943, the second largest in Spain, and the capital of the autonomous community of Catalonia. Its wider urban region is home to three-quarters of the population of Catalonia and one-eighth of that of Spain.

== Origins ==
The origin of the earliest settlement at the site of present-day Barcelona is unclear. Remains from the Neolithic and early Chalcolithic periods have been found on the coastal plain near the city. The ruins of an early settlement have been excavated in the El Raval neighbourhood, including different tombs and dwellings dating to earlier than 5000 BC. Later, in the 3rd and 2nd centuries BC, the area was settled by the Laietani, an Ιberian people, at Barkeno on the Tàber hill (in the present-day Ciutat Vella, or "Old City") and at Laie (or Laiesken), believed to have been located on Montjuïc. Both settlements struck coinage which survives to this day. Some historians have maintained that a small Greek colony, Kallipolis (Καλλίπολις), was founded in the vicinity at around the same period, but conclusive archaeological evidence to support this has not been found.

It is sometimes asserted that the area was occupied c. 230 BC by Carthaginian troops under the leadership of Hamilcar Barca, but this is disputed. The alleged military occupation is often cited as the foundation of the modern city of Barcelona, although the northern limit of the Punic territories up to that time had been the river Ebro, located over 150 km to the south. There is no evidence that Barcelona was ever a Carthaginian settlement, or that its name in antiquity, Barcino, had any connection with the Barcid family of Hamilcar.

=== Legends about the foundation ===
At least two founding myths have been proposed for Barcelona by historians since the 15th century. One credits the Carthaginian general Hamilcar Barca, father of Hannibal, with the foundation of the city around 230 BC, giving it the name Barkenon. Despite the similarities between the name of this Carthaginian family and that of the modern city, it is usually accepted that the origin of the name "Barcelona" is the Iberian word Barkeno.

The second myth attributes the foundation of the city to Hercules before the foundation of Rome. During the fourth of his Labours, Hercules joins Jason and the Argonauts in search of the Golden Fleece, travelling across the Mediterranean in nine ships. One of the ships is lost in a storm off the Catalan coast, and Hercules sets out to locate it. He finds it wrecked by a small hill, but with the crew saved. The crew are so taken by the beauty of the location that they found a city with the name Barca Nona ("Ninth Ship").

=== Roman Barcino ===
Information about the period from 218 BC until the 1st century BC is scarce. The Roman Republic contested the Carthaginian control of the area, and eventually set out to conquer the whole of the Iberian Peninsula in the Cantabrian Wars, a conquest which was declared complete by Caesar Augustus in 19 BC. The north-east of the peninsula was the first region to fall under Roman control, and served as a base for further conquests. While Barcelona was settled by the Romans during this period under the name of Barcino, it was considerably less important than the major centres of Tarraco (capital of the Roman province of Hispania Tarraconensis) and Caesaraugusta, respectively known today as Tarragona and Zaragoza).

The name Barcino was formalised around the end of the reign of Caesar Augustus (AD 14). It was a shortened version of the name which had been official until then, Colonia Faventia Julia Augusta Pia Barcino (also Colonia Julia Augusta Faventia Paterna Barcino) and Colonia Faventia. As a colonia, it was established to distribute land among retired soldiers. The Roman geographer Pomponius Mela refers to Barcino as one of a number of small settlements near Tarraco, a town wealthy in maritime resources. However, Barcino's strategic position on a branch of the Via Augusta allowed its commercial and economic development, and it enjoyed immunity from imperial taxation.

At the time of Caesar Augustus, Barcino had the form of a castrum, with the usual central forum and perpendicular main streets: the Cardus Maximus (today Carrer de la Llibreteria) and the Decumanus Maximus (today Carrer del Bisbe) intersecting at the top (25 m) of the Tàber hill (Mons Taber), site of the Iberian Barkeno. The perimeter walls were 1.5 km long, enclosing an area of 12 ha.

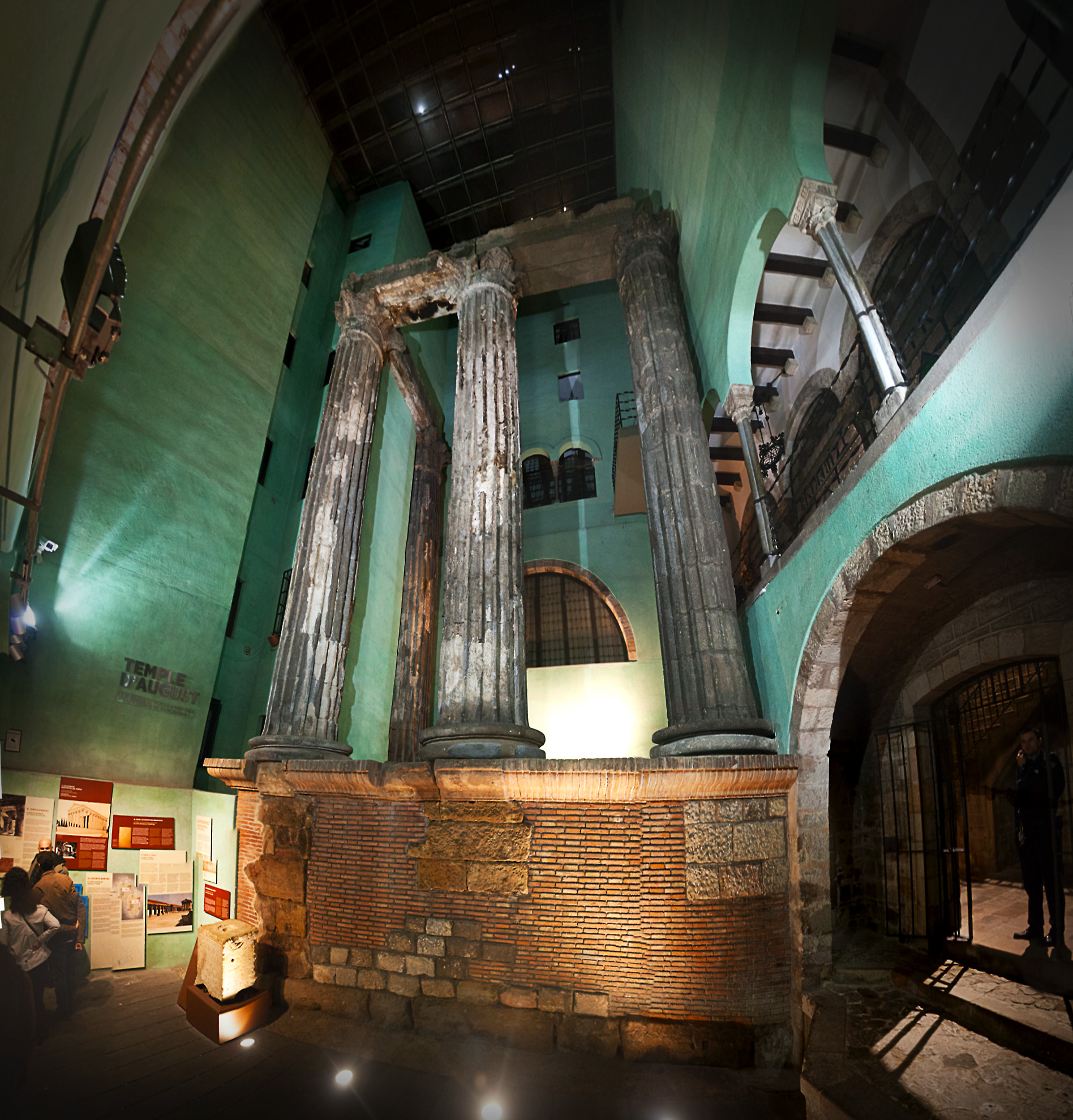
Three surviving columns of the southeast corner of Temple of Augustus in their original location, now within an 18th-century building

By the 2nd century, the city had the form of an oppidum and a population of 3500–5000. The main economic activity was cultivation of the surrounding land, and its wine was exported widely. The archeological remains from the period (sculptures, mosaics, and amphorae) indicate a relatively prosperous population, although the city lacked the major public buildings (theatre, amphitheatre, circus) found in more important Roman centres such as Tarraco. The forum's most impressive building was the temple dedicated to Caesar Augustus, probably constructed at the start of the 1st century. It was quite large for a city the size of Barcino, measuring 35 m by 17.5 m, and built on a podium surrounded by Corinthian columns.

The first raids by the Germanic tribes started around 250, and the fortifications of the city were substantially improved in the later years of the 3rd century under Claudius II. The new double wall was at least two metres high, up to eight metres in some parts, and was punctuated by seventy-eight towers measuring up to eighteen metres high. The new fortifications were the strongest in the Roman province of the Tarraconensis, and would increase the importance of Barcino compared to Tarraco.

Significant vestiges of Roman Barcino can be seen in the underground displays of the Museum of the History of Barcelona (MUHBA) under Plaça del Rei, which also maintains other heritage sites from Roman times in Barcelona, such as the Roman Sepulchral way, or the Roman walls.

=== Paleochristian Barcino ===
The first Christian communities in the Tarraconense were founded during the 3rd century, and the diocese of Tarraco was already established by 259, when the bishop Saint Fructuosus (Fructuós) and the deacons Augurius and Eulogius were burned alive on the orders of the governor Aemilianus, under an edict issued by the emperor Valerian. The Christian community in Barcino appears to have been established in the latter half of the 3rd century.

The persecution of the Christians under Diocletian at the start of the 4th century would lead to at least one martyr dying in the region of Barcino: Saint Cucuphas (Catalan: Sant Cugat). Apparently of African origin, Cucuphas had evangelised in several areas of the Tarraconense, including Barcino, Egara (modern Terrassa) and Iluro (modern Mataró), before being killed at Castrum Octavium (modern Sant Cugat del Vallès, just over the Collserola ridge from Barcino/Barcelona). Saint Eulalia (Catalan: Santa Eulàlia) is also often considered as a martyr from Barcino.

The Edict of Milan in 313 granted a greater freedom of religion to Christians in the Roman Empire and put an end to widespread persecution. The first recorded bishop of Barcino was Prætextatus (Pretextat) (d. 360), who attended the Council of Sardica in 343. He was succeeded by Saint Pacian (Catalan: Sant Pacià, c. 310–390) and Lampius (Lampi) who died in the year 400. Pacian is particularly known for his works De baptismo ("On Baptism") and Libellus exhortatorius ad poenitentium, about the penitential system. The first major Christian church in Barcino, the Basílica de la Santa Creu, was constructed around the end of the 4th century at the site where the medieval Barcelona Cathedral now stands; its baptistry was found in the underground and can be accessed through the nearby Museum of the History of Barcelona (MUHBA).

=== Visigothic Barchinona ===
At the start of the 5th century, the Western Roman Empire suffered ever more serious attacks at the hands of various Germanic peoples, notably the Goths and the Vandals. Alaric's stepbrother and successor Ataulf led the Visigoths into southern Gaul, and after a defeat at the hands of the Roman forces at Narbona (modern Narbonne) in 414, moved across the Pyrenees into the Tarraconensis. Ataulf established his court at Barcino, where he was murdered by one of his own troops in 415.

The death of Ataulf, who had imprisoned then married Galla Placidia, daughter of the emperor Theodosius I, changed the relations between the Visigoths and the Romans. Under Wallia (415–419), the Visigoths became fœderati, allies charged with the control of the other Germanic tribes who had invaded Hispania. Wallia was notably successful in this task (Wallia's campaign in Spain), and the emperor Honorius extended the area of Visigoth control to include Aquitania and Gallia Narbonensis. Wallia established his capital at Tolosa (modern Toulouse) in 417.

Barcino would remain an important, if provincial, centre of the Visigoth kingdom, notably because of its excellent defensive walls. After the death of Alaric II at the Battle of Vouillé against the Franks in 507, his successor Gesalec (507–513) moved the capital from Tolosa to Barcino. However, he was defeated by Ibbas, an Ostrogothic general, outside of the city in 512. Amalaric (511–531) ruled from Narbona, but was murdered by his troops in Barcino, from where his successor Theudis ruled until 548. Barcino returned to its role as a provincial centre with the establishment of the Visigoth capital in Toledo by Leovigildus in 573.

The Visigoths formed only a minority of the population of the city, occupying the positions of authority. The first rulers were Arians until the adoption of Catholic Christianity as the state religion in 589, but the practice of Catholicism by the city population was tolerated. The religious centre moved from the Basílica de la Santa Cruz, which had been converted into an Arian church, to the Església dels Sants Just i Pastor (Church of Saint Justus and Pastor). Christian Councils were held in 540 under bishop Nebridi and in 599 in the reconsecrated Basilica under bishop Ugnas, whose name does not appear as a signatory of the unique document known as De fisco Barcinonensi. This letter to the treasurers of the city, traditionally associated with the council of 592, describes the provincial tax system administered from Barcelona. It is the most informative historical source on the Visigothic system of taxation.

The language spoken at the time was undoubtedly Vulgar Latin, including by the Visigoth rulers who were rapidly Latinised. Over time, the spelling of the Latin Barcino (declined as Barcinone, Barcinonem, Barcinonam, Barcinona) gradually came to include an intercalated "h" to represent the evolving pronunciation, and the use of the different Latin cases declined.

=== Jewish Barchinona ===
The Jewish population of Barcino/Barchinona dates from the mid-4th century at the latest. While the Jewish religion had been tolerated by the Romans, Jews suffered varying degrees of discrimination and persecution under the Visigoths. In his general law code of 654, the Visigothic king Recceswinth outlawed many essential Jewish practices, including circumcision of males, dietary laws (kashrut), marriage laws and ceremonies, and the celebration of Passover.

With the death of Recceswinth in 672, Wamba (672–680) was elected as his successor. His reign was spent mostly in warfare; those he fought against included the general Flavius Paulus who, together with Randsind, duke of Tarragona, Hilderic, count of Nîmes, and Argebald, bishop of Narbonne, had incited all of Septimania and part of Tarraconensis to rebellion. The Jews opposed Wamba in the expectation that he would perpetuate his predecessor's anti-Jewish policies, and had an important political and military role in this revolt. The Jewish population of Barchinona was considerable enough to prompt Wamba to issue limited expulsion orders against them.

The rebellion of Paulus was promptly quelled and punished, and Wamba regained possession of Barcelona, Gerona, and Narbonne, which were among the chief centres of disaffection. Wamba was a political realist, however, and his understanding of the vital Jewish place in the economic structure of the provinces allowed him to reach a reconciliation with them. In 680, Wamba was dethroned as a result of a conspiracy headed by Erwig, one of the nobles, with the assistance of the Metropolitan of Toledo. Besides persecuting the partisans of Wamba, Erwig made new laws against the Jews, subjecting the converts to minute regulations assuring their religious faith. These laws, although severe, were less so than those of Receswinth.

=== Muslim Barshiluna ===
Moorish forces arrived in the Iberian peninsula in 711, ostensibly to assist Achila II in the civil war which opposed him against Roderic. The Arabs saw in the civil war an opportunity to invade the Iberian peninsula, and won the victory at the Battle of Guadalete, owing to the treachery of a part of the Visigothic army, which had been persuaded to change sides by the partisans of Achila.

The throne of Achila was usurped in 713 in favour of Ardo, and from 716 to 718, the new governor of Al-Andalus, Al-Hurr ibn Abd al-Rahman al-Thaqafi, suppressed Christian resistance in virtually all of Visigothic Hispania, and quickly expanded the territory under Moorish control as far as the Pyrenees. After the conquest and devastation of Tarraco in 717, Barchinona surrendered peacefully and was hence spared from major destruction. The vestigial Visigothic kingdom ruled by Ardo (713–720) in Septimania was conquered by the invading Arabs in 720.

Muslim rule in Barshiluna (also transliterated as Medina Barshaluna, Madinat Barshaluna, Bargiluna and Barxiluna) lasted roughly 85 years. While the cathedral was converted into a mosque and taxes levied on non-Muslims, religious freedom and civil government was largely respected. The local Walī was mostly concerned with military matters; the count and the local bishop generally had day-to-day control of the local population.

=== The County of Barcelona ===
Louis the Pious, son of Charlemagne, captured Barcelona in 801 after a siege of several months. It was to be the most southerly gain of territory from the Moors as he was pushed back from Tortosa, and the rivers Llobregat and Cardener marked the boundaries of the Carolingian possessions. The border regions were organised into the Spanish Marches (Marca Hispanica), administered by a number of counts appointed by the King, until Charles the Bald formally converted the territory into the hereditary County of Barcelona in 865.

The first Carolingian Counts of Barcelona were little more than royal administrators, but the position steadily gained in power and independence from the central rule with the weakening of the Carolingian kings. At the same time, several of the counties of the Spanish Marches came to be ruled by the same individual. The last Count of Barcelona to be appointed by the Carolingian authorities was Wilfred the Hairy (Catalan: Guifré el Pelós) at the Assembly of Troyes in 878:

Wilfred, who was already Count of Cerdanya and Urgell, also received the counties of Girona and Besalú. At his death in 897, Wilfred's possessions were divided between his sons Wilfred II Borrel, Sunyer and Miró the Younger, marking the beginning of a hereditary regime. Wilfred II Borrell was the last of the Counts of Barcelona to pledge fidelity to the Carolingian court, although the renunciation of any claim of feudal overlordship by the French king was not confirmed until 1258 with the Treaty of Corbeil.

The preeminence of the Counts of Barcelona among the nobility of the former Spanish Marches was in part due to their ability to expand their territory by conquests from the Moorish walís. They also repopulated their inland realms, whose population had plummeted after two centuries of war. The city of Barcelona, easily defensible and with excellent fortifications, prospered with the increasing power of its overlords, while the other Marcher counties had more limited prospects.

=== Barcelona in the Crown of Aragon ===
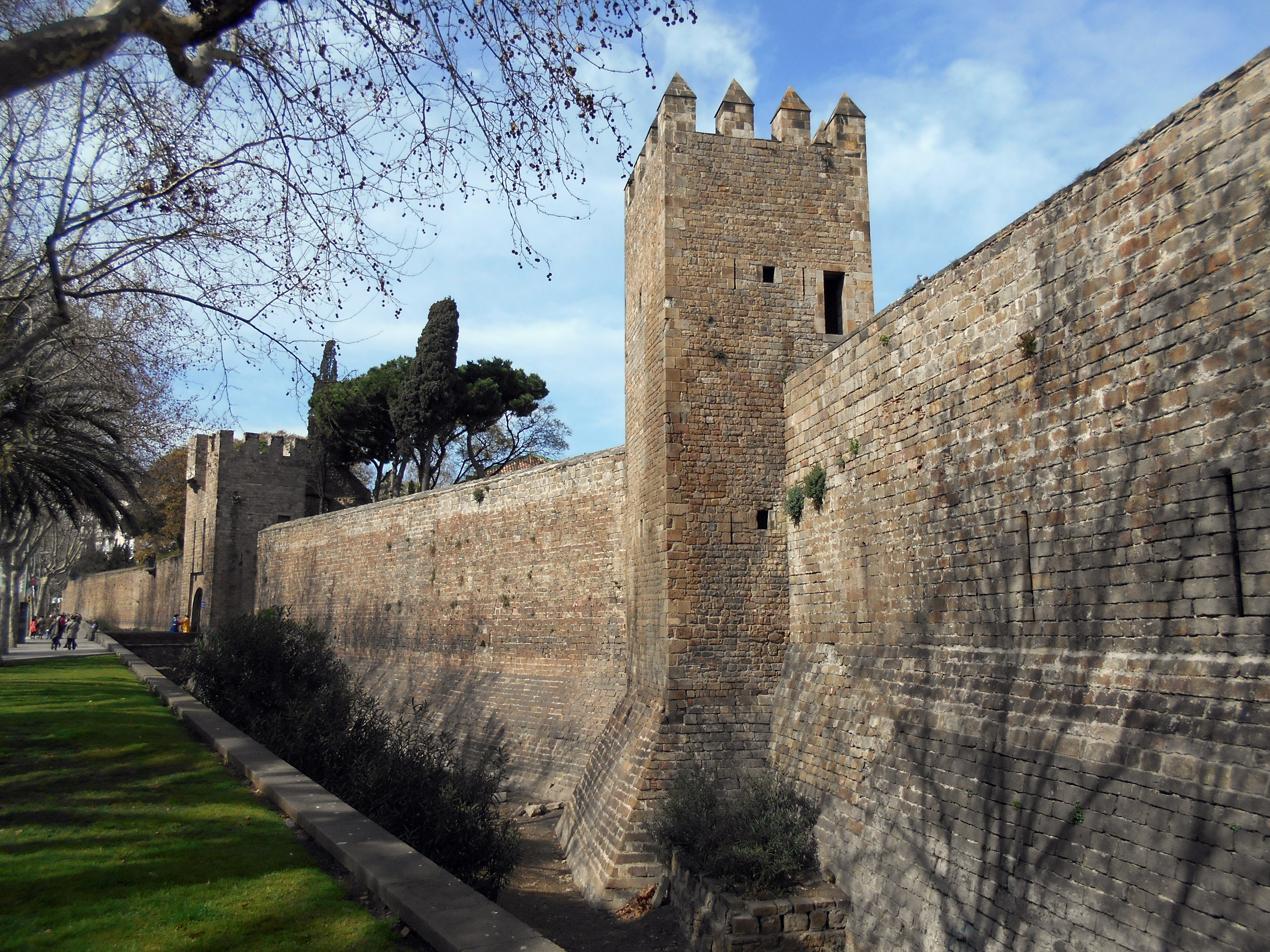
The remaining section of the medieval walls

Alfonso II of Aragon and I of Barcelona inherited the Crown of Aragon in 1162 thanks to the marriage in 1137 of Ramon Berenguer IV, Count of Barcelona, with Petronila of Aragon, future Queen of Aragon, but the administrations of Aragon and Catalonia remained mostly separate. The city of Barcelona was by far the largest settlement in the Principality of Catalonia, at least four times larger than Girona, and a vital source of royal income. The royal court passed much of its time moving from town to town and residing in each of them long enough to ensure the continued loyalty of the local nobility, and steadily developed into a representative body known as the Corts of Catalonia.

The economy of Barcelona during this period was increasingly directed towards trade. In 1258 James I of Aragon allowed the merchant guilds of Barcelona to draw ordinances regulating maritime trade in the city's port, and in 1266, he permitted the city to appoint representatives known as consuls to all the major Mediterranean ports of the period.

== Barcelona under the Spanish monarchy ==
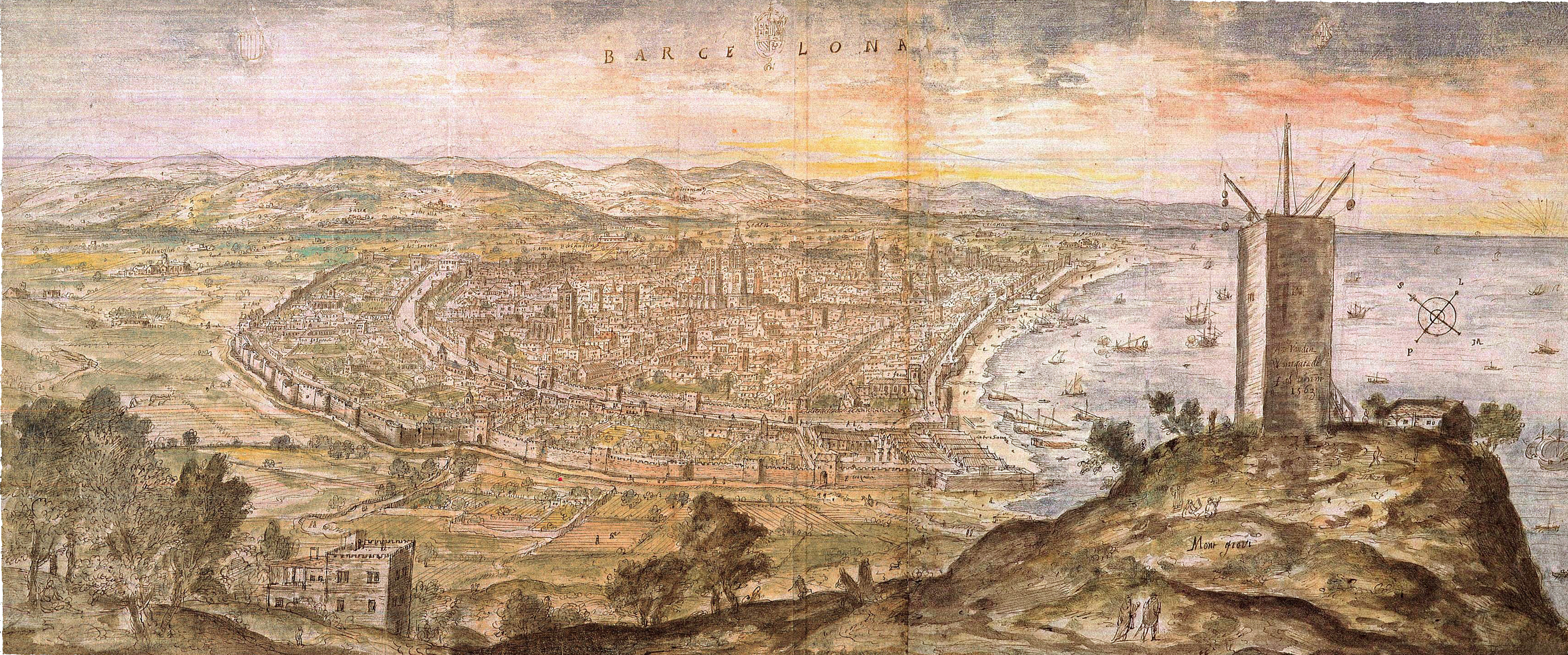
View of Barcelona, by Anton van den Wyngaerde, commissioned by Philip II (1563)

The marriage of Ferdinand II of Aragon and Isabella I of Castile in 1469 united the two royal lines. Madrid became the center of political power while the colonisation of the Americas reduced the financial importance (in relative terms) of Mediterranean trade. The dynastic unification of the Spanish kingdoms and the riches of the New World were not without political repercussions for Europe, leading ultimately to the War of the Spanish Succession from 1701 to 1714. The Catalan institutions sided with the Habsburgs against the Bourbon Philip V, which led to the abolition of the separate status of the Principality of Catalonia with the last of the Nueva Planta decrees in 1716, and to the diminution of the political influence of the city of Barcelona in Spain.

However, from the end of the 18th century, the position of Barcelona as a Mediterranean port and the proximity of lignite deposits in the Berguedà became important factors in the Industrial Revolution. Catalonia as a whole, and Barcelona in particular, became important industrial centres, with an increase in wealth (if not political power).

During the 18th century, a fortress was built at Montjuïc overlooking the harbour. On 16 March 1794, even though France and Spain were at war, the French astronomer Pierre François André Méchain was given leave to enter the fortress to make observations that were to be used to measure the distance from Dunkirk to Barcelona, two cities lying on approximately the same longitude as each other and also the longitude through Paris. Using this measurement and the latitudes of the two cities they could calculate the distance between the North Pole and the Equator in classical French units of length and hence produce the first prototype metre which was defined as being one ten millionth of that distance. The definitive metre bar, manufactured from platinum, was deposited in the Archives of the French Republic by the French legislative assembly on 22 June 1799.

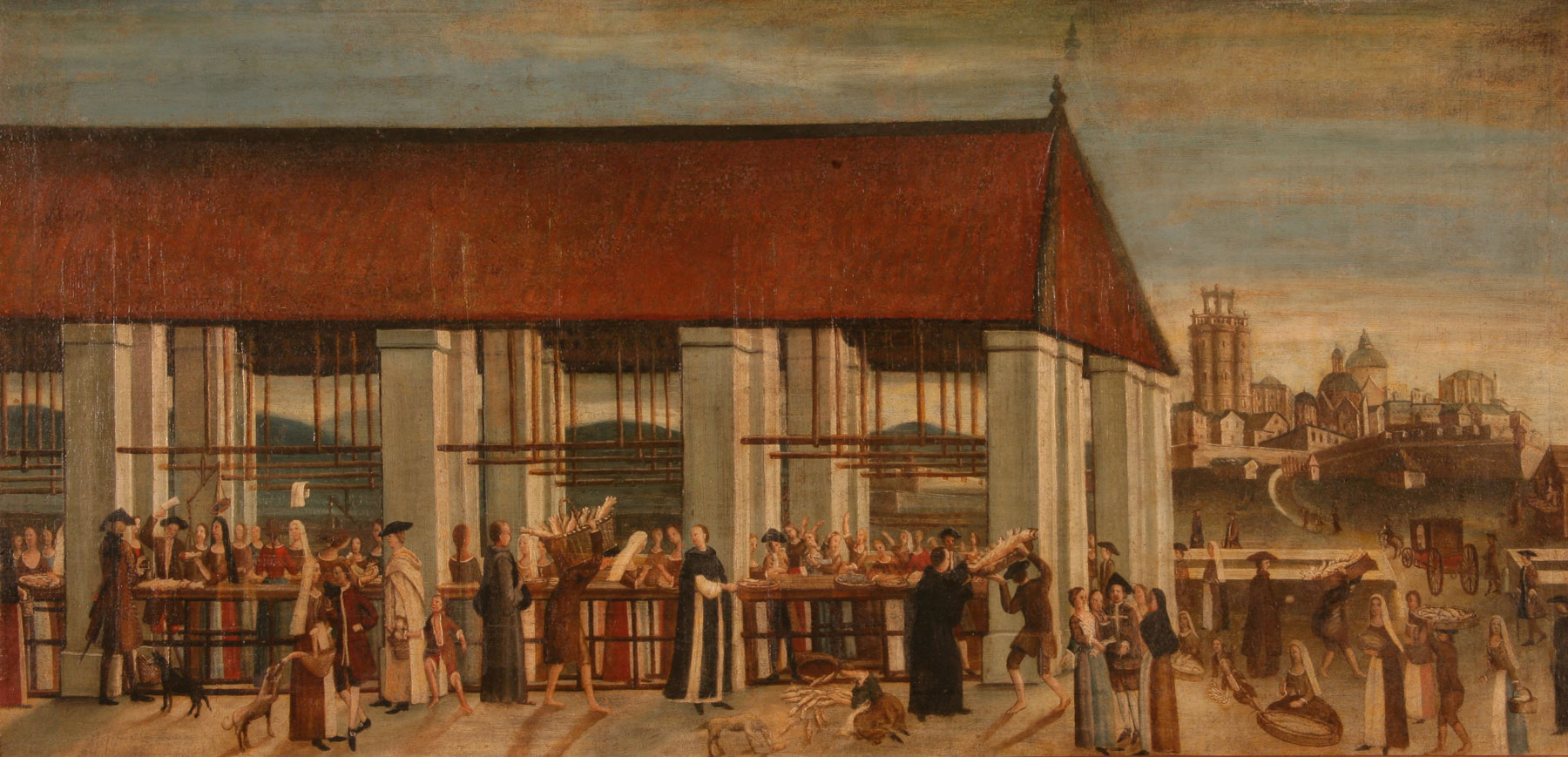
El Bornet de Barcelona, anonymous 18th century painting, depicting commercial activity (foreground), with the military citadel at the background

In 1812, Barcelona was annexed by Napoleonic France and incorporated into the First French Empire as part of the department Montserrat (later Bouches-de-l'Èbre-Montserrat), where it remained for a few years until Napoleon's defeat. In the early regency of Isabel II, the populace of Barcelona came into regular conflict with the Spanish government in a series of revolts known as bullangues (1835-1843), culminating with the 1842 Bombardment of Barcelona and 1843 Jamància insurrection when Barcelona's population was brought into submission.

During the 19th century, Catalan business interests, many of them based in Barcelona, became increasingly involved in the Atlantic slave trade, taking advantage of the void left by the British abolition of the trade in 1807. Catalan immigrants in Spanish America also became heavily involved in owning and running slave plantations in Cuba and Puerto Rico. Between 1817 and 1867, Catalans were involved in the transportation of 700,000 slaves from West Africa to the Caribbean, which "financed much of the industrialisation of Catalonia and the 19th-century building boom in Barcelona." Although the Spanish government had abolished slave trading in 1817, it turned a blind eye to illicit slave trading. When slavery was abolished in the Spanish Empire in 1886, many Catalans returned to Barcelona and invested their newfound fortunes in constructing opulent mansions in areas such as La Rambla.

In 1888, Barcelona hosted the Exposición Universal de Barcelona, which led to a great extension of its urbanised area from Parc de la Ciutadella to Barceloneta. In 1897, the city absorbed six surrounding municipalities and the new district of the Eixample (literally "the extension") was laid out. The annexed towns included Sants, Les Corts, Sant Gervasi de Cassoles, Gràcia, Sant Andreu de Palomar and Sant Martí de Provençals. Horta was annexed in 1904 and Sarrià in 1924. The relative prosperity of the city restored its role as a cultural centre, as is witnessed by the architecture of Antoni Gaudí still visible around Barcelona.

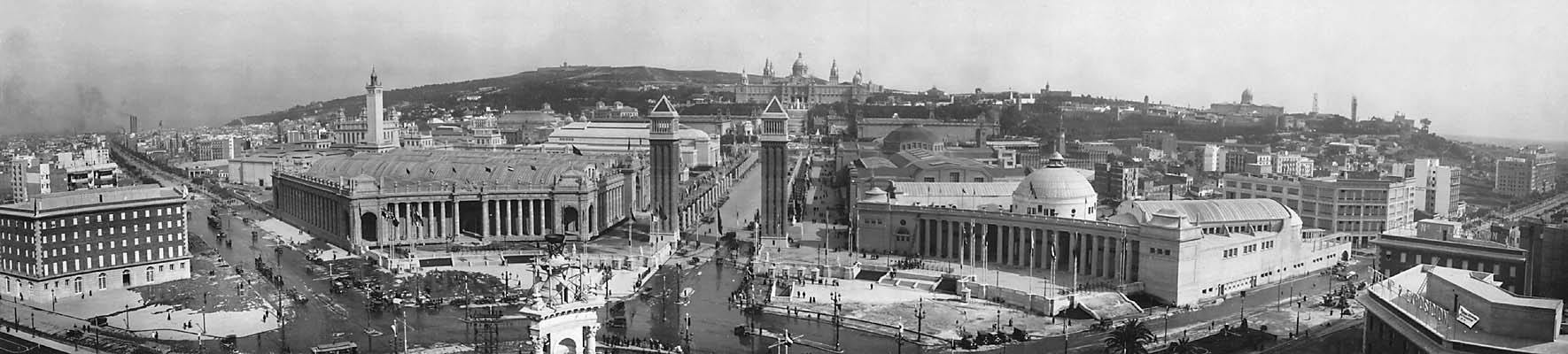
The Barcelona Exposition, 1929

During the last week of July 1909, ever since referred to as Tragic Week, the Spanish army clashed with the working classes of Barcelona and other cities of Catalonia. When Prime Minister Antonio Maura mobilised reservists to fight in the Spanish colony of Morocco, the working classes, backed by the anarchists, socialists and republicans, rioted in the streets of Barcelona, resulting in the deaths of over 100 citizens.

A second major international exhibition was organised in 1929, leading to the urbanisation of the area around Plaça Espanya and providing the impetus for the construction of the metro, inaugurated in 1924.

=== The Second Republic and the Spanish Civil War ===
In 1932, Barcelona became the capital of the autonomous region of Catalonia within the Second Spanish Republic, thus being the seat of the Generalitat (the Catalan institution of self-government). The city had prepared to host the People's Olympics during the summer of 1936, building the Olympic Stadium and developing the Montjuïc area, but the insurrection of the army in July 1936 plunged Spain into civil war. Some of the athletes who had arrived for the Games reputedly stayed to form the first of the Republican International Brigades, made famous by the writers Ernest Hemingway, George Orwell (Homage to Catalonia), and others.

The city, and Catalonia in general, were resolutely Republican. Many enterprises and public services were "collectivised" by the CNT and UGT unions. As the power of the Republican government and the Generalitat diminished, much of the city was under the effective control of anarchist groups. The anarchists lost control of the city to their own allies, the Stalinists and official government troops, after the street fighting of the Barcelona May Days.

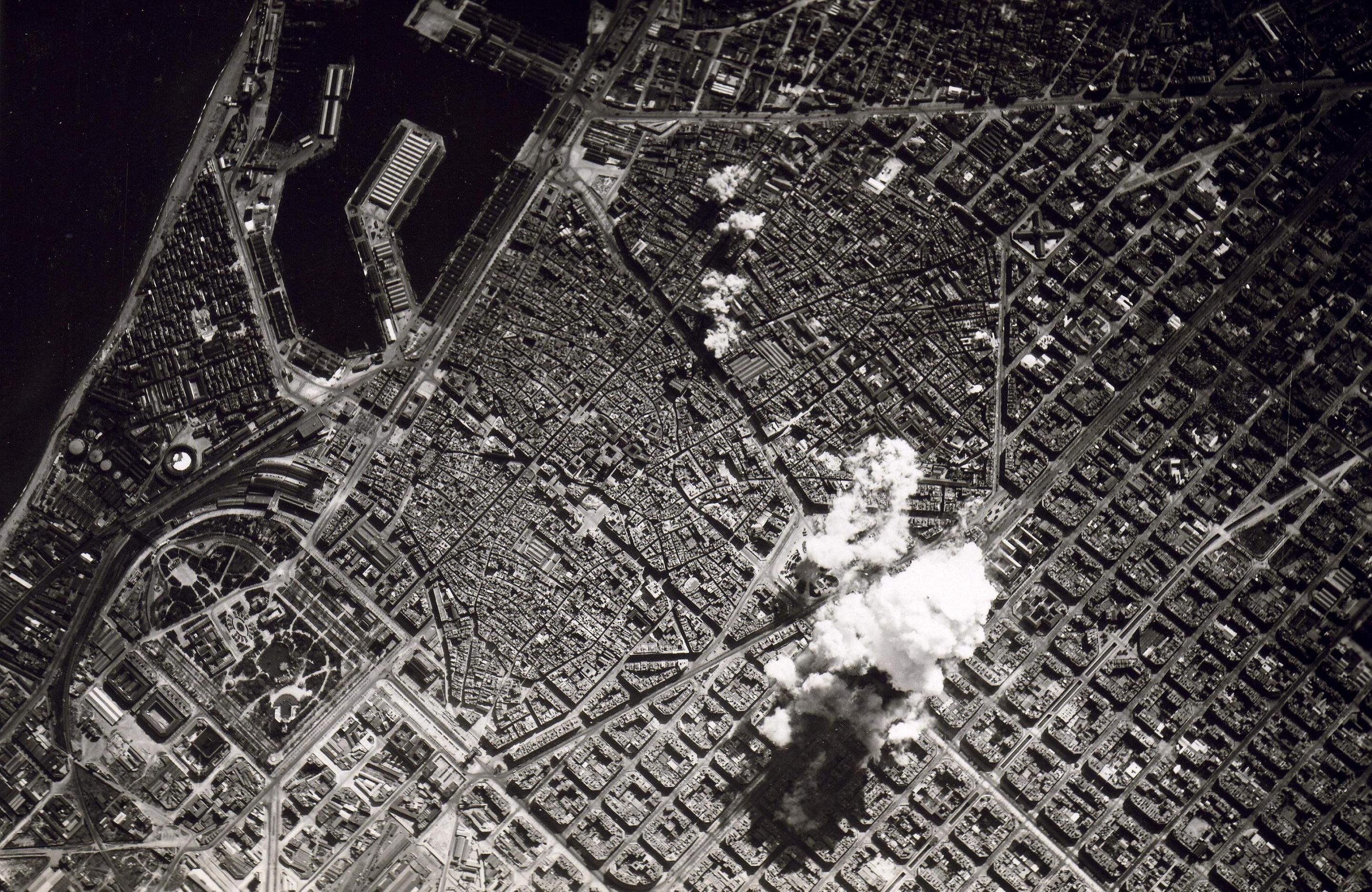
Barcelona being bombed by the Italian Air Force, 1938

Barcelona was repeatedly bombed by air raids. The most severe lasted three days beginning on 16 March 1938, at the height of the Spanish Civil War. Under the command of the Italian dictator Benito Mussolini, Italian aircraft stationed on Mallorca bombed the city 13 times, dropping 44 tons of bombs aimed at civilians. These attacks were requested by General Franco as retribution against the Catalan population. More than 1,000 people died, including many children, and over 2,000 were injured. The medieval Cathedral of Barcelona was bombed as well, though it did not suffer major damage, and some parts of the Barri Gòtic (the Cathedral neighbourhood), including several blocks in front of the cathedral, were damaged.

The city finally fell into Nationalist hands on 26 January 1939.

== Francoism ==
The resistance of Barcelona to Franco's coup d'état was to have lasting effects after the defeat of the Republican government. The autonomous institutions of Catalonia were abolished and the use of the Catalan language in public life was suppressed and effectively forbidden, although its use was not formally criminalised as often claimed. Barcelona remained the second largest city in Spain, at the heart of a region which was relatively industrialised and prosperous, despite the devastation of the civil war.

The result was a large-scale immigration from poorer regions of Spain (particularly Andalucia, Murcia and Galicia), which in turn led to rapid urbanisation. The neighbourhood of El Congrés i els Indians was developed for the International Eucharistic Congress in 1952, while the neighbourhoods of El Carmel, Verdum and Guinardó were developed later in the same decade. Barcelona's suburbs, such as L'Hospitalet de Llobregat, Bellvitge, Santa Coloma de Gramenet, Sant Adrià de Besòs, and Badalona, also saw a dramatic population increase over a single decade.

The city now had an extremely dense population (1,557,863 inhabitants, 15,517 per km^{2}, in 1970), often housed in very poor quality accommodations. The massive immigration also contributed to the gradual decline of the specifically Catalan culture of Barcelona—while the use of Catalan in private was tolerated in the later years of the dictatorship, the immigrants to Barcelona spoke only Spanish. Catalan language education was unavailable, even if there had been any social pressure to learn the local language (which was far from the case in urban areas). The increase in population led to the development of the metro network, the tarmacking of the city streets, the installation of traffic lights and the construction of the first rondas, or ringroads. The provision of running water, electricity and street lighting also had to be vastly improved, if not always fast enough to keep pace with the rising population.

== Modern Barcelona ==
The death of Franco in 1975 brought on a period of democratisation throughout Spain. Pressure for change was particularly strong in Barcelona, which considered that it had been punished during nearly forty years of Francoism for its support of the Republican government. Massive, but peaceful, demonstrations on 11 September 1977 assembled over a million people in the streets of Barcelona to call for the restoration of Catalan autonomy. It was granted less than a month later.

The development of Barcelona was promoted by two specific events in 1986: Spanish accession to the European Community, and particularly Barcelona's designation as host city of the 1992 Summer Olympics and later for the 1992 Summer Paralympics. The process of urban regeneration has been rapid, often supported through public and private funds, and accompanied by a greatly increased international reputation of the city as a tourist destination. The increased cost of housing has led to a slight decline (−16.6%) in the population over the last two decades of the 20th century as many families move out into the suburbs. This decline has been reversed since 2001, as a new wave of immigration (particularly from Latin America and from Morocco) has gathered pace.

== See also ==
- Josep Massanès i Mestres
- Timeline of Barcelona
- History of Catalonia
- History of Spain
- Museum of the History of Barcelona
- Parks and gardens of Barcelona
- Urban planning of Barcelona
- Street names in Barcelona
- Former Municipalities of Barcelona

== Notes ==
Much of this article has been translated from the article Historia de Barcelona on Spanish Wikipedia.
