= First Franco-Visigothic war (496–498) =

496–498 war between the Franks and the Visigoths

Franco-Visigothic War (496–498)
- Part of Franco-Visigothic Wars
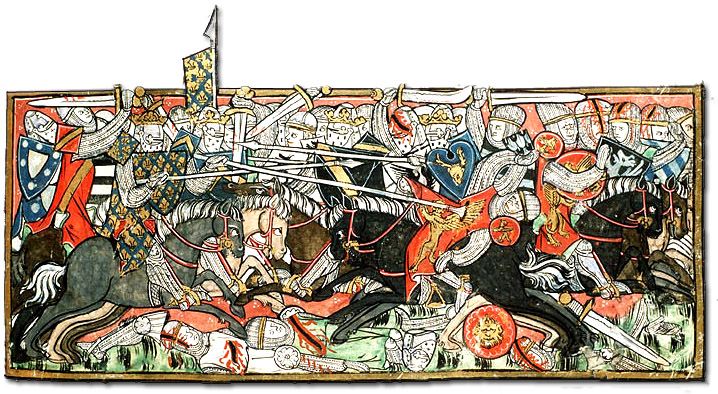
- Clovis fights the Visigoths
Date	496–498
Location	Gallia Aquitania en Gallia Narbonensis
Result	Visigothic victory

Belligerents
Franks	Aquitanian Goths

Commanders and leaders
Clovis I Chilo	Alaric II

The Franco-Visigothic War (496–498) also known as the First Franco-Visigothic War was an armed conflict between the Franks and the Visigoths. In this conflict, the Franks were the aggressors who tried to gain a foothold in Aquitaine, where the Aquitanian Goths had been in power since the fall of the Western Roman Empire. The main opponents in this war were the kings Clovis and Alaric II. The war ended in a defeat for Clovis.

== Sources and interpretation ==
Bishop Gregory of Tours (538–594), the main source about the life of Clovis, reports little to nothing about this first Franco-Visigothic war in his writings. Probably the defeat of Clovis did not fit into the image he wanted to create of him. Other contemporary sources do report on the hostilities between Franks and Visigoths and on this basis it is possible to reconstruct the course of the war in which Clovis carried out at least two raids.

== Background ==
The deeper cause of this war is in a sense the disintegration of the Late Roman army in the west after the fall of Emperor Majorian in 461 and the power vacuum that arose afterwards. In Gaul, population groups revolted and army leaders of both Roman or Barbarian origin tried to fill the vacuum by taking matters into their own hands.

Clovis was a Frankish warlord who surfaced as a shrewd and calculated politician. In 481 at the beginning of his reign, he only had a base of power in Tournai, but barely five years later he had overthrown his rival Syagrius and thus acquired authority over the former Roman army in Gaul. Around 495 Clovis controlled all the former Roman territory in northern Gaul and felt strong enough to attack Alaric in the south. To maintain his fixed army, he needed loot. This was widely available in southern Gaul where the Aquitanian Goths had been given control.

== Cause ==
The immediate reason can be found in the political situation of Spain at that time. Alaric's father Euric had indeed established his hegemony here, but this did not mean that the Iberian territories were directly under Gothic rule. The peninsula was home to numerous autonomous players, such as the large cities and communities such as the Suebi and Basques. In addition, there was no standing army in Spain. Regular military campaigns had to be sent south to maintain local control. The rebellion of Burdunellus in 496 fits into this image. This uprising threatened to endanger Gothic hegemony. The rebellion demanded all the attention of Alaric and for Clovis this was an excellent reason to invade Aquitaine.

== Frankish attack ==
Prior to his invasion, Clovis strengthened his position by forming alliances with other Frankish leaders and with the Gallo-Romans in Armorica, the Armorici.

In the course of 496 he besieged Nantes; the northernmost city under Visigothic rule. Nantes resisted the besiegers for sixty days. The Frankish commander, Chilo was impressed and thus converted to Catholicism. During this phase, because of the Spanish uprising, Alaric was insufficiently able to give Clovis battle, causing Clovis Poitiers, Saintes and Bordeaux besieged. During the latter, an important Visigothic nobleman, Duke Suatrius of Bordeaux, was captured. On the way back from Bordeaux, Clovis may also have taken Tours.

== Visigothic counterattack ==
Alaric did not leave it at these losses and after he had crushed the uprising in Spain, he prepared for a counterattack. In 496, despite winning the Battle of Tolbiac against the Alemanni, the Franks suffered heavy losses (and possibly suffered from internal unrest) against the Visigoths. When Alaric saw the opportunity, he recaptured Bordeaux, Saintes, Poitiers and Tours (if it had been taken) in 498. With these reconquests, all previously experienced losses were made up for, and the result of Clovi's war was largely nil, even though Nantes was apparently taken by the Armoricians.

== Epilogue ==
Despite resounding victories of Clovis at the beginning of this war, in which his armies were able to plunder cheerfully, this first Frankish-Visigothic confrontation ended in defeat. It seems that Clovis was mainly motivated to gather war loot for his army and was not so much out to conquer Visigothic Aquitaine. But the fact that he went far into the Gothic region does indicate that he was blazing with self-confidence and confidently contested the hegemony over Gaul with the Goths, which would also turn out a few years later.

== Sources ==
- Auctarium Prosperi Havniense, Latin manuscript from the seventh century
- Consularia Caesaraugustana
- Historia Francorum
- Liber in Gloria Martyrum

== Literature ==
- Bachrach, Bernard S. (1972). Merovingian Military Organization, 481-751. U of Minnesota Press. p. 5. ISBN 9780816657001.
- Kulikowski, Michael (2006), Rome's Gothic Wars: From the Third Century to Alaric
- Mathisen, Ralph W.; Shanzer, Danuta (2012). The Battle of Vouillé, 507 CE: Where France Began. Walter de Gruyter. pp. 5–6. ISBN 9781614510994.
- Wijnendaele, Jeroen W.P. (2024). De wereld van Clovis, de val van Rome en de geboorte van het westen. pp. 174–179.
