= Franco-Gothic War (507–511) =

507–511 war between the Franks and the Visigoths

Franco–Gothic War (507–511)
- Part of Franco-Visigothic Wars
- Campaign map of the Second Franco–Visigothic War.
Date	507–511
Location	Gallia Aquitania and Gallia Narbonensis, Visigothic Kingdom
Result	Frankish victory
Territorial changes	Gallia Aquitania conquered by the Frankish Kingdom

Belligerents
Frankish Kingdom; Burgundian Kingdom; Roman Empire	Visigothic Kingdom; Ostrogothic Kingdom

Commanders and leaders
Clovis I Theuderic I Gundobad; Justin I	Alaric II †; Apollinaris of Clermont; Theoderic the Great; Ibbas; Gesalic

Strength
10,000–15,000	15,000–25,000

The Franco–Gothic War (507–511), also known as the Second Frankish–Visigothic War, was a military conflict between the Franks and the Visigoths aimed at the hegemony of Gaul. The main opponents in this war were the kings Clovis I and Alaric II. In addition, the Burgundian king Gundobad and the Ostrogothic king Theodoric the Great and the Roman emperor Anastasius played an important role.

== Background ==
The political map of the former Western Roman Empire had been drastically changed on the eve of this war. A new player had appeared on the scene with the arrival of Theodoric the Great in Italy, whose Goths in Italy put an end to the reign of Odoaker. The Burgundian Civil War of 500–501 also brought some changes: Clovis was invited by Godigisel to intervene and Gundobad, who was being besieged by the Franks in Avignon, turned to Theodoric to come and help him. In Aquitaine, Alaric II kept aside and was busy strengthening Gothic power over the Iberian Peninsula. In the end, the Burgundian civil war was decided in favor of Gundobad, but he had become indebted to the Franks.

=== Diplomacy and marriages ===
After the end of the Burgundian Civil War, Clovis and Alaric made peace at a meeting on an island in the Loire River. Both sides had suffered heavy losses in the previous confrontation and Clovis had to give up all his conquests when he was finally defeated over the Loire.

In addition to new alliances, marriages were also concluded. Theodoric, the new protagonist, was in favor of strengthening ties. He married Audofleda, the sister of Clovis, Clovis married Clothilde, a Burgundian princess, while Alaric II married Theodoric's daughter.

=== Attack plan ===
Clovis must have been aware that Theodoric's web of alliances stood his plan in the way to acquire the hegemony over Gaul for himself. Despite this, his chances increased significantly when another uprising broke out in Hispania in 506 and he unexpectedly got two new allies at his side who had everyone's motives to support him. Gundobad sided with Clovis because he thought he could make up for losses suffered earlier. And partly thanks to Gundobads' relations, Clovis was able to establish good relations with emperor Anastasius I Dicorus in Constantinople. Anastasius, also emperor of the former Western Roman Empire, feared Theodoric's power in the west and wanted to prevent a new emperor from coming. Theodoric must have been aware that a Roman invasion was imminent because he kept his troops ready to resist a possible invasion.

=== Religion ===
In the run-up to the new war, religion also played a significant role. The Goths were Arian Christians while the majority of the Romans believed in the Catholic faith. Based on various contemporary sources, it can be seen that it was a publicly widespread tradition that Clovis made the promise that he would be converted to the Catholic faith in Tours. In doing so, he hoped to win support from the Catholic population in the south. Alaric II, in turn, convened a council to obtain support from the bishops in his domain. In addition, it is said that he published a compilation of legislation tailored to the needs of the Gallo–Roman population. With these actions, he mainly tried to cultivate goodwill. Clovis is known to have sent letters to Aquitanian bishops in which he reported that his predominantly Pagan army would not sin in looting.

=== Size of the armies ===
The composition and numerical strength of the armies is mostly unknown: only the size of Anastasius' expedition army has been reported with 8,000 soldiers. The remaining armies all came from the Late Roman army or had been associated with it. The Gothic army had a long track record as the Frankish army did, while Gundobad still wear the title Magister militum. A comparison with previous and later decades shows that it is more likely that they had armies composed of several thousand men, with the aristocrats and their entourage forming the heavy cavalry. The armies also had large numbers of archers. With the Armorican army, his own Gallo–Roman and Frankish troops and supplemented by the Burgundian militias, the army of Clovis was between 10,000–15,000 men strong. The Aquitanian army must have had the same size, while Theodoric had an army of about 10,000 soldiers.

== Beginning ==
In the spring of 507, Clovis began a new Gothic war. It is quite clear that his intention this time was to conquer the south and not a raid like the previous war, because Clovis forbade his men to plunder the country. Clovis had previously strengthened himself with Gallo–Roman troops from Armorica and began his attack by first taking Tours. From there he crossed the Vienne river which was difficult: it was swollen due to heavy rains. Moreover, this time the element of surprise was missing and Clovis struggled to control his troops, a monastery almost went up in flames.

=== Battle of Vouillé ===
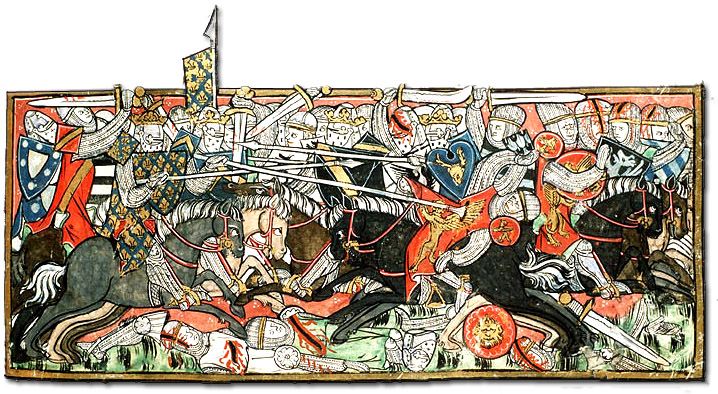
Clovis fighting the Visigoths at the battle of Vouillé

As he marched from Nantes to Poitiers, Clovis' march was interrupted by Alaric II – who was apparently aware of Clovis' support among the Catholics of his subjects – and who decided to confront the Franks before they could join forces. The outcome of this first major battle was disastrous for him. Gregory of Tours, the main source on the details of this battle, reports that the nucleus of the Visigothic army was destroyed and Alaric II was killed by Clovis in a duel.

The threat of an invasion by the Roman army from the East meant that Theodoric could not interfere in the battle. The raid actually took place in early 508 in the boot of Italy, but the Roman intervention was not aimed at conquest. It did not seek confrontation with Theodoric's army and limited itself only to the conquest and plundering of cities in the south. Only when Theodoric had the situation under control, he sent an army to the north to assist the Goths in Gaul.

=== Conquest of the East ===
With their monarch killed, the Visigothic army fled in dismay, southern Aquitaine was completely open to the Frankish army. Clovis sent his eldest son Theuderic to the east to occupy the Gothic cities in the Auvergne. The Frankish prince marched from Clermont to Rodez and eventually arrived at Albi. Meanwhile, Gundobad had invaded the South with an army. Assisted by the Franks, he besieged Arles. However, after a prolonged siege, the Ostrogoths led by Ibbas intervened in 508 and inflicted heavy casualties, forcing the Burgundians to retreat.

=== Further course of the war ===
Clovis sank further south and took all the cities he encountered. At the end of 507, Clovis was able to conquer Bordeaux and spent the winter there. The following year, Clovis was able to seize the enemy capital of Toulouse and their treasury. The Visigothic court had been moved to Narbonne, which is why Clovis sought to take it too, but the city was protected by mountainous terrain, so Clovis was forced to besiege Carcassonne, located between Toulouse and Narbonne. However, the siege ended in failure, as Ostrogothic auxiliary forces led by Ibbas also arrived there and managed to expel the Franks. The defeated Clovis returned and took Angoulême, which he initially ignored. To destroy the Ostrogoths' opportunities to recapturn cities, Clovis installed extensive garrisons in the newly captured cities.

After the defeat and death of Alaric, the Goths chose his eldest son Gesalic as his successor. In the south he withstand and received help from the Ostrogoths who recaptured Narbonne and defended Arles against Frankish conquest, after which a stalemate arose. As far as is known, no major battles were fought after that.

== End of the war and aftermath ==
Clovis was baptised in 508 – as he had promised – after the victory over Alaric in Tours. He received the patriciate, the consulate of honor and a golden crown from Emperor Anastasius. However, the war didn't end: Gundobad conducted another campaign against Gesalic in Spain and besieged Barcelona. In 511, the Visigothic kingdom was brought under the direct control of Theodoric. Theodoric overthrew Gesalec after a battle near Barcelona, and formed a Gothic superstate extending from the Atlantic Ocean to the Danube. While territories that had been lost to the Franks remained so, Theodoric made a peace arrangement with the heirs of the Frankish kingdom after Clovis died.

== Sources ==
- Gregory of Tours, Histories
- Cassiodorus, Variae
- Marcellinus Comes, Annales
- Chronica Gallica of 511
- Magnus Felix Ennodius, Panegyry of Theodoric

== Bibliography ==
- MacGeorge, Penny (2002). Late Roman Warlords. Oxford University Press. p. 157. ISBN 9780191530913.
- Mathisen, Ralph W. (2012). The Battle of Vouillé, 507 CE: Where France Began. Walter de Gruyter. ISBN 978-1-61451-099-4.
- Wijnendaele, Jeroen W.P. (2024). De wereld van Clovis, de val van Rome en de geboorte van het westen [The World of Clovis, the Fall of Rome and the Birth of the West] (in Dutch). Ertsberg. ISBN 9789464984064.
- Wolfram, Herwig (1988). History of the Goths. Berkeley and Los Angeles: University of California Press.
