= Franco-Visigothic Wars =

Series of wars between the Franks and Visigoths

- Part of The battles of Clovis I
- Army movement during the Second Franco-Visigothic War
Date	496–508
Location	Aquitaine, Provence, Burgundy
Result	Frankish victory
Territorial changes	Gallia Aquitania is annexed by the Franks

Belligerents
Kingdom of the Franks	Kingdom of the Visigoths
Armorica; Kingdom of the Burgundians (post-507); Empire of the Romans	Kingdom of the Ostrogoths; Kingdom of the Burgundians (pre-507); Alemanni

Commanders and leaders
Clovis I Theuderic I Godegisel †; Gundobad (post-507); Aurelianus; Chilo	Alaric II †; Suatrius (POW); Gundobad (pre-507); Aridius; Gesalec; Theudis; Theoderic the Great

The Franco-Visigothic Wars were a series of wars between the Franks and the Visigoths, but it also involved the Burgundians, the Ostrogoths and the Romans. The most noteworthy war of the conflict would be the Second Franco-Visigothic War that included the famous Battle of Vouillé and resulted in Frankish annexation of most of Southern France.

== Background ==
In 486, Clovis I defeated the Gallo-Romans decisively, impelling the commander, Syagrius to flee to the court of Alaric II. Probably in 487, while Clovis was pillaging the land and besieging the cities that resisted (at least Verdun and Paris) he sent the King of the Visigoths an ultimatum: hand-over Syagrius or risk war. Therefore, instead of aiding the exile, Alaric—reluctant to combat the Franks—forfeited Syagrius, whom Clovis immediately executed.

== First Franco-Visigothic war (496–498) ==
The main source of Clovis life, the Bishop Gregory of Tours, reports little to nothing about The first Franco-Visigothic war in his writings. Other contemporary sources do report on the hostilities between Franks and Visigoths and on this basis it is possible to reconstruct the course of the war in which Clovis carried out at least two raids. Despite resounding victories of Clovis at the beginning of this war, in which his armies were able to plunder cheerfully, this first Frankish-Visigothic confrontation ended in defeat. It seems that Clovis was mainly motivated to gather war for his army and was not so much out to conquer Visigothic Aquitaine.

== Burgundian civil war (500–501) ==
=== Frankish intervention ===
Godegisel, the brother of King Gundobad of the Burgundians seduced his brother-in-law, Clovis with the promise of annual tribute and territorial cessions to plot against Gundobad and in the year 500, the Franks entered the kingdom. Gundobad requested aid from his brother, and together the brothers marched against the invaders. The three armies met near Dijon, soon Gundobad found himself fighting the Franks and the forces of his brother and fled to the City of Avignon. Victorious, Godegisel retired to Vienne and assumed the kingship of the kingdom, but Clovis was not satisfied and marched to besiege Avignon. However, after a lengthy siege, a Roman magistrate of the city and a general, Aridius, convinced Clovis that the city could not be taken. Therefore, Clovis departed from the kingdom after parleying with Gundobad, who agreed to pay annual tribute.

=== Visigothic intervention ===
In 501, discontented, Gundobad allied himself with Alaric II, thus he stopped paying the annual tribute to Clovis and with Visigothic help besieged his brother in Vienne. When the city fell, Gundobad executed Godegisel and many of his Burgundian supporters, and thus re-established himself as the king of the Burgundians. For their efforts, Gundobad sent the Frankish captives to Alaric and gifted Avignon to Alaric II, who proceeded to meet up with Clovis. The two kings met near in the Village of Amboise, where Alaric agreed to release the captives, while Clovis returned all Visigothic territory he still held.

== Second Franco-Visigothic war (507–511) ==
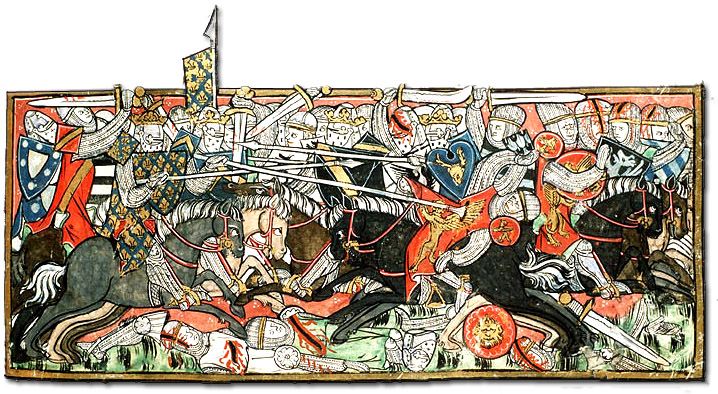
Clovis fighting the Visigoths

=== Road to Vouillé ===
After allying the Armonici around 503 and gaining the approval of magnates of his realm, Clovis began the liberation of Aquitaine in 507. It's quite clear that this was intended to be a liberation and not an invasion, for Clovis forbade his men from pillaging the land. While marching from Nantes to Poitiers, Clovis' march was interrupted by Alaric II‒who was apparently aware of Clovis' support among the Catholics of his subjects and decided to defeat the Franks before they could join forces. This event is referred to as the Battle of Vouille, though little is known about this incident, only that the core of Visigothic army was destroyed and that Alaric II was killed (supposedly by Clovis in a single combat).

=== Eastern campaign ===
Clovis sent his son Theuderic to lead an independent campaign. The Frankish prince advanced from Clermont to Rodez, finally arriving in Albi. Meanwhile, Gundobad, assisted by the Franks, besieged Arles. However, after a lengthy siege, the Ostrogoths intervened and deflected a high loss, forcing the Burgundians to retreat.

=== Western campaign ===
Clovis was able to recapture Bordeaux before the end of 507 and spend the winter there. In the following year, Clovis was able to seize the enemy capital of Toulouse and the treasury with it. The Visigothic court had relocated Narbonne, hence Clovis aspired to take it as well, however, the city was protected by mountainous terrain, thus Clovis was forced to besiege Carcassonne, located between Toulouse and Narbonne. The siege, however, ended in failure, for Ostrogothic relief force was successful in driving the Franks off. The defeated Clovis turned back and took Angouleme, that he initially ignored. In order to nullify the chances of Ostrogoths recapturing any cities, Clovis installed extensive garrisons in the recently taken cities.
