= Burgundian Civil War =

Civil war in Burgundy from 500 to 501

Burgundian Civil War (500-501)
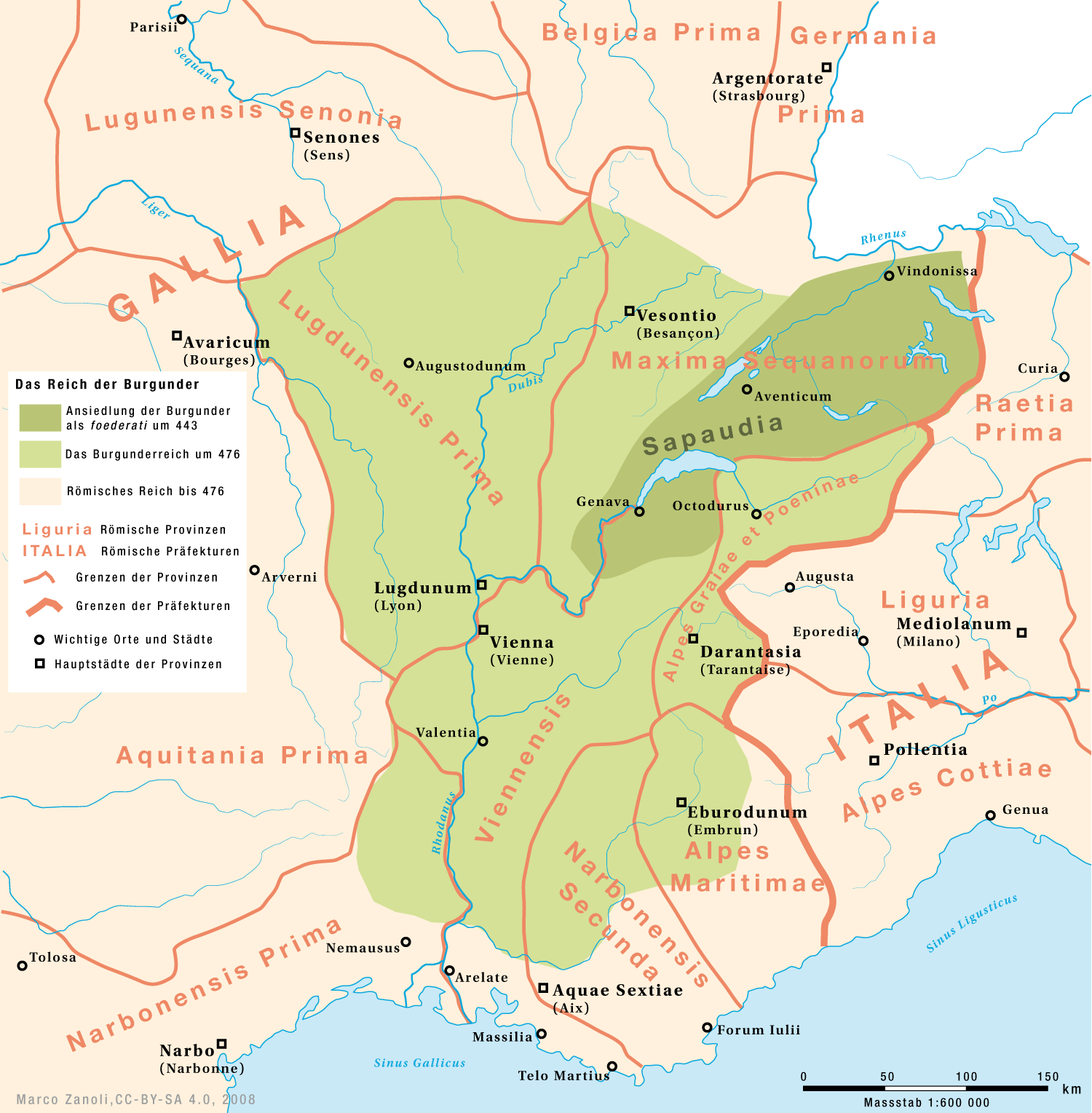
- the Burgundian Empire (443-532)
Date	500-501
Location	Gallia Lugdunesis I and Maxima Sequanorum
Result	Godegisel defeated

Belligerents
Burgundy; Franconia	Burgundy; Visigoths

Commanders and leaders
Godegisel; Clovis I	Gundobad; Alarik II

The Burgundian Civil War was a military conflict between the Burgundian kings Gundobad and Godegisel. The war took place around 500 in the former Roman provinces of Gallia Lugdunesis I and Maxima Sequanorum, where a Burgundian state had emerged after the fall of the Western Roman Empire. The kings were brothers who both controlled parts of Burgundy. Clovis I, the king of the Franks, was also involved.

== Sources ==
The story of this war is briefly described by Gregory of Tours in his Historia Francorum. The book was a history of the Franks written in the second half of the 6th century, more than 75 years after the events took place. Because of this report, the course of the civil war can be reconstructed in broad outlines. However, Gregory's account the Burgundians negative in respect of the Franks and has the disadvantage that it contradicts other contemporary sources in some parts. The chronicle of Marius of Avenches provides important additional information and dates the civil war to the year 500. In addition to the accounts of Gregory of Tours and Marius of Avenches, the letters of Avitus of Vienne are also of importance to recount this civil war.

== Background ==
The cause for this war must be sought in the succession problems after the death of Gundioc who, together with his brother Chilperic I had a power base in Gallia Lugdunensis I. Chilperic, rather than Gundioc's sons continued the kingship over the Burgundian people. Gundioc's sons played a prominent role in the late Roman army. Of them, Gundobad in Italy reached the position of magister militum praesentalis, commander-in-chief of the army. Unfortunately, Gregory of Tours' story about the beginning of the events is unreliable. He puts Gundobad in an evil light and blames him for the death of his brothers Gundomar and Chilperic II. This could be to respect Clovis. Recent research believes that Gundomar and Chilperic II had already been dead when Chilperic I died in 480 and Godegisel and Gundobad shared the rule. Political unrest and dissatisfaction with the territorial division may have been a powerful driver for rivalry between the remaining brothers and this eventually led to the conflict.

== Conflict ==
=== Frankish intervention ===
Gundobad ruled most of the Burgundian territory with residences in Lyon and Vienne, while his brother Godegisel controlled a smaller area with his capital in Geneva. According to Gregory of Tours, Godegisel was dissatisfied with this, and secretly asked the Frankish king Clovis for support against his more powerful brother. In return, Clovis promised him estimates and transfer of territories in case of success. Together they plotted a plan to bring down Gundobad. In this plan, Godegisel remained friends with his brother so as not to arouse suspicion. In 500 CE, Clovis and his army attacked Gundobad on his territory, after which Gundobad turned to his brother for help. Then the two brothers' armies marched together against the invaders. However, when the three armies met near Dijon, the troops of Godegisel joined the army of the opponent and his brother had to defend himself alone.

=== Battle of Dijon ===
In the ensuing battle, the united armies of Clovis and Godegisel defeated Gundobad, who fled to Avignon in the far south of his empire. According to the chronicler Marius of Avenches, this battle took place at Dijon in the year 500. After the battle, Godegisel was satisfied with his success and considered himself the only king of the kingdom. He then went triumphantly to Vienne.

=== Siege of Avignon ===
Despite the fact that Gundobad had fled to Avignon, the war had not yet been settled. Clovis marched alone to Avignon to capture Gundobad. The siege of Avignon lasted a long time. The siege ended when Aridius, a general and a Roman magistrate, managed to convince Clovis that the city could not be taken. Then Clovis reconciled with Gundobad, who agreed to pay annual tribute to Clovis.

=== Gundobad's counterattack ===
Gundobad searched for a way to get rid of the unfavorable peace with Clovis and found it with the Aquitanian Goths who had been in war with the Franks three years earlier. Gundobad made an alliance with the Gothic rex Alaric II in 501. Assured of his support, he stopped paying the annual tribute and attacked his brother by besieging him in the city of Vienne. After the city capitulated, Gundobad executed Godegisel and many of his Burgundian followers, and thus re-established himself as the king of the Burgundians.

== Aftermath ==
After the war, Gundobad donated Avignon to the Goths and sent him the Frankish prisoners of war. Alaric then visited Clovis near the village Amboise, where Alaric agreed to release the prisoners, while Clovis returned all the Gothic territory he still had in his hands. Gundobad may also be involved in this peace, which lasted only a few years until the Franco-Gothic War. In the Franco-Gothic War which broke out in 507, Gundobad was an ally of Clovis.

== Bibliography ==
- Kaiser, Reinhold (2004). Die Burgunder. Universiteit Stuttgart.
- Mathisen, Ralph W.; Shanzer, Danuta (2012). The Battle of Vouillé, 507 CE: Where France Began (PDF). Millennium-Studien / Millennium Studies. Vol. 37. Berlin & New York: De Gruyter. p. 3. doi:10.1515/9781614510994. ISBN 9781614510994. LCCN 2021758920 – via OAPEN Library.
- Wolfram, Herwig (1988). History of the Goths. Berkeley: University of California Press. ISBN 978-0-52005-259-8. California

== Sources ==
- Gregory of Tours, History of the Franks
- Marius of Avenches, Cronicle
- Avitus of Vienne, Letters
