= Ibbas =

Ostrogothic general

The Frankish campaigns in Aquitaine (507–509).

Ibbas, also referred to as Ibba, Hibba, or Hibbas, was an Ostrogothic military officer who served his people during the reign of Theodoric the Great in Italy (493–526).

== Biography ==
Ibbas, described in the sources as both comes and dux, was sent by Theodoric to the aid of the Visigoths, who had been defeated by the Franks at the Battle of Vouillé and deprived of their king Alaric, who had been killed in combat against Clovis (507).

In 508, he entered Provence at the head of an army and distinguished himself against the troops of Clovis, who sought to extend his dominion towards the Mediterranean coast with the collaboration of the Burgundians of King Gundobad. After intense fighting, Ibbas lifted the siege of Arles by the Franks and Burgundians and seized Nîmes and Narbonne in 509, while Ostrogothic reinforcements led by Duke Mammo ravaged Orange and Valence and drove the Burgundians back to the north. Finally, in 510, Ibbas liberated Carcassonne. According to the contemporary historian Jordanes, probably not very objective because of his Gothic origins, Ibba's campaigns resulted in the deaths of 30,000 Frankish warriors.

Having thus saved the Visigothic kingdom from disappearing as a state, Ibbas turned against an illegitimate son of King Alaric, Gesalec, whom the remnants of the Visigothic army had acclaimed as their monarch. Overthrown by the Ostrogoths, Gesalec had to seek refuge at the court of the Vandal king Thrasamund in Carthage, before organizing an invasion of Hispania from Gaul to reclaim his throne. Entering through Tarraconensis, Gesalec was defeated by Ibbas' forces at the Battle of Barcelona, after which he fled north through Narbonensis to seek Burgundian support, but was captured and killed while crossing the Durance River in 514, probably by Ostrogothic soldiers (512). Ibbas had been the architect of the coronation in 511 of the young prince Amalaric, about five years old, as Visigoth king under Ostrogothic tutelage, ensuring that until 526, Ostrogoths and Visigoths were once again united under the effective command of a single ruler: Theodoric the Great.

According to the British philologist Henry Bradley, Ibbas was Catholic, and not Arian like most Goths of that time.

== Bibliography ==
- Jordanes (2001). Origen y gestas de los godos (in Spanish). Madrid: Ediciones Cátedra. ISBN 84-376-1887-8.
- Rouche, Michel (1996). Clovis: suivi de vingt et un documents traduits et commentés (in French). Paris: Fayard. ISBN 2-2135-9632-8.
- Hodgkin, Thomas (1885). "Chapter IX: Theodoric's relations with Gaul". Italy and her invaders, 476-535. Vol. Book IV: the Ostrogothic invasion. Oxford: Clarendon Press. ISBN 1293151637.
- Esparza Torres, José Javier (16 October 2018). Visigodos: La verdadera historia de la primera España (in Spanish). La Esfera de los Libros. ISBN 978-84-9164-446-0.
- Strauss, G.L.M. (5 September 2023). Moslem and Frank. BoD – Books on Demand. ISBN 978-3-368-92371-6.
- Barnish, S. J- B.; Marazzi, Federico (2007). The Ostrogoths from the Migration Period to the Sixth Century: An Ethnographic Perspective. Boydell & Brewer. ISBN 978-1-84383-074-0.
- Maunder, Samuel (1862). The Biographical Treasury: A Dictionary of Universal Biography. Longman, Green, Longman, and Roberts.
- Jeanroy, Alfred (2003). Annales du Midi (in French). University of Michigan: E. Privat.
- Vega, Gonzalo Balderas (14 May 2020). Historia de la Iglesia en México.: Antecedentes Ibéricos. Tomo I / Volumen 2 (in Spanish). Universidad Iberoamericana A.C. ISBN 978-607-417-674-2.
- Demougeot, Emilienne (1979). La formation de l'Europe et les invasions barbares (in French). Aubier. ISBN 978-2-7007-0146-3.
- Perry, Walter Copland (1857). The Franks, from Their First Appearance in History to the Death of King Pepin. Longman, Brown, Green, Longmans, and Roberts.
- Arnold, Jonathan J. (24 February 2014). Theoderic and the Roman Imperial Restoration. Cambridge University Press. ISBN 978-1-107-72987-2.
- Arnold, Jonathan J. (2008). Theoderic, the Goths, and the Restoration of the Roman Empire (Thesis). Ann Arbor: University of Michigan.
- Livermore, Harold (2006). Twilight of the Goths. Bristol: Intellect Books. ISBN 1841509663.
- Bradley, Henry (1888). The Goths from the Earliest Times to the End of the Gottic Dominion in Spain. Bibliothèque jésuite des Fontaines.
