= Siege of Arles (507–508) =

Frankish–Burgundian attack on Arles

- Part of Franco–Gothic War
Date	Autumn 507 – 508
Location	Arles, Visigoth Kingdom (present-day France)
Result	Gothic victory

Belligerents
Visigothic Kingdom; Ostrogothic Kingdom	Frankish Kingdom; Kingdom of the Burgundians

Commanders and leaders
Ibbas; Tuluin	Clovis I

Strength
Unknown	Unknown

Casualties and losses
Unknown	30,000 (exaggerated)

The siege of Arles between 507 and 508 was a battle between the Franks and Burgundians, who wanted to occupy Provence, and the Visigothic Kingdom, who had the support of the Ostrogothic Kingdom.

== Background ==
After the Fall of the Western Roman Empire, the Franks created their own kingdom under the Merovingian dynasty, and wanted to expel the Visigoths from Gaul for their Arianism. Aided by the Catholic clergy and the Gallic populations dominated by the Arian Visigoths and Burgundians, Clovis I decided to attack the Kingdom of the Burgundians in 500.

After the severe defeat at the Battle of Dijon, Gundobad left the city and fled south, pursued by Clovis and Godegisel, leaving Lyon and Vienne to Clovis. He finally waited for him at Avignon, where he was besieged and signed peace in return for paying tribute and yielding Vienne to his brother. But he was finally defeated and killed by his rival, when he attacked the capital in 502.

== Siege ==
Probably in the autumn of 507, when returning from the campaign in Septimania, the city was besieged by a coalition of Burgundians reinforced by Franks, but far from welcoming these invaders, the city defended itself against the attacks with great energy.

Fearful that the instability in Gaul would spread to Italy, Theodoric the Great sent an army commanded by Ibbas, which set out for Provence on 24 June 508 to secure the border east of the Rhone and the south of the Durance.

A vigorous action by General Tuluin repelled the attackers on the right bank and allowed the control of the Bridge of Constantine, which connects the city with the island of Camargue, to the north of the city, at the foot of the walls. The Frankish and Burgundian troops raised the siege with a great defeat. According to Jordanes, they lost 30,000 soldiers but this seems exaggerated. The Ostrogoths returned to the city and brought a huge number of prisoners who filled the basilica and even the bishop's house. Caesarius of Arles had to melt the silver of the church to free the captives.

== Aftermath ==
Theodoric the Great supported Amalaric as king of the Visigoths, and sent Ibbas to fight Gesalec, taking Carcassonne and Narbonne in 509, forcing him to take refuge in Barcelona, where he was attacked and deposed in 510.

== Bibliography ==
- Tours, Gregory of (591). Historia Francorum. Vol. 2.
- Strauss, Gustave Louis M. (1854). Moslem and Frank; or, Charles Martel and the rescue of Europe.
- Mathisen, Ralph W. (2012). The Battle of Vouille, 507 CE: Where France Began. Walter de Gruyter. p. 126. ISBN 978-1614511274.
- Klingshirn, William E. (1994). Caesarius of Arles: The Making of a Christian Community in Late Antique Gaul. Cambridge University Press. ISBN 978-0-521-52852-8.
- Malnory, Arthur (1894). Saint Césaire, évêque d'Arles: 503-543 (in French).
- Arnold, Jonathan J. (2008). Theoderic, the Goths, and the Restoration of the Roman Empire (in French). p. 248. ISBN 978-0549818021.
