= Peter (usurper) =

6th century Roman usurper

Peter (Latin: Petrus) was a Roman usurper of the early 6th century, recorded in two minor sources: the Consularia Caesaraugustana and the Victoris Tunnunnensis Chronicon. He was a "tyrant" (meaning usurper) against the Visigothic rulers of Spain. When the Visigoths captured the city of Dertosa in 506, he was arrested and executed, with his head being sent as a trophy to Zaragoza. Nothing else is known about him, but he seems to be the second Roman governor (after Burdunellus) to try to claim imperial authority in the Ebro valley of Spain after the fall of the Western Roman Empire.
