= Theodegotha =

Visigoth queen consort

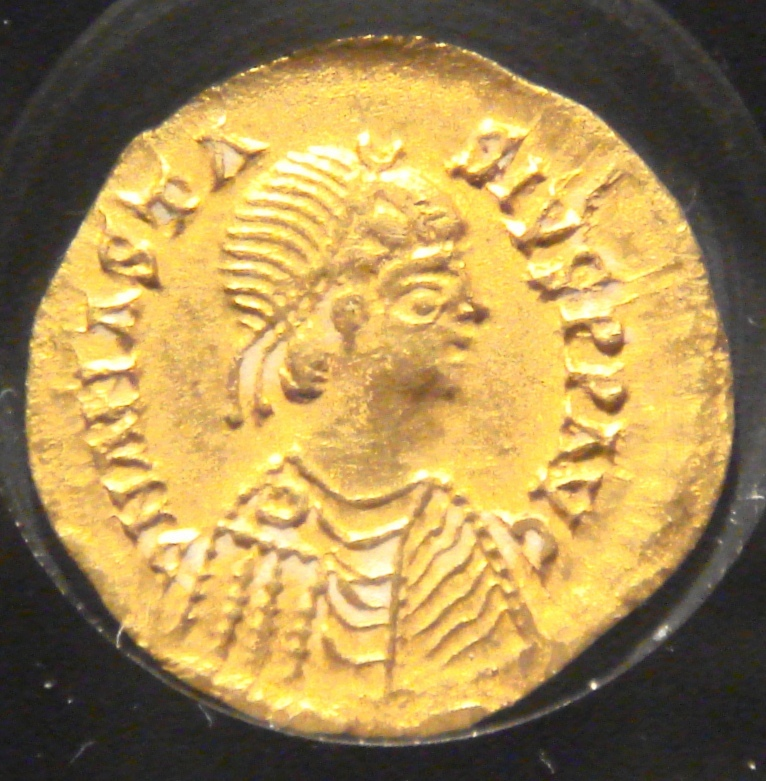
Coin featuring Alaric II

Theodegotha (Gothic: 𐌸𐌹𐌿𐌳𐌹𐌲𐍉𐍄𐍉, romanized: þiudigōtō, lit. 'good people'; 5th century – fl. 502) was a Visigoth queen consort by marriage to king Alaric II (494–507). She was the daughter of Theodoric the Great.

== Life ==
Her marriage was arranged as an alliance between the Visigoths (Alaric's people) and the Ostrogoths (her father's people), though it is disputed when it took place and therefore the exact reasons for the alliance. Nonetheless, some suggest that the marriage likely took place shortly after Alaric II took the throne in 493 CE. She was the mother of Amalaric.
