= De fisco Barcinonensi =

De fisco Barcinonensi ("Concerning the Barcelonian Fisc") is a letter (epistola) from a group of bishops in the province of Tarraconensis in the Visigothic Kingdom to the treasury agents in Barcelona. The letter reminds the officials of the fixed rate of public tribute and demands that exactions in excess of that amount should stop. In the manuscripts, De fisco is preserved after the acts of the Council of Barcelona of 540, but its signatories are mostly those of the acts of the Council of Zaragoza of 592. Most scholars believe it should be dated in connexion with the latter council. The bishops describe themselves as "all [those] who contribute to the fisc of the city of Barcelona", but the bishop of Barcelona, Ugnas, did not sign. The location of the regional fiscal administration in Barcelona perhaps explains why that city survived the Islamic conquest better than the provincial capital, Tarragona.

The Epistola de fisco Barcinonensi is an important source on tax collection in the Visigothic period. It is addressed to the "accountants" (numerarii) whose job it was to collect the tax, and who were appointed for one-year terms by the local "count of the patrimony" (comes patrimonii)—at the time a certain Scipio—and the bishops (episcopi). The involvement of the bishops was, according to their letter, "by custom" (sicut consuetudo). This custom had been formalised by the Third Council of Toledo in 589, which mandated annual provincial councils of bishops and fiscal agents (actores fiscalium patrimoniorum) so that the latter would be just in their dealings with the people. The circumstances and tenor of the letter strongly suggest that the tax was levied on the entire rate-paying (predominantly Roman) population of the province, while the "patrimonial" nature of the levy indicates that it went to the royal treasury. It may be a relict of the one third of land, in the form of land taxes, that went to the Visigothic king at the time of the conquest, while the remaining two thirds went to his followers.

The going tax rate in Barcelona in the 590s was fourteen siliquae (or 7/12 solidus) per modius of barley. It is impossible to convert this rate into a percentage, since the value of a modius cannot be stated with precision, and it probably represented a unit of land that could produce a certain amount of barley. Unless the modius was a great deal larger than that of earlier times, the tax rate was comparable to that under the Romans.

== Editions ==
- Vives, José S.; Marín Martínez, Tomás; Martínez Díez, Gonzalo (1963). Concilios visigóticos e hispano-romanos. España Cristiana. Vol. 1. Instituto Enrique Flórez. p. 54.

== Sources ==
- Hendy, Michael F. (1988). "From Public to Private: The Western Barbarian Coinages as a Mirror of the Disintegration of Late Roman State Structures". Viator. 19: 29–78. doi:10.1484/J.VIATOR.2.301364.
- Retamero, Félix (1999). "As Coins Go Home: Towns, Merchants, Bishops and Kings in Visigothic Hispania". In Heather, Peter (ed.). The Visigoths from the Migration Period to the Seventh Century: An Ethnographic Perspective. Boydell Press. pp. 271–304.
- Stocking, Rachel L. (2000). Bishops, Councils, and Consensus in the Visigothic Kingdom, 589–633. University of Michigan Press.
- Wickham, Chris (2005). Framing the Early Middle Ages: Europe and the Mediterranean, 400-800. Oxford University Press.
