= Burdunellus =

5th-century Roman usurper

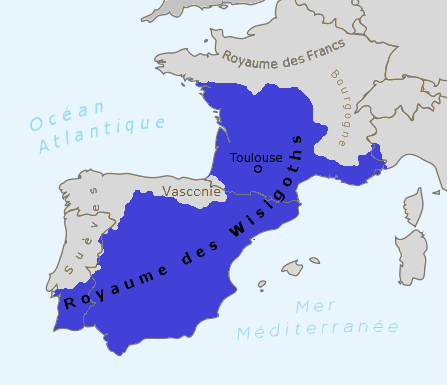

Burdunellus (meaning "little mule", possibly a nickname) was a Roman usurper of the late fifth century AD, recorded only briefly in the Consularia Caesaraugustana. Under 496 it is recorded that "he became a tyrant in Hispania", a phrase which, in the political language of the time and considering the nature of the source, must mean he tried to claim the imperial dignity and authority.

== Political context ==
The appearance of Burudellus and after him Peter, another Hispano-Roman pretender, who was also called tyrannus, suggests that the transition from Roman to Visigothic Spain was much less smooth than is sometimes suggested. Although the elite lost its access to a normal Roman political career, it did not disappear. Their country, wealth and local prestige continued to exist. They were in Spain a factor that the new rulers, the barbarian kings, had to take into account. In this respect, their situation was similar to that in Gaul, about which much more is known through the letters of Sidonius Apollinaris.

Recent research into the aristocracy of the Iberian Peninsula emphasized that local elites continued to play an active role in the new political reality. It is therefore not easy to tell how exactly was represented the rightful power in Hispania. The imperiality in the west had disappeared from 480 and the Visigothic kings now ruled independently, but the relationship with reigning emperor Anastasius (491-515) in Constantinople had not yet disappeared. In addition, the Visigothic influence was superficial and was not recognized everywhere. In this context, Burdunellus was a suitable figure, perhaps because of military capabilities, to claim Roman legitimacy. A parallel with Syagrius who had a power base in North Gaul seems appropriate here.

== Rise and fall ==
Both Isidor of Seville and the Consularia Caesaraugustana state that the army of the Visigothic king Euric (466-484) was directed against the Hispano-Roman elite and that it was inflicted a heavy loss. According to Arce, the impact of these aggressive interventions by Eurics' troops was such that this led to a reaction from the Roman upper class during the reign of Alaric II. Part of the society in Tarraconensis did not accept Visigothic rule and preferred to remain loyal to the Roman Empire. Burdunellus' proclamation as emperor fits into this. Initially, he did not act alone and could count on the support of others. This points to a regional elite that had sufficient resources to actually resist a Visigothic army. Despite this, Burdunellus did not enjoy the unconditional support of his followers. When it became clear that his usurpation offered no choice for a successful change of power, they turned against him.

Burdunellus was eventually abandoned by his own supporters, who turned him over to Visigothic authorities and sent him to Tolosa, where he was burned to death inside a bronze bull, an unusual fate for a usurper but designed to humiliate. The location of Burdunellus' petty government is unknown, but was probably the valley of the Ebro centred on Caesaraugusta.

== See also ==
- Peter (usurper)

== Sources ==
- Arce, Javier (2020), The Visigoths in Hispania: New perspectivites on arrival and settlement, Amsterdam University Press
- Collins, Roger. Visigothic Spain, 409–711. Oxford: Blackwell Publishing, 2004. ISBN 0-631-18185-7.
- Fernandez, Damian (2019), Aristocrats and Statehood in Western Iberia, 300-600 C.E., University of Pennsylvania Press
- Thompson, E. A. "The End of Roman Spain: Part III." Nottingham Mediaeval Studies, xxii (1978), pp. 3–22. Reprinted as "The Gothic Kingdom and the Dark Age of Spain" in Romans and Barbarians: The Decline of the Western Empire. Madison: University of Wisconsin Press, 1982. pp. 161–187. ISBN 0-299-08700-X.
