= Consularia Caesaraugustana =

The Consularia Caesaraugustana is a chronicle from late antiquity covering the period 450-568. It is fragmentary handed down as an addition in the margins of a manuscript by Victor of Tunnuna and John of Biclar. They may have originally covered a longer period of time. It is the last attested example of the genre of consulars. The work was attributed by Mommsen (1894) to Maximus of Zaragoza. Caesar Augusta was the Roman name of Zaragoza.

== Sources ==
- Late Antique Historiography at University of Ghent
