= Amalaric =

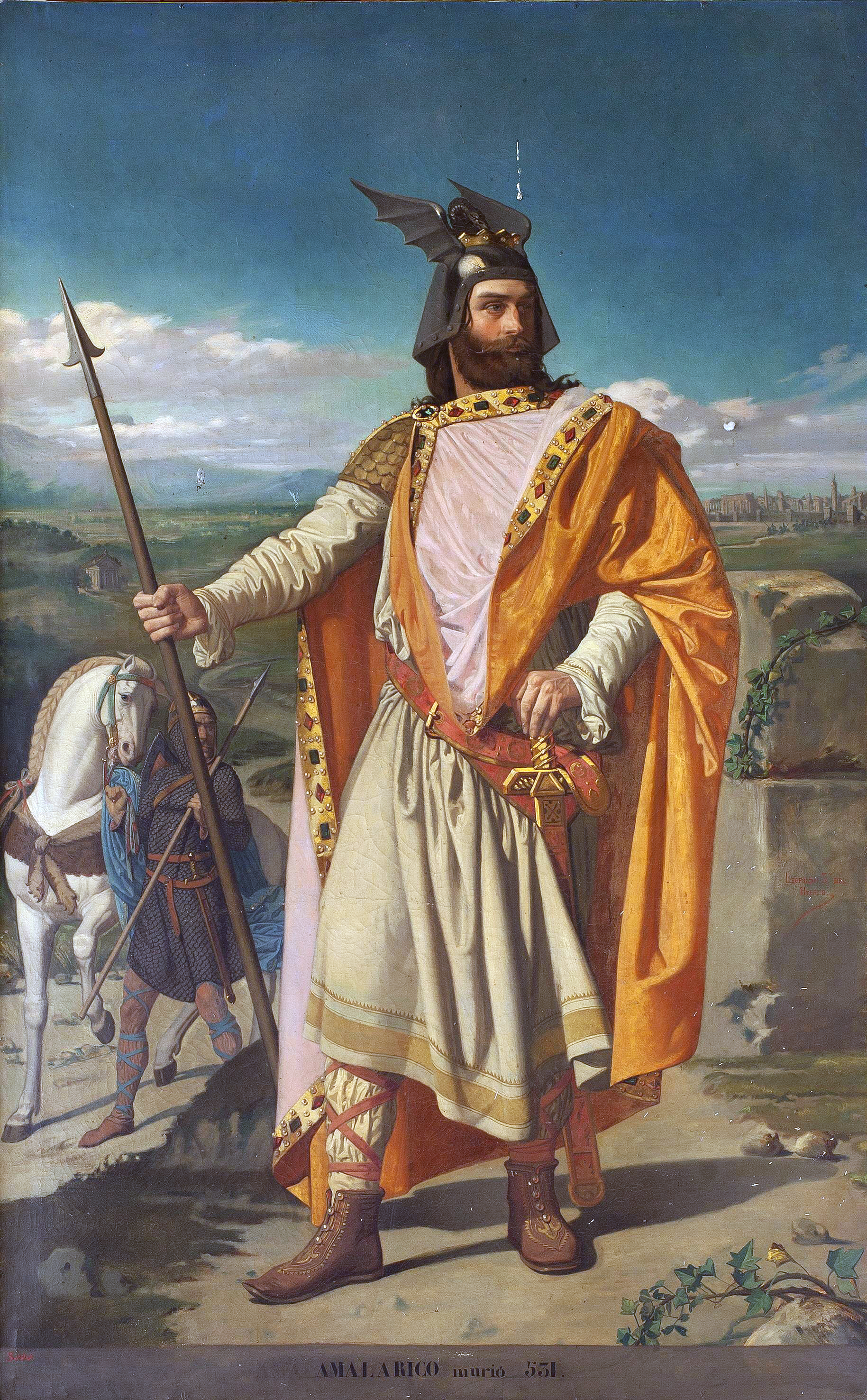
- Posthumous portrait of Amalaric painted in 1855

King of the Visigoths
- Reign: 522 – 531
- Predecessor: Gesalec
- Successor: Theudis
- Born: c. 502
- Died: c. 531 (29 years)
- Spouse: Chrotilda
- Father: Alaric II
- Mother: Theodegotha
- Religion: later Arianism

Amalaric (reconstructed Gothic: *𐌰𐌼𐌰𐌻𐌰𐍂𐌴𐌹𐌺𐍃, *Amalareiks; Spanish and Portuguese: Amalarico; c. 502–531) was king of the Visigoths from 522 until his assassination. He was a son of king Alaric II and his first wife Theodegotha, daughter of Theodoric the Great.

== Biography ==
When Alaric II was killed while fighting Clovis I, king of the Franks, in the Battle of Vouillé (507), his kingdom fell into disarray. "More serious than the destruction of the Gothic army," writes Herwig Wolfram, "than the loss of both Aquitanian provinces and the capital of Toulose, was the death of the king." Alaric had made no provision for a successor, and although he had two sons, one was of age but illegitimate and the other, Amalaric, the offspring of a legal marriage but still a child. Amalaric was carried for safety into Spain, which country and Provence were thenceforth ruled by his maternal grandfather, Theodoric the Great, acting through his vice-regent, an Ostrogothic nobleman named Theudis. The older son, Gesalec, was chosen as king but his reign was disastrous. King Theodoric of the Ostrogoths sent an army, led by his sword-bearer Theudis, against Gesalec, ostensibly on behalf of Amalaric; Gesalec fled to Africa. The Ostrogoths then drove back the Franks and their Burgundian allies, regaining possession of "the south of Novempopulana, Rodez, probably even Albi, and even Toulose". Following the 511 death of Clovis, Theodoric negotiated a peace with Clovis' successors, securing Visigothic control of the southernmost portion of Gaul for the rest of the existence of their kingdom.

In 522, the young Amalaric was proclaimed king, and four years later, on Theodoric's death, he assumed full royal power, although relinquishing Provence to his cousin Athalaric. His kingdom was faced with a Frankish threat from the north; according to Peter Heather, this was his motivation for marrying Chrotilda, the daughter of Clovis. However, this was not successful, for according to Gregory of Tours, Amalaric pressured her to forsake Orthodoxy and convert to Arian Christianity, at one point beating her until she bled; she sent to her brother Childebert I, king of Paris, a towel stained with her own blood. Ian Wood noted that although Gregory provides the fullest information for this period, where it touches Merovingian affairs, he often "allowed his religious bias to determine his interpretation of the events." Peter Heather agrees with Wood's implication in this instance: "I doubt that this is the full story, but the effects of Frankish intervention are clear enough."

Childebert defeated the Visigothic army and took Narbonne. Amalaric fled south to Barcelona, where according to Isidore of Seville, he was assassinated by his own men. According to Peter Heather, Theodoric's former governor Theudis was implicated in Amalaric's murder, "and was certainly its prime beneficiary." As for Chrotilda, in Gregory's words, she died on the journey home "by some ill chance". Childebert had her body brought to Paris where she was buried alongside her father Clovis.

== Notes ==
King Amalaric of the Visigoths Balti dynasty Died: 531
Regnal titles
Preceded by Gesalec	King of the Visigoths; 522–531 with Theodoric III (522–526)	Succeeded by Theudis
