= Gesalec =

Visigothic King

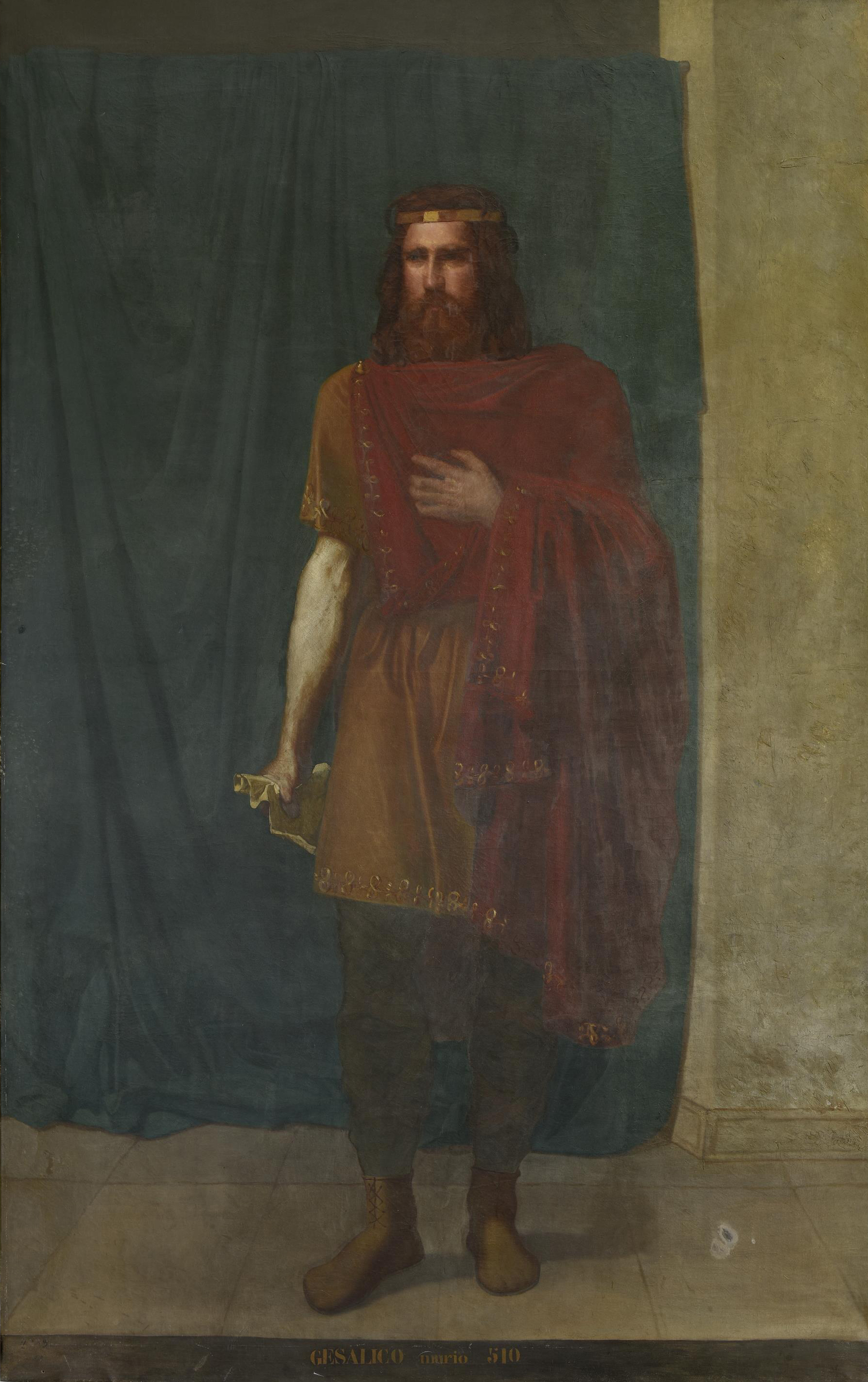
- Posthumous portrait of Gesalec painted in 1855

King of the Visigoths
- Reign: c. August 507 – 511
- Predecessor: Alaric II
- Successor: Theodoric the Great
- Born: c. 480
- Died: c. 513 (aged 33)
- Father: Alaric II
- Religion: Arian Christianity

Gesalic (Gothic: *𐌲𐌰𐌹𐍃𐌰𐌻𐌰𐌹𐌺𐍃, romanized: Gaisalaiks, lit. 'dancing with spears'; Latin: Gesaleicus; Spanish and Portuguese: Gesaleico; Catalan: Gesaleic; c. 480 – 513) was a king of the Visigoths from 507 to 511, and died in 513.

== Biography ==
Although the illegitimate son of Alaric II, he had been elected king by the Visigoths after Alaric had been killed in battle by the Franks. Alaric's only legitimate son, Amalaric, was a child and too young to rule.

Initially Gesalec was supported by the powerful Ostrogothic king Theodoric the Great, but this support eventually faded. Between 508 and 511, he had one important Visigothic noble executed - Goiaric. Gesalec's rule was dealt a decisive blow when the Burgundians, led by their king Gundobad, captured and plundered Narbonne, his capital. Gesalec fled to Barcelona, where he remained until Theodoric deposed him. Theodoric took over the rule of the Visigothic kingdom for the next 15 years, collecting its taxes and appointing its officials, ostensibly in the name of Gesalic's half-brother, Amalaric, until he was old enough to rule.

Driven from the throne, Gesalec found a refuge in Carthage from the Vandal king Thrasamund. The Vandal king supported his cause, providing him money but no men, and in 510 and 511 the Vandal navy supported Gesalec's invasion of Spain. However, after receiving some stern letters from Theodoric, Thrasamund recognized he was no match for the Ostrogoths and withdrew his support for Gesalec, offering an apology and gold to Theodoric.

Abandoned by Thrasamund, Gesalec fled to Aquitania, where he remained for a year. Herwig Wolfram notes that although Aquitania had been conquered by the Franks following the Battle of Vouille, it was still thickly populated by Visigoths and pro-Gothic Romans. Gesalec returned once again to Spain, and was defeated by Theodoric's general Ibbas outside of Barcelona, according to Isidore of Seville at the twelfth milestone. Although he escaped from the battlefield, Gesalec was captured after crossing the river Durance and subsequently executed. Wolfram explains that Gesalec had played "his last card, the Burgundians", but in a footnote observes "Isidore does not tell us whether Burgundians or Ostrogothic guards captured and killed the luckless Visigothic king." Peter Heather speculates his execution was "probably in 513."

- Media related to Gesaleico at Wikimedia Commons

== Sources ==
- Peter J. Heather, The Goths, Oxford 1996.
- Robert Kasperski,The Visigothic King Gesalic, Isidore’s Historia Gothorum and the Goths’ Wars against the Franks and the Burgundians in the Years 507–514, „Kwartalnik Historyczny” Vol. CXXIV, 2017 Eng.-Language Edition no. 1, pp. 7–37.
- Herwig Wolfram, History of the Goths, Berkeley 1988.

King Gesalec of the Visigoths Balti dynasty Died: 511
Regnal titles
Preceded by Alaric II	King of the Visigoths; 507–511	Succeeded by Amalaric
