= Battle of Vouillé =

6th-century battle of the Franco-Visigothic Wars

Coordinates: 46.5833°N 0.3333°E

- Part of Franco-Gothic War
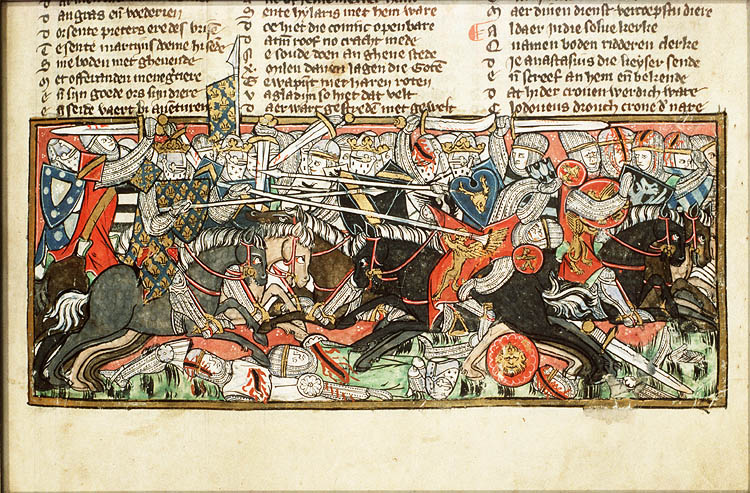
- Battle between Clovis and the Visigoths, 14th century
Date	507
Location	Vouillé, Vienne
Result	Frankish victory
Territorial changes	Frankish conquest of Gallia Aquitania

Belligerents
Franks	Visigothic Kingdom

Commanders and leaders
Clovis I	Alaric II †; Apollinaris of Clermont

The Battle of Vouillé (from Latin Campus Vogladensis) was a battle in the Franco-Gothic War and was fought in the northern marches of Visigothic territory, at Vouillé, near Poitiers (Gaul), around spring 507 between the Franks, commanded by Clovis, and the Visigoths, commanded by Alaric II. The Franks' victory resulted in their conquest of Gallia Aquitania and the death of Alaric II.

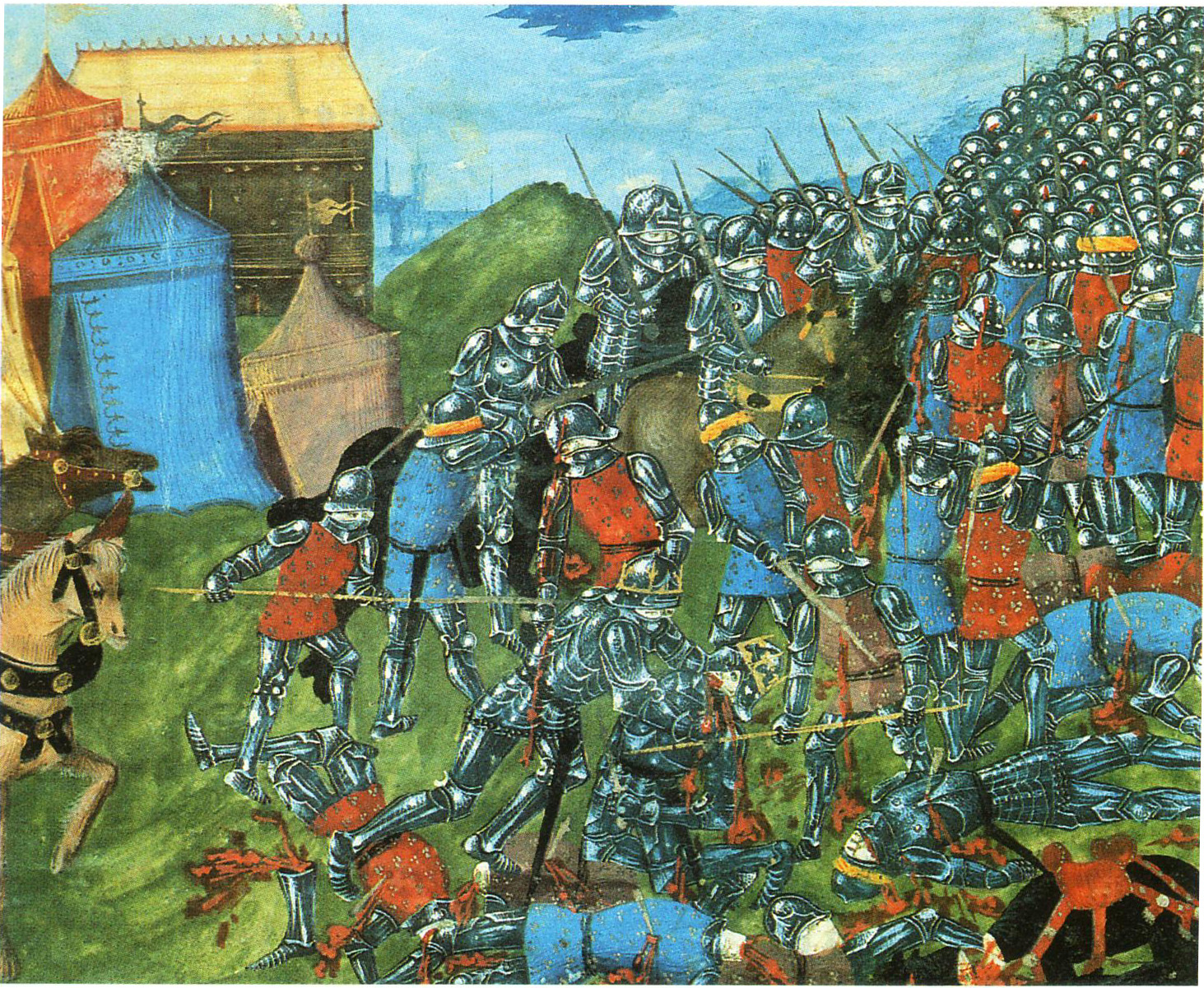
Clovis killing Alaric II at the Battle of Vouillé, 15th century miniature. The weapons and armour here were only developed in the 1400s, thus making them anachronistic.

== Background ==
After Clovis's victories over the Alemanni east of the Rhine and over the Burgundians in the Rhone Valley, the Franks' growing power posed a threat to Alaric II's territory in Aquitaine and Hispania. Despite Theodoric the Great's attempts to broker a peace between the factions, Clovis began a campaign to seize Aquitaine and Alaric's center of power in Toulouse. Alaric, his army, and a force of Auvergnants militia commanded by Apollinaris of Clermont marched north and met the Frankish army in Gaul.

== Battle ==
Clovis's army was slowed by a rain-swollen Vienne River, yet his forces were able to engage the Visigoths south of Vouillé. With his missile troops stationed at the rear of his army, Clovis sent the rest of the army forward to fight hand-to-hand with the Visigoths. Despite being in a superior army in size and equipment, Alaric's soldiers wavered as all of the Auvergnat commanders except Apollinaris were killed. During the melée Clovis allegedly killed the Visigothic king Alaric, whereupon the Visigothic army broke and fled. Clovis's army proceeded south and plundered Alaric's treasure at Toulouse.

== Aftermath ==
After Clovis's success in this battle, Byzantine Emperor Anastasius made him an honorary consul and patrician. The battle forced the Visigoths to retreat to Septimania, which they continued to hold, and the Franks' success at Vouillé allowed them to control the southwestern part of France and to capture Toulouse. Alaric's illegitimate son Gesalec tried to organise a counterstrike at Narbonne, but he was deposed and ultimately killed when Narbonne was taken by Burgundian allies of the Franks. Clovis eventually drove the Goths out of Angoulême and his son, Theuderic I, defeated the Goths in Hispania.

== Literature ==
- Eugen Ewig: Die Merowinger und das Frankenreich, Stuttgart u.a. 1993.
- Herwig Wolfram: Die Goten, München 2001.
