= Alaric II =

King of the Visigoths from 484 until 507

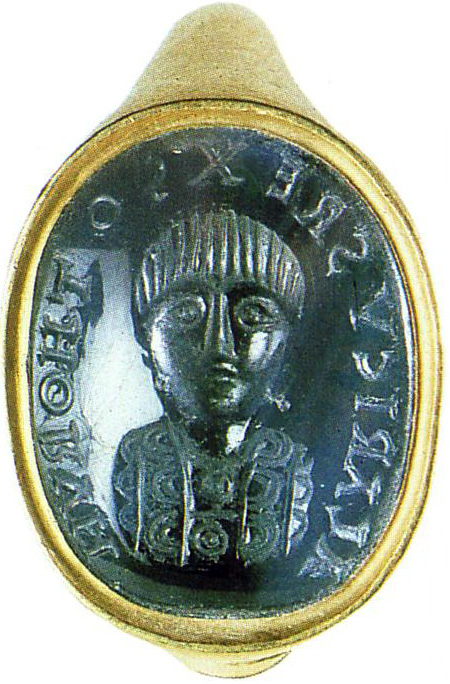
- A ring depicting Alaric II

King of the Visigoths
- Reign: 28 December 484 – c. August 507
- Predecessor: Euric
- Successor: Gesalec
- Born: c. 458–466
- Died: c. August 507 (aged 41/49)
- Spouse: Unknown; Theodegotha
- Issue: Gesalec; Amalaric
- Father: Euric
- Mother: Ragnagild
- Religion: Arian Christianity

Alaric II (reconstructed Gothic: *𐌰𐌻𐌰𐍂𐌴𐌹𐌺𐍃, romanized: *Alarīks, lit. 'ruler of all'; Latin: Alaricus; c. 458/466 – August 507) was the King of the Visigoths from 484 until his death. He succeeded his father Euric as King of the Visigoths in Toulouse on 28 December 484; he was the great-grandson of the more famous Alaric I, who sacked Rome in 410. He established his capital at Aire-sur-l'Adour (Vicus Julii) in Aquitaine. His dominions included not only the majority of Hispania but also Gallia Aquitania and the greater part of Gallia Narbonensis.

== Reign ==
Herwig Wolfram opens his chapter on the eighth Visigothic king, "Alaric's reign gets no full treatment in the sources, and the little they do contain is overshadowed by his death in the Battle of Vouillé and the downfall of the Toulosan kingdom." One example is Isidore of Seville's account of Alaric's reign which consists of a single paragraph primarily about Alaric's death in that battle.

The earliest-documented event in Alaric's reign concerned providing refuge to Syagrius, the former ruler of the Domain of Soissons who had been defeated by Clovis I, King of the Franks. According to Gregory of Tours's account, Alaric was intimidated by Clovis into surrendering Syagrius to the Franks who imprisoned Syagrius and, once Clovis's control over the Domain of Soissons was secure, Clovis had him executed. However, Wolfram points out that at the time "Clovis got no farther than the Seine; only after several more years did the Franks succeed in occupying the rest of the Gallo-Roman buffer state north of the Loire."

Despite Frankish advances in the years that followed, Alaric was not afraid to take the military initiative when it presented itself. In 490, Alaric assisted his fellow Gothic king, Theodoric the Great, in his conquest of Italy by dispatching an army to raise Odoacer's siege of Pavia, where Theodoric had been trapped. About 495 it came clear that the Gothic rule of the Spanish part was not deeply established. The peninsula was home to many autonomous players, such as the major cities and communities like the Suevens and Basques. In the uprising of Burdunellus, a military campaign had to be sent south to maintain local control, Alaric himself came in action. In Caesaraugusta, where Burdunellus had proclaimed Roman authority emperor his uprising was successfully repressed in 496.

Then, when the Franks attacked the Burgundians in the decade after 500, Alaric assisted the ruling house. According to Wolfram the victorious Burgundian king Gundobad ceded Avignon to Alaric. By 502 Clovis and Alaric met on an island in the Loire near Amboise for face-to-face talks, which led to a peace treaty.

In 506, the Visigoths captured the city of Dertosa in the Ebro valley. There they captured the Roman usurper Peter and had him executed.

== Battle of Vouillé and aftermath ==
The Kingdom of the Visigoths under Alaric II

After a few years, however, Clovis violated the peace treaty negotiated in 502. Despite the diplomatic intervention of Theodoric, king of the Ostrogoths and father-in-law of Alaric, Clovis led his followers into Visigothic territory. Alaric was forced by his magnates to meet Clovis in the Battle of Vouillé (summer 507) near Poitiers; there the Goths were defeated and, according to Gregory of Tours, Alaric was slain by Clovis himself.

The most serious consequence of this battle was not the loss of their possessions in Gaul to the Franks; with Ostrogothic help, much of the Gallic territory was recovered, Wolfram notes, perhaps as far as Toulouse. Nor was it the loss of the royal treasury at Toulouse, which Gregory of Tours writes Clovis took into his possession. As Peter Heather notes, the Visigothic kingdom was thrown into disarray "by the death of its king in battle". Alaric's heirs were his eldest son, the illegitimate Gesalec, and his younger son, the legitimate Amalaric, who was still a child. Gesalec proved incompetent, and in 511 King Theodoric assumed the throne of the kingdom ostensibly on behalf of Amalaric—Heather uses the word "hijacked" to describe his action. Although Amalaric eventually became king in his own right, the political continuity of the Visigothic kingdom was broken; "Amalaric's succession was the result of new power structures, not old ones," as Heather describes it. With Amalaric's death in 531, the Visigothic kingdom entered an extended period of unrest which lasted until Leovigild assumed the throne in 569.

== Ability as king ==
Alaric was an Arian, like all the early Visigothic nobles, but he greatly mitigated the persecution policy of his father Euric toward the Catholics and authorized them to hold the council of Agde in 506 . He was on uneasy terms with the Catholic bishops of Arelate (modern Arles) as epitomized in the career of the Gallo-Roman Caesarius, bishop of Arles, who was appointed bishop in 503. Caesarius was suspected of conspiring with the Burgundians, whose king had married the sister of Clovis, to assist the Burgundians capture of Arles. Alaric exiled him for a year to Bordeaux in Aquitania, then allowed him to return unharmed when the crisis had passed.

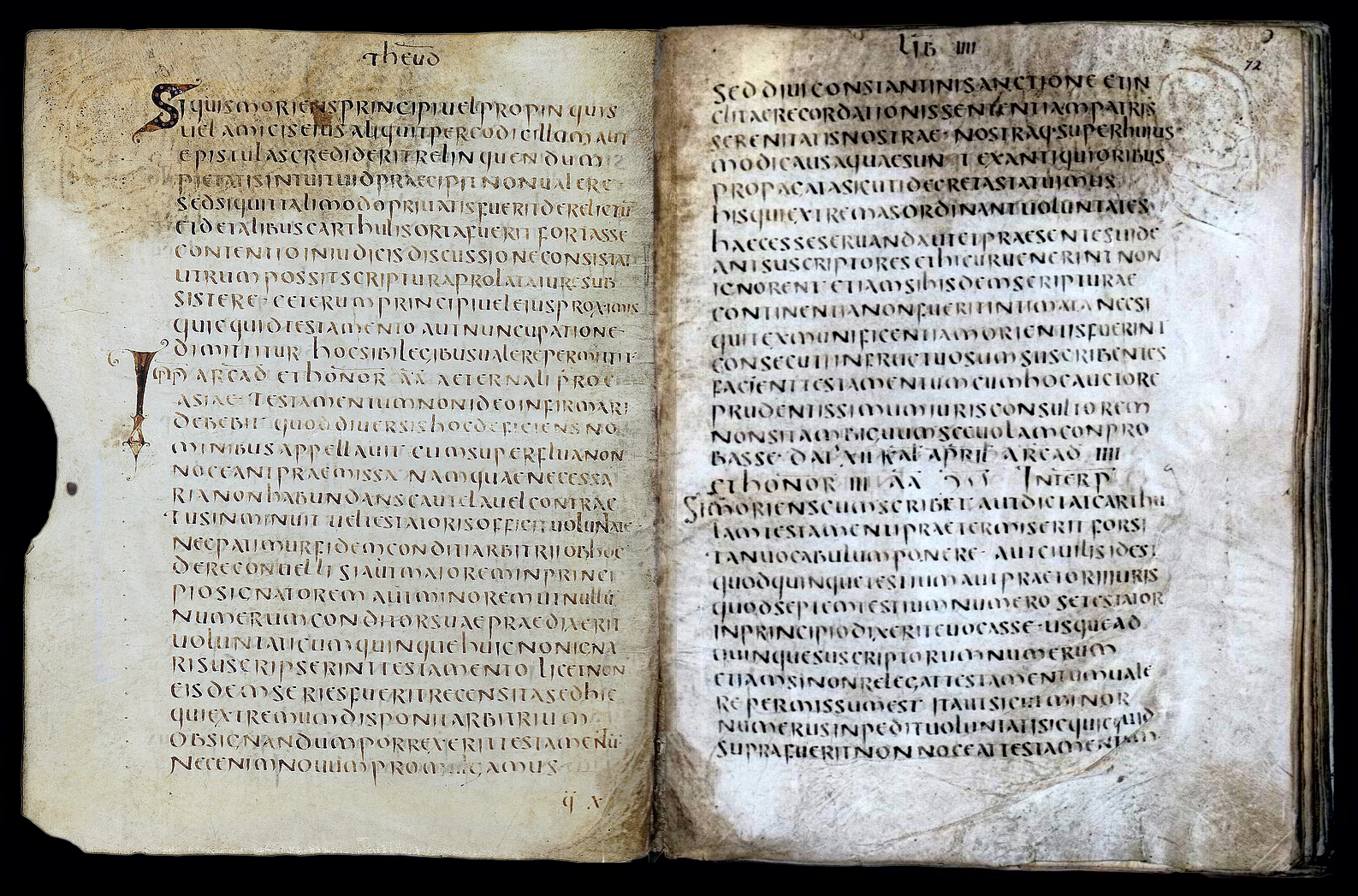
Excerpt from Codex Theodosianus Book IV in the Breviary of Alaric from a 6th-century manuscript.

Alaric displayed similar wisdom in political affairs by appointing a commission headed by the referendary Anianus to prepare an abstract of the Roman laws and imperial decrees, which would form the authoritative code for his Roman subjects. This is generally known as the Breviarium Alaricianum or Breviary of Alaric.

== Legacy ==
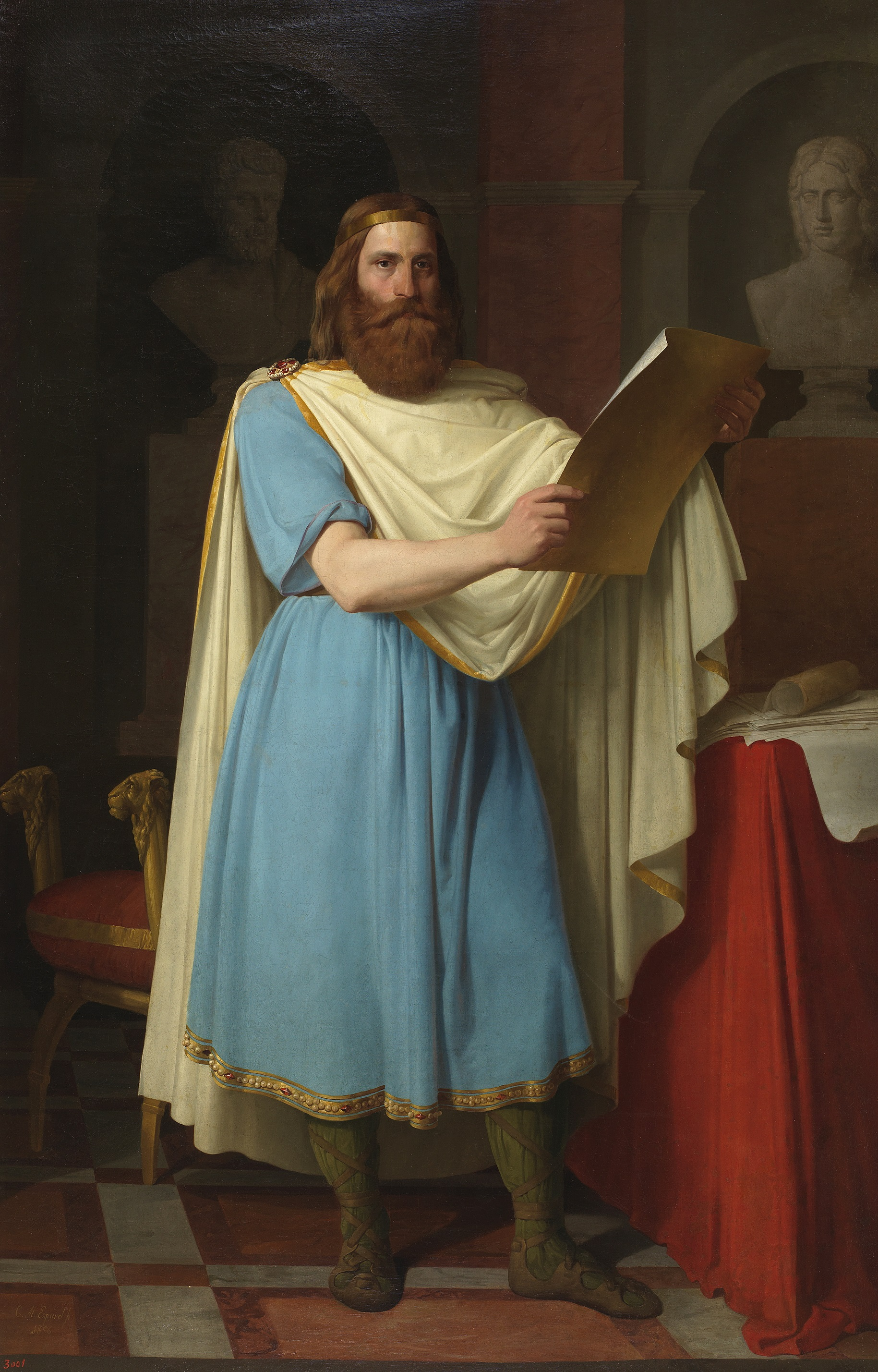
Speculative portrait by Carlos Esquivel y Rivas, 1856

The Montagne d'Alaric (Alaric's Mountain), near Carcassonne, is named after the Visigoth king. Local rumour has it that he left a vast treasure buried in the caves beneath the mountain.

The Canal d'Alaric (Alaric's Canal) in the Hautes-Pyrénées department is named after him.

King Alaric II of the Visigoths Balti dynasty Died: 507
Regnal titles
Preceded by Euric	King of the Visigoths; 28 December 484 – August 507	Succeeded by Gesalec
