= Emperor of Constantinople =

Emperor of Constantinople (Latin: imperator Constantinopolitanus) was one of the standard designations by the Latin-speaking people of medieval Western Europe used for the Byzantine Emperors, whose empire was centered in the city of Constantinople. The emperors themselves used the title Emperor of the Romans (Greek: basileus Rhomaíōn).

The term can refer to:

- the Byzantine Emperors, who ruled in the city from 330 to 1204 and from 1261 to 1453
- the Latin Emperors, who ruled in the city from 1204 to 1261, as well as the later pretenders to this title
- the Ottoman Sultans, who ruled the city from 1453 to 1922, though they were mostly called imperator Turcorum ("emperor of the turks") or simply sultan in western sources.
- Andreas Palaiologos, son of the last Despot of Morea, Thomas Palaiologos, and nephew of the last Byzantine emperor, Constantine XI Palaiologos. Claimant to the throne of the Byzantine Empire.
- Claims by the kings of France to the Byzantine throne, from Charles VIII to Charles IX, after the former purchased the title from Andreas Palaiologos.
