= 520s =

Decade

The 520s decade ran from January 1, 520, to December 31, 529.

== Events ==
=== 520 ===
==== By place ====
====== Byzantine Empire ======
- Priscian, Latin grammarian, writes the Institutiones Grammaticae ("Grammatical Foundations"). In Constantinople, he codifies this manuscript in 18 volumes, which will be widely used through the Middle Ages. It provides the raw material for the field of speculative grammar.
- July – Byzantine general Vitalian becomes consul, and is shortly later murdered, probably on the orders of Justinian, the nephew and heir-apparent of Emperor Justin I.

====== Britannia ======
- King Pabo Post Prydain of the Pennines (Northern England) abdicates his throne, and divides the kingdom between his two sons. He retires, as a hermit, to Anglesey.
- The Kingdom of East Anglia is formed, by the merging of the English counties of Norfolk and Suffolk, and perhaps the eastern part of The Fens (approximate date).
- King Budic II returns to Cornouaille (Brittany), to claim the Breton throne (approximate date).

====== Europe ======
- Ostrogothic ruler Theodoric the Great builds the Mausoleum of Theodoric as his future tomb in Ravenna (Italy).

====== Asia ======
- Bodhidharma, Buddhist monk, arrives in Luoyang. He spreads Buddhism and travels to the northern Chinese kingdom of Wei, to the Shaolin Monastery.

==== By topic ====
====== Religion ======
- February 25 – Epiphanius is elected patriarch of Constantinople by Byzantine Emperor Justin I.
- The construction of the Basilica of San Vitale in Ravenna, is started (approximate date).

=== 521 ===
==== By place ====
====== Byzantine Empire ======
- Future Byzantine emperor Justinian, age 39, is appointed consul. He later becomes Commander-in-chief of the Army of the East.

====== Arabia ======
- Ma`adikarib Ya`fur becomes king, supported by the Aksumites; he begins a military campaign against the Arabian tribes.

==== By topic ====
====== Music ======
- Boethius introduces Greek musical letter notation to the West.

====== Religion ======
- February 22 – Samson of Dol is ordained as bishop in Brittany, on the Feast of the Chair of Saint Peter.
- Ecclesius becomes a bishop of Ravenna.

=== 522 ===
==== By place ====
====== Europe ======
- Anicius Manlius Severinus Boethius, Roman philosopher, is arrested on charges of having conspired against Theodoric the Great. He is imprisoned at Pavia (Lombardy).
- Amalaric, age 20, is proclaimed king of the Visigoths. His kingdom is threatened from the north by the Burgundians.

====== Arabia ======
- Dhu Nuwas seizes the throne of the Himyarite Kingdom in Yemen. He attacks the Aksumite garrison at Zafar, capturing the city and burning the churches.
- Dhū Nuwas moves to Najran, an Aksumite stronghold. After accepting the city's capitulation, he massacres the Christian inhabitants (some sources estimate a death toll up to 20,000).

=== 523 ===
==== By place ====
====== Byzantine Empire ======
- Justinian, later Byzantine emperor, marries in Constantinople his mistress Theodora, who is by profession a courtesan (approximate date).

====== Europe ======
- King Chlothar I takes part in an expedition against Burgundy and captures the town of Autun. Now about 26, he makes plans to expand the territory he inherited from his late father, Clovis I.
- King Sigismund of Burgundy is defeated by the invading Franks under Chlodomer, Childebert I and Chlothar I. He is captured and taken as prisoner to Aurelianum (modern Orléans).

====== Africa ======
- Hilderic succeeds his uncle Thrasamund after a 27-year reign, and becomes king of the Vandals and Alans. He favours Catholicism and grants the inhabitants religious freedom.
- Leptis Magna (modern Libya) is sacked by Berber (Moor) raiders. Gelimer leads a successful expedition in North Africa.

====== Asia ======
- A revolt breaks out on the Six Garrisons, on the northern border of Northern Wei China ("Revolt of the Six Garrisons"). Tensions between the elite and the Tuoba-clan severely destabilise the state.
- The Songyue Pagoda is completed during the Northern Wei era; the circular-based tower is still 40 m (131 ft) in height.
- Seong becomes king of Baekje, one of the Three Kingdoms of Korea.

==== By topic ====
====== Religion ======
- August 6 – Pope Hormisdas dies at Rome after a 9-year reign, in which he has been instrumental in ending the Acacian Schism. He is succeeded by John I as the 53rd pope.

=== 524 ===
==== By place ====
====== Europe ======
- January 1 – Venantius Opilio is appointed by Byzantium's Emperor Justin to administer the Western Roman Empire as the Roman consul, replacing Anicius Maximus. The Emperor Justin appoints himself as consul for the West, an office vacant since 522, but has Theodorus Filoxenus administering the west.
- May 1 – King Sigismund of Burgundy is executed at Orléans after an 8-year reign, and is succeeded by his brother Godomar. He rallies the Burgundian army and begins plundering Frankish territory.
- June 25 – Battle of Vézeronce: The Franks under Chlodomer, Childebert I and Chlothar I are defeated by the Burgundians and allied Ostrogoths near Isère (France), averting the Frankish advance into Burgundy. During the fighting Chlodomer is killed. Later Childebert annexes the cities of Chartres and Orléans.
- October 23 – Anicius Manlius Boethius, one of Rome's most prolific writers and philosophers, is beaten to death at the prison at Pavia, where he has been imprisoned for treason. During his prison sentence, he has written his final work, The Consolation of Philosophy. The date of the death of St. Boethius is later celebrated as his feast day on the Roman Catholic Calendar of Saints.
- Date unknown – Queen Guntheuc, widow of Chlodomer, is forced into marrying his brother, Chlothar I. Her two children are murdered by him, but the eldest son Clodoald survives by escaping to Provence.

====== Central America ======
- November 29 – Ahkal Moʼ Nahb I, ruler of the Maya city of Palenque in what is now the southern Mexican state of Chiapas, dies after a reign of 23 years. The city enters an interregnum which lasts a little over four years.

=== 525 ===
==== By place ====
====== Byzantine Empire ======
- Emperor Justin I rebuilds the city of Anazarbus (modern Turkey) and renames it "Justinopolis".

====== Britannia ======
- Bernicia (North East England) is settled by the Angles (approximate date).

====== Europe ======
- King Theodoric the Great sends Pope John I to Constantinople, to negotiate a withdrawal of Byzantine emperor Justin's edict against Arian Christianity.
- Frankish tribesmen, under the command of King Chlothar I, plunder Burgundy.

====== Africa ======
- Kaleb, king of Aksum, collects a fleet and crosses from Africa to conquer Yemen. He establishes better trade ports on the Red Sea.

====== Asia ======
- The Daisan river, tributary of the Euphrates, floods Edessa, and within a couple of hours fills the entire city except for the highest parts. Eventually the pent-up waters break through the city walls. The Shroud of Turin is allegedly discovered during the rebuilding of the city (see Image of Edessa).

==== By topic ====
====== Exploration and colonization ======
- Cosmas Indicopleustes, Alexandrian explorer-geographer, travels up the Nile. He will venture as far to the east as Ceylon, become a monk, and write "Topographia Christiana" to vindicate the biblical account of the world (see 550).

====== Religion ======
- Dionysius Exiguus, Scythian theologian-mathematician, inaugurates the practice of using A.D. (Anno Domini) in Rome for calendar dates after the birth of Jesus Christ, a system which has been supported by subsequent studies. Dionysius also produces his tables for computing the date of "Cyclus Paschalis" (Easter Tables).
- The Arian baptistery of Santa Maria is built in Ripa (Rome).
- Buddhist caves are completed at Ajanta (India) with stone carvings (approximate date).

=== 526 ===
==== By place ====
====== Europe ======
- August 30 – King Theodoric the Great dies of dysentery at Ravenna; his daughter Amalasuintha takes power as regent for her 10-year-old son Athalaric.
- Amalasuintha rules the Ostrogothic Kingdom that extends throughout the Italian Peninsula, Dalmatia, Sicily, Sardinia and Corsica.
- Amalaric, age 24, becomes king of the Visigoths, and assumes full royal power.

====== Persia ======
- Roman–Persian Wars: King Kavad I, assisted by his Arabian vassal, Al-Mundhir III, begins a campaign in the Transcaucasus region and Upper Mesopotamia.

====== Middle East ======
- Probably between May 20 and May 29 – 526 Antioch earthquake: A great earthquake kills approximately 250,000 people in Syria and Antioch.

==== By topic ====
====== Religion ======
- Pope John I returns to Ravenna from Constantinople. Theodoric the Great finds that he has been only partly successful in persuading the Byzantine emperor Justin I to withdraw his edict against Arian Christianity, and throws the pope into prison.
- May 18 – John I dies of starvation after a 3-year reign. Theodoric the Great selects Pope Felix IV as the 54th pope.
- Ecclesius, bishop of Ravenna, commissions two new churches, one for Ravenna and one for its port, Classis.
- c. 526–547 – Sanctuary apse's mosaic showing Christ enthroned and flanked by Saint Vitalis and Ecclesius, Basilica of San Vitale (Ravenna) is made.

=== 527 ===
==== By place ====
====== Byzantine Empire ======
- April 1 – Emperor Justin I names his nephew Justinian I as co-ruler, as an incurable wound saps his strength.
- August 1 – Justin I, age 77, dies at Constantinople and is succeeded by Justinian I, who becomes sole emperor.
- Justinian I reorganises the command structure of the Byzantine army, and fields a small but highly trained army.
- Justinian I appoints Belisarius to command the Eastern army in Armenia and on the Byzantine-Persian frontier.

====== Britannia ======
- King Cerdic of Wessex and his son Cynric defeat the Britons at Cerdicesleah (modern Chearsley).
- The Kingdom of Essex is founded by the Saxons, who land north of the Thames. They take control of the land between what is now London and St Albans, ceding from the Kingdom of Kent
- Æscwine becomes the first king of Essex (approximate date), defeating Octa in battle at Hackney, west of the River Lea.

====== Japan ======
- Iwai Rebellion: A revolt against the Yamato court breaks out in Tsukushi Province (according to Nihon Shoki).

==== By topic ====
====== Religion ======
- Justinian I outlaws pagan religious practices in Egypt, and dispatches Byzantine missionaries to southern territories (approximate date).
- The Church of the Nativity in Bethlehem is rebuilt until 565, restoring the architectural tone of the basilica.
- Silla, one of the Three Kingdoms of Korea, formally adopts Buddhism as a state religion (approximate date).

=== 528 ===
==== By place ====
====== Byzantine Empire ======
- February 13 – Emperor Justinian I appoints a commission (including the jurist Tribonian) to codify all laws of the Roman Empire that are still in force from Hadrian to the current date; this becomes the Corpus Juris Civilis.
- November 29 – Natural disaster: A second earthquake strikes Antioch, killing thousands.
- Justin, Byzantine general (magister militum), dies in battle against the Bulgars on the frontier of the Danubian limes in Moesia. He is succeeded by Constantiolus.

====== Asia ======
- March 31 – Emperor Xiaoming of Northern Wei, emperor of Northern Wei, is poisoned by order of his mother, the regent Empress Dowager Hu.
- April 1 – The 6-week-old only daughter of Emperor Xiaoming of Northern Wei is proclaimed empress regnant of Northern Wei, by Empress Dowager Hu.
- April 2 – Xiaoming's daughter is replaced by the 2- or 3-year-old Yuan Zhao as emperor of Northern Wei, by order of Empress Dowager Hu
- May 17 – Empress Dowager Hu, regent of Northern Wei, having resorted to an old monarchist tool and executed lovers who have displeased her, is drowned in the Yellow River along with the nominal emperor, the baby Yuan Zhao, and prince Yuan Yong by order of General Erzhu Rong, who places 21-year-old Yuan Ziyou on the throne as Emperor Xiaozhuang of Northern Wei.
- The Hephthalites (White Huns) move from the Hindu Kush into the Punjab region, and eastward across the Ganges Delta, ravaging cities and Buddhist monasteries.
- Yasodharman, Maharaja ("great king") of Malwa, defeats the Hun invaders under Mihirakula in central India.

==== By topic ====
====== Religion ======
- King Seong of Baekje adopts Buddhism as the state religion.
- Bulguksa, a Buddhist temple, is built in South Korea.

=== 529 ===
==== By place ====
====== Byzantine Empire ======
- April 7 – Emperor Justinian I issues the Codex Justinianus (Code of Civil Laws), reformulating Roman law in an effort to control his unruly people (see 532).
- The Samaritans revolt and are defeated; the Church of the Nativity is burnt down during the Rebellion.

====== Europe ======
- Queen Amalasuntha receives a delegation sent by a council of Gothic nobles urging that she have her son Athalaric, now 13, taught an education in the Roman tradition—not by elderly schoolmasters, but by men who will teach him to "ride, fence, and to be toughened, not to be turned into a bookworm".

====== Arabia ======
- Al-Harith ibn Jabalah becomes the fifth king of the Ghassanids. He helps the Byzantines to suppress the wide-scale Samaritan Revolt.

====== Central America ======
- February 25 – Kʼan Joy Chitam I becomes the new ruler of the Mayan city-state of Palenque what is now the state of Chiapas in southern Mexico, ending an interregnum of a little over four years, and reigns until his death in 565.

====== Southeast Asia ======
- Rudravarman is granted investiture by China, as the first king of the fourth dynasty of Champa (modern Vietnam).

==== By topic ====
====== Education ======
- The Academy, originally founded at Athens by Plato around 387 BC, closes down by order of Justinian I, on charges of un-Christian activity. Many of the school's professors emigrate to Persia and Syria.

====== Religion ======
- The Benedictine Order is established at Monte Cassino near Naples by Benedict of Nursia, who founds a monastery and formulates for his monks strict rules in the "Regula Benedicti".
- The Canons of the Council of Orange are established, approving the Augustinian doctrine of sin and grace over Pelagianism and Semi-Pelagianism, but without Augustine's absolute predestination.

== Significant people ==
- Ahkal Mo' Nahb I, Ajaw (Lord) of Palenque (Mayan Empire)
- Boethius, philosopher
- Childebert I, Frankish king, 524-558
- Clodoald, saint
- Chlodomer, King of Orleans, 511-524
- Chlothar I, Frankish King
- Dionysius Exiguus, inventor of the Anno Domini
- Godomar, King of Burgundy
- Guntheuc, Queen of Orleans
- Justin I, Eastern Roman Emperor, 518-527
- Kaleb of Axum, King of Ethiopia
- Sigismund of Burgundy, King of the Burgundians, 516-524
- Theoderic the Great, King of the Ostrogoths, 475-526

== Births ==
520

- Hou Andu, general of the Chen dynasty (d. 563)
- Justin II, emperor of the Byzantine Empire (d. 578)
- Malo, Welsh bishop (approximate date)
- Martin of Braga, missionary and archbishop (d. 580)
- Pope Pelagius II of Rome (d. 589)
- Radegund, Frankish princess (approx.)
- Zuhayr bin Abi Sulma, Arabian poet (approx.)

521

- December 7 – Columba, Gaelic Irish missionary monk (d. 597)
- Agericus, bishop of Verdun (approximate date)
- Gao Cheng, high official and regent of Eastern Wei (d. 549)

522

- 15 October – Colmán of Cloyne, Irish monk (d. 600)
- Clodoald, Merovingian prince (approximate date)
- Wen Di, emperor of the Chen dynasty (d. 566)

523

- Aurelianus, archbishop of Arles (d. 551)

524

- September 18 – Kan Bahlam I, ruler of Palenque (d. 583)
- He Shikai, high official of Northern Qi (d. 571)
- Xiao Daqi, crown prince of Northern Qi (d. 551)
- Xiao Jing Di, emperor of Eastern Wei (d. 552)

525

- Alexander of Tralles, physician (approximate date)
- Pope Benedict I, Pope of Catholic church (d. 579)
- John Climacus, monk and writer (approximate date)
- Justin, Byzantine aristocrat and general (d. 566)
- Liuvigild, king of the Visigoths (d. 586)
- Wideok, king of Baekje (Three Kingdoms of Korea)
- Yujiulü, empress of Western Wei (d. 540)

526

- Wang Lin, general of the Liang Dynasty and Northern Wei (d. 573)
- Yuan Zhao ("the young lord"), emperor of Northern Wei (d. 528)

528

- February 12 – Daughter of Emperor Xiaoming of Northern Wei, nominal empress regnant of Northern Wei

529

- Wen Xuan Di, emperor of Northern Qi (d. 559)

== Deaths ==
520

- January 19 – John of Cappadocia, patriarch of Constantinople
- July – Vitalian, Byzantine general, consul
- Abbán, Irish cult leader and saint (approx.)
- Ardgal mac Conaill, king of Uisneach (Ireland)
- Isidore of Alexandria, Neoplatonist philosopher (approximate date)
- Maximinus, Frankish abbot and saint (approximate date)
- Zu Gengzhi, Chinese mathematician (approx.)

521

- July 17 – Magnus Felix Ennodius, bishop and Latin poet
- November 29 – Jacob of Serugh, Syrian poet and theologian

522

- Eutharic, son-in-law of Theodoric the Great
- Galan Erilich, king of the Picts (approximate date)
- Liu Xie, Chinese writer (approximate date) (b. 465)

523

- August 6 – Pope Hormisdas (b. 450)
- Arethas, leader of the Christian community in Yemen
- Muryeong, king of Baekje (Three Kingdoms of Korea)
- Philoxenus of Mabbug, Syrian theologian
- Thrasamund, king of the Vandals (b. 450)

524

- June 25 – Chlodomer, king of the Franks
- July 12 – Viventiolus, Archbishop of Lyon (b. 460)
- November 29 – Ahkal Moʼ Nahb I, ruler of Palenque (Mexico) (b. 465)
- Boethius, Roman philosopher and writer (b. 480)
- Brigit of Kildare, Irish patron saint
- Sanghapala, Mon-Khmer monk (b. 460)
- Sigismund, king of the Burgundians
- Zhou She, high official of Southern Liang (b. 469)

525

- Boethius, Roman philosopher and writer (or 524)
- Yuan Cha, high official of Northern Wei (approximate date)
- Yūsuf Dhū Nuwas, king of the Himyarite Kingdom (Yemen).

526

- May 18 – Pope John I
- August 30 – Theodoric the Great, king of the Ostrogoths (b. 454)
- October 30 – Paul of Edessa, Syriac Orthodox bishop of Edessa
- Quintus Aurelius Memmius Symmachus, Roman politician

527

- August 1 – Justin I, Byzantine Emperor (b. 450)
- Illan mac Dúnlainge, king of Leinster (Ireland)

528

- March 31 – Emperor Xiaoming of Northern Wei, emperor of Northern Wei (b. 510)
- May 17
  - Empress Dowager Hu of Northern Wei
  - Yuan Yong, imperial prince of Northern Wei
  - Yuan Zhao, emperor of Northern Wei (b. 526)
- Anicia Juliana, daughter of Olybrius (approximate date)
- Bodhidharma, Buddhist monk (approximate date)
- Euphrasius, patriarch of Antioch (in the earthquake)
- Jabalah IV ibn al-Harith, king of the Ghassanids
- Justin, Byzantine general (magister militum)
- Procopius of Gaza, Christian sophist and rhetorician

529

- Baderic, king of the Thuringii (b. c. 480)
- Theodosius the Cenobiarch, monk and founder of the Monastery of St. Theodosius
- Yuan Hao, imperial prince of Northern Wei
