= Ingund =

Queen consort of the Franks
- Born: c. 499; Thuringia
- Died: 546
- Spouse: Chlothar I
- Issue: Gonthaire; Charibert I Guntram; Sigebert I Childeric; Clodoswinthe, Queen of the Lombards
- House: Merovingian dynasty
- Father: King Baderic of Thuringia

Ingonde, Ingund, Ingunda, or (in Latin) Ingundis (c. 499 in Thuringia – 546) was a queen of the Franks by marriage to Chlothar I, son of Clovis.

She was the daughter of King Baderic of Thuringia (c. 480 – c. 529). She became concubine to Chlothar in c.517, before his marriage in c. 524 to Guntheuc, widow of Chlothar's brother Chlodomer. (Note: "...and Clothar immediately married his brother's wife, Guntheuca by name.") This brought Chlothar access to Chlodomer's treasury. On Guntheuc's death in 532, Chlothar married Ingund. During their long relationship they had six children, four of whom would become kings or queen: (Note: "The king had ... by Ingunda, Gunthar, Childeric, Charibert, Gunthram, Sigibert, and a daughter Chlotsinda;")

- Gonthaire or Gonthier, in Latin Gunthacharius, born around 517, died after 532. He took part around 532 in a military campaign led in Septimania;
- Charibert I (or Caribert; circa 521-567), king of Paris from 561 to 567;
- Guntram (or Gontran; around 533-592), King of Burgundy from 561 to 592, King of Paris from 584 to 592;
- Sigebert I (circa 535-575), king of Austrasia from 561 to 575.
- Childeric (possibly Childebert or Childericus ), died before 561;
- Chlothsind, died before 567. She became Queen of the Lombards by marrying King Alboin, son of Aldoin .

Shortly after their marriage (c. 533–538) Ingund requested of Chlothar that he find a husband worthy of her sister, Aregund. (Note: "I beg that you consent to find a husband for my sister") Finding no one suitable, Chlothar took Aregund as one of his own wives in a polygamous marriage. (Note: "To this request he gave heed and being of a wanton nature he fell in love with Aregunda and went to the estate on which she was living and married her himself.") Ingund did not object to this arrangement; (Note: "Let my Lord do what seems good in his eyes") Aregund remained his wife until Ingund's death in 546, after which she fell out of favor with Chlothar.
