= 528 =

Calendar year

528 in various calendars
Gregorian calendar	528; DXXVIII
Ab urbe condita	1281
Assyrian calendar	5278
Balinese saka calendar	449–450
Bengali calendar	−66 – −65
Berber calendar	1478
Buddhist calendar	1072
Burmese calendar	−110
Byzantine calendar	6036–6037
Chinese calendar	丁未年 (Fire Goat); 3225 or 3018 — to — 戊申年 (Earth Monkey); 3226 or 3019
Coptic calendar	244–245
Discordian calendar	1694
Ethiopian calendar	520–521
Hebrew calendar	4288–4289
- Hindu calendars
Vikram Samvat	584–585
Shaka Samvat	449–450
Kali Yuga	3628–3629
Holocene calendar	10528
Iranian calendar	94 BP – 93 BP
Islamic calendar	97 BH – 96 BH
Javanese calendar	415–416
Julian calendar	528; DXXVIII
Korean calendar	2861
Minguo calendar	1384 before ROC 民前1384年
Nanakshahi calendar	−940
Seleucid era	839/840 AG
Thai solar calendar	1070–1071
Tibetan calendar	མེ་མོ་ལུག་ལོ་ (female Fire-Sheep); 654 or 273 or −499 — to — ས་ཕོ་སྤྲེ་ལོ་ (male Earth-Monkey); 655 or 274 or −498

Year 528 (DXXVIII) was a leap year starting on Saturday of the Julian calendar. At the time, it was known as the Year of the Consulship of Sabbatius without colleague (or, less frequently, year 1281 Ab urbe condita). The denomination 528 for this year has been used since the early medieval period, when the Anno Domini calendar era became the prevalent method in Europe for naming years.

== Events ==
=== By place ===
==== Byzantine Empire ====
- February 13 – Emperor Justinian I appoints a commission (including the jurist Tribonian) to codify all laws of the Roman Empire that are still in force from Hadrian to the current date; this becomes the Corpus Juris Civilis.
- November 29 – Natural disaster: A second earthquake strikes Antioch, killing thousands.
- Justin, Byzantine general (magister militum), dies in battle against the Bulgars on the frontier of the Danubian limes in Moesia. He is succeeded by Constantiolus.

==== Asia ====
- March 31 – Emperor Xiaoming of Northern Wei, emperor of Northern Wei, is poisoned by order of his mother, the regent Empress Dowager Hu.
- April 1 – The 6-week-old only daughter of Emperor Xiaoming of Northern Wei is proclaimed empress regnant of Northern Wei, by Empress Dowager Hu.
- April 2 – Xiaoming's daughter is replaced by the 2- or 3-year-old Yuan Zhao as emperor of Northern Wei, by order of Empress Dowager Hu
- May 17 – Empress Dowager Hu, regent of Northern Wei, having resorted to an old monarchist tool and executed lovers who have displeased her, is drowned in the Yellow River along with the nominal emperor, the baby Yuan Zhao, and prince Yuan Yong by order of General Erzhu Rong, who places 21-year-old Yuan Ziyou on the throne as Emperor Xiaozhuang of Northern Wei.
- The Hephthalites (White Huns) move from the Hindu Kush into the Punjab region, and eastward across the Ganges Delta, ravaging cities and Buddhist monasteries.
- Yasodharman, Maharaja ("great king") of Malwa, defeats the Hun invaders under Mihirakula in central India.

=== By topic ===
==== Religion ====
- King Seong of Baekje adopts Buddhism as the state religion.
- Bulguksa, a Buddhist temple, is built in South Korea.

== Births ==
- February 12 – Daughter of Emperor Xiaoming of Northern Wei, nominal empress regnant of Northern Wei

== Deaths ==
- March 31 – Emperor Xiaoming of Northern Wei, emperor of Northern Wei (b. 510)
- May 17
  - Empress Dowager Hu of Northern Wei
  - Yuan Yong, imperial prince of Northern Wei
  - Yuan Zhao, emperor of Northern Wei (b. 526)
- Anicia Juliana, daughter of Olybrius (approximate date)
- Bodhidharma, Buddhist monk (approximate date)
- Euphrasius, patriarch of Antioch (in the earthquake)
- Jabalah IV ibn al-Harith, king of the Ghassanids
- Justin, Byzantine general (magister militum)
- Procopius of Gaza, Christian sophist and rhetorician
