= Ascum =

- Ασκούμ or Ακούμ
- Born: Unknown
- Died: Unknown
- Relatives: Godson of Justinian I
- Military career
- Allegiance: Byzantine Empire
- Branch: Byzantine Army
- Rank: Stratelates of Illyricum (Magister militum per Illyricum)
- Unit: Praetorian prefecture of Illyricum
- Conflicts: Defeat of Huns/Bulgars invasion of Thrace (528)

Ascum (Greek: Ασκούμ) was a general of the Byzantine Empire, active early in the reign of Justinian I (r. 527–565). He was in command of the Praetorian prefecture of Illyricum. His name is reported by John Malalas. Both Theophanes the Confessor and George Kedrenos render his name "Ακούμ" (Acum).

== Biography ==
John Malalas writes that Ascum was a Hun and a godson of Justinian I. Some modern historians consider it possible that the "Huns" of the primary sources were actually Bulgars. Denis Sinor and Michael Withby described Ascum as a Hun, as did Hyun Jin Kim, who specifies he was a Caucasian Hunnic sub-king. Patrick Amory considers the name Ascum to be Germanic in origin, though with the Huns ethnicity and etymology rarely go hand in hand (the name of Attila himself is considered to be of Germanic origin).

Ascum first appears in 528, already holding the title of stratelates of Illyricum (Greek: ὁ τοῦ 'Ιλλυρικοῦ στρατηλάτης). His title in Latin would be magister militum per Illyricum.

In 528, Ascum joined forces with Constantiolus and Godilas against an invasion force of Huns/Bulgars. Having passed through Scythia (Scythia Minor) and Moesia (Moesia Secunda), the invaders were at the time raiding Thrace. The Byzantine army defeated one group of invaders.

Shortly after their victory, the Byzantine forces were ambushed and routed by a second group of invaders. Both Ascum and Constantiolus were captured in this battle. While Constantiolus was ransomed back to the Byzantines, Ascum "was carried off into captivity". He is not mentioned again and his eventual fate is unknown.

== Sources ==
- Amory, Patrick (2003). People and Identity in Ostrogothic Italy, 489-554. Cambridge University Press. ISBN 978-0-521-52635-7.
- Martindale, John R., ed. (1992). The Prosopography of the Later Roman Empire: Volume III, AD 527–641. Cambridge: Cambridge University Press. ISBN 0-521-20160-8.
