= Battle of Autun (532) =

Merovingian battle

Date	532
Location	Autun, Burgundy
Result	Decisive Merovingian victory Fall of the Burgundian kingdom

Belligerents
Merovingians	Burgundians

Commanders and leaders
Childebert I Clothar I	Godomar

The Battle of Autun is said to have been fought in AD 532, when the Merovingian Kings Childebert I and Clothar I decisively defeated the Burgundians, led by King Godomar.
