= Baduarius (Scythia) =

Byzantine general

Baduarius (Greek: Βαδουάριος) was a Byzantine general, active early in the reign of Justinian I (r. 527–565) in Scythia Minor (modern Dobruja).

The historian Patrick Amory considers the name Baduarius to be Germanic in origin. Baduarius is mentioned in the writings of John Malalas, John of Nikiû, Theophanes the Confessor and Georgios Kedrenos. He is recorded in Greek as "stratelates of Scythia", hence probably a magister militum. In 528, Baduarius and Godilas led a military expedition from Odessus (modern Varna) against the Huns of Crimea. Under their leader Mougel, the Huns had reportedly captured Byzantine areas on the coasts of the Black Sea.

Also in 528, Baduarius is mentioned as Dux Scythiae. He and Justin, Dux of Moesia Secunda, joined their forces in battle against a force of foreign invaders. Malalas reports "the Huns", whom Theophanes identifies as Bulgars, invading Scythia and Moesia. Either way, the battle went poorly for the Byzantines. Justin was killed and the invaders next entered Thrace. Justin was replaced by Constantiolus.

While operations against the invaders continued, Baduarius is not mentioned taking part in them. With later battles taking place at some distance from Scythia Minor, he might have nothing to do with them. His eventual fate is unknown. A younger Baduarius turns up in the reign of Justin II (r. 565–578). The Prosopography of the Later Roman Empire considers it likely the younger man could be a son or grandson of the stratelates of Scythia.

== See also ==
- Battarius

== Sources ==
- Amory, Patrick (2003). People and Identity in Ostrogothic Italy, 489-554. Cambridge University Press. ISBN 978-0-521-52635-7.
- Martindale, John R., ed. (1992). The Prosopography of the Later Roman Empire: Volume III, AD 527–641. Cambridge: Cambridge University Press. ISBN 0-521-20160-8.
