= Guntheuc =

Queen consort of the Franks (c. 495–c. 532)

Queen consort of the Franks
- Tenure: 27 November 511 – 23 December 558
- Born: c. 495
- Died: c. 532
- Spouse: Chlodomer (517–524); Chlothar I (524–532)
- Issue: Theodebald; Gunthar; Clodoald
- Religion: Catholic Christianity

Guntheuc (also spelled Gondioc) (c. 495 – c. 532) was a Frankish queen consort. She was first married to King Chlodomer and later to his younger brother, King Chlothar I.

== Life ==
Guntheuc may have been a Princess of Burgundian origin and the granddaughter of Godegisel a King of Burgundy.

In 517, she married Chlodomer, King of the Franks residing at Orléans. Together they had three sons: Gunthar, Theudebald, and Clodoald.

King Chlodomer led an expedition against the Burgundians in 524. He was killed on this expedition, in the spring or summer of the same year, at the Battle of Vézeronce. Soon after Chlodomer's death, his younger brother Clothar I, king at Soissons, married Guntheuc.

Chlodomer's and Guntheuc's three sons were entrusted to their grandmother, Queen Clotilde. However, Clothar and his remaining brothers, Childebert I, procured the sons, ostensibly to raise them to their father's throne but actually to either kill them or cut their hair, removing the symbol of their royal status. Gunthar and Theudebald were killed, while the third son, Clodoald, managed to escape, shaved his head and became a monk. He later became abbot of Nogent and is known as Saint-Cloud.
