= Basilides (patricius) =

Basilides (Greek: Βασιλίδης) was a Byzantine official who held the office of magister officiorum during the reign of Emperor Justinian I (r. 527–565). He was a member of the commission responsible for forming the Corpus Juris Civilis.

On February 13, 528, Basilides was appointed as a member of the commission preparing the Corpus Juris Civilis, serving under Tribonian. Their work was completed in 529. While this is the first chronological mention of him, the text of his appointment mentions him as being already a vir excellentissimus ("most excellent man"), a former praetorian prefect of the East and a patrician. His title of praetorian prefect has been suggested to be honorific, as modern historians find it strange that Basilides could have served in this high-ranking position prior to holding lower offices.

On April 7, 529, official texts mention Basilides as the serving praetorian prefect of Illyricum, a rank lower than his previous title of praetorian prefect of the East. A passage of the Greek Anthology mentions a "Basilius" (Greek: Βασίλειος, Basil) who had served as praetorian prefect of Illyricum and whose statue reportedly stood over the east gate of Thessalonica. Cyril Mango has suggested that this "Basilius" was actually Basilides.

In January 532, the Chronicon Paschale identifies Basilides as the deputy magister officiorum, replacing Hermogenes who had taken up military duties in the Iberian War against the Sassanid Empire. Basilides was eventually replaced by Strategius.

During the Nika riots (January 532), Basilides, Constantiolus, and Mundus served as envoys of Emperor Justinian I to the rioting crowds. They partly attempted to calm the rioters and partly attempted to understand the causes of their wrath. Their report to the Byzantine emperor placed the blame for the uprising on the unpopular financial ministers John the Cappadocian, Tribonian, and Eudaemon, leading to their dismissal from office. Basilides replaced Tribonian as quaestor sacri palatii, the senior legal authority in the Byzantine Empire. He was apparently considered more "acceptable to the people". Soon after, however, he joined Mundus in his attack on the Hippodrome of Constantinople that crushed the revolt.

Basilides likely held his position as quaestor for a couple years at most, for Tribonian was reinstated in late 534 or early 535. A later narrative on the building of the Hagia Sophia claims that Basilides helped raise money and material for the building project. However, the narrative involves several miracles and is considered unreliable. Basildes's actual role in the project, if any, remains uncertain.

Basilides is next recorded holding the title of magister officiorum. His term lasted from March 18, 536 to November 22, 539. He was also an honorary consul in this period. John of Ephesus reports that Pope Agapetus I, visiting Constantinople, sent a magister and the Excubitors against Zooras, an adherent of Monophysitism. Since the events are dated to March 536, the unnamed magister was probably Basilides. In 539, Emperor Justinian replaced Basilides with Peter the Patrician.

Nothing is known of Basilides following the 530s. The late 10th-century Patria of Constantinople reports that the location of his palace in Constantinople was still known by Basilides's name, centuries following his death.

== Sources ==
- Kazhdan, Alexander, ed. (1991). The Oxford Dictionary of Byzantium. Oxford and New York: Oxford University Press. ISBN 0-19-504652-8.
- Martindale, John R., ed. (1992). The Prosopography of the Later Roman Empire: Volume III, AD 527–641. Cambridge: Cambridge University Press. ISBN 0-521-20160-8.
