= Vézeronce-Curtin =

- Commune
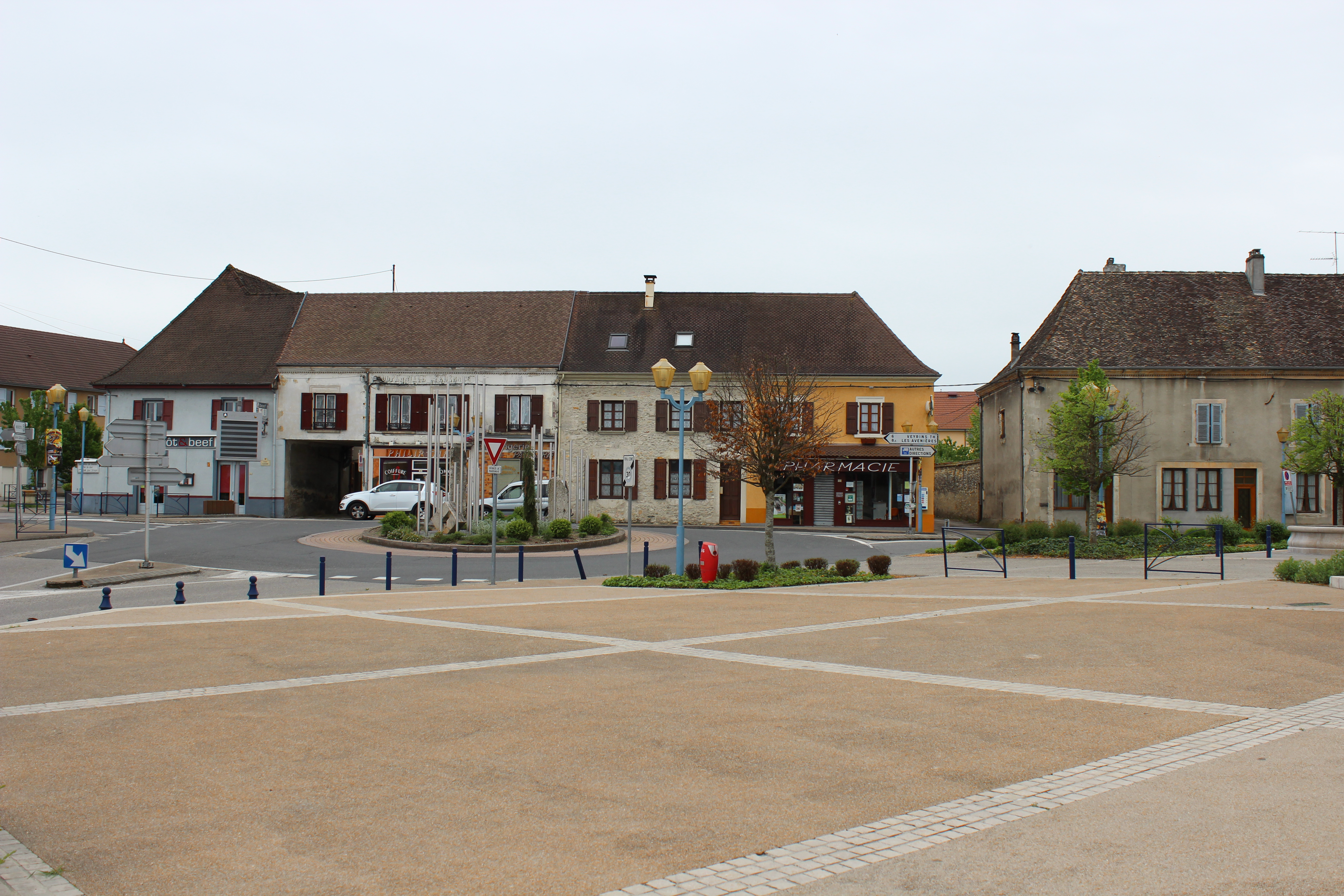
- The Place Clodomir and roundabout

- Coat of arms
- Location of Vézeronce-Curtin
- Location within France Location within Auvergne-Rhône-Alpes
- Coordinates: 45°39′04″N 5°28′12″E
- Country: France
- Region: Auvergne-Rhône-Alpes
- Department: Isère
- Arrondissement: La Tour-du-Pin
- Canton: Morestel
- Intercommunality: Les Balcons du Dauphiné

Government
  - Mayor (2020–2026): Maurice Belantan
- Area^{1}: 14.6 km^{2} (5.6 sq mi)
- Elevation: 220 m (720 ft)
- Highest elevation: 316 m (1,037 ft)
- Lowest elevation: 205 m (673 ft)
- Population (2023): 2,241
  - Density: 153/km^{2} (398/sq mi)
- Time zone: UTC+01:00 (CET)
  - Summer (DST): UTC+02:00 (CEST)
- INSEE/Postal code: 38543 /38510
- ^{1} French Land Register data, which excludes lakes, ponds, glaciers > 1 km^{2} (0.386 sq mi or 247 acres) and river estuaries.

Vézeronce-Curtin (French pronunciation: [vezʁɔ̃s kyʁtɛ̃]) is a commune in the Isère department in southeastern France. It was created in 1973 by the merger of two former communes: Vézeronce and Curtin.

== Population ==
The population data given in the table and graph below for 1968 and earlier refer to the former commune of Vézeronce.

Historical population

Year	Pop.	±% p.a.
1793	800	—
1821	1,007	+0.83%
1846	1,304	+1.04%
1872	1,309	+0.01%
1901	1,137	−0.48%
1926	920	−0.84%
1946	744	−1.06%
1962	710	−0.29%
1968	689	−0.50%

Year	Pop.	±% p.a.
1975	837	+2.82%
1982	1,208	+5.38%
1990	1,320	+1.11%
1999	1,509	+1.50%
2007	1,651	+1.13%
2012	1,917	+3.03%
2017	2,129	+2.12%
2023	2,241	+0.86%

Source: EHESS and INSEE (1975-2023)

== See also ==
- Communes of the Isère department
- Battle of Vézeronce (524)
