= Chlothar I =

King of the Franks (r. 511–558) of the Merovingian dynasty

Chlothar I *Hlodhari
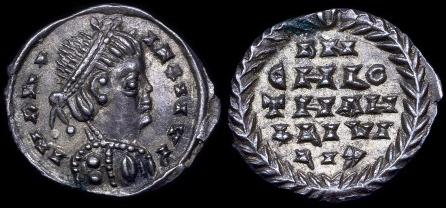
- Silver coin of Chlothar I, marked: d·n· chlothaharivi rex

King of Soissons
- Reign: 511–558
- Predecessor: Clovis I
- Successor: Chilperic I

King of Orléans
- Reign: 524–558
- Predecessor: Chlodomer
- Successor: St. Guntram

King of Reims
- Reign: 555–558
- Predecessor: Theudebald
- Successor: Sigebert I

King of Paris
- Reign: 558
- Predecessor: Childebert I
- Successor: Charibert I

King of the Franks
- Reign: 558–561
- Predecessor: Vacant (last held by Clovis I)
- Successor: Vacant (next held by Clotaire II)
- Born: c. 500 (?)
- Died: December 561 (aged c. 60/61); Compiègne
- Spouse: Guntheuc; Radegund; Ingund; Aregund; Chunsina
- Issue: Gunthar; Childeric; Charibert; St. Guntram; Sigebert; Chilperic; Chlothsind; Chram; Gundoald (disputed)
- Dynasty: Merovingian
- Father: Clovis I
- Mother: Clotilde
- Religion: Chalcedonian Christianity

Chlothar I, (Note: Also spelt Chlothachar, Chlotar, Clothar, Clotaire, Chlotochar, and Hlothar, giving rise to the name Lothair.) sometime called "the Old" (French: le Vieux), (died c. December 561) (Note: His death date is sometimes given as 29 November 561, but this is not accurate. Chlothar was still alive on 28 November and died before the end of the year.) also anglicised as Clotaire from the original French version, was a king of the Franks of the Merovingian dynasty and one of the four sons of Clovis I.

With his eldest brother Theuderic (c. 485 – 533/34) being the son of Clovis I and his first wife, Chlothar followed his two elder brothers Chlodomer (495–524) and Childebert I (496–558) as third surviving son of Clovis I and his second wife Queen Clotilde, lastly followed by their sister Clotilde (500–531). The name 'Chlothar' means "glory".

In 511, Chlothar I and his three brothers, Theuderic, Chlodomer and Childebert, inherited their shares of their father's kingdom. Chlothar spent most of his life in a campaign to expand his territories at the expense of his relatives and neighbouring realms in all directions.

His brothers avoided outright war by cooperating with Chlothar's attacks on neighbouring lands in concert or by invading lands when their rulers died. The spoils were shared between the participating brothers. By the end of his life, Chlothar had managed to reunite Francia by surviving his brothers and seizing their territories after they died. But upon his own death, the Kingdom of the Franks was once again divided between his own four surviving sons. A fifth son had rebelled and was killed, along with his family.

== Customs and inheritance ==
Chlothar's father, Clovis I, had converted to Nicene Christianity, but Chlothar, like other Merovingians, did not consider that the Christian doctrine of monogamy should be expected of royalty: he had five wives, more from political expediency, for the purpose of forming alliances, than for personal motives. Although at the instigation of his queens, he gave money for several new ecclesiastical edifices, he was a less than enthusiastic Christian and succeeded in introducing taxes on ecclesiastical property.

Frankish customs of the day allowed for the practice of polygamy, especially among royalty. So it was not uncommon for a king to have multiple wives and several competing heirs upon his death. This was a major deviation from the monogamy of late Roman customs, influenced by the Church. Frankish rulers followed this practice mainly to increase their influence across larger areas of land in the wake of the Roman Empire's collapse. The aim was to maintain peace and ensure the preservation of the kingdom by appeasing local leaders. In the Germanic tradition, succession fell, not to sons, but to younger brothers, uncles, and cousins. But under Salic law, Clovis I instituted the custom of sons being the primary heirs in all respects. However, it was not a system of primogeniture, with the eldest son receiving the vast majority of an inheritance, the inheritance was split evenly between all the sons. Therefore, the greater Frankish Kingdom was often splintered into smaller sub-kingdoms.

== Marriages and children ==
According to Gregory of Tours, "The King Chlothar had seven sons of various women, namely: with Ingund he had Gunthar, Childeric, Charibert, Guntram, Sigebert, and a daughter named Chlothsind; of Aregund, sister of Ingund he had Chilperic; and of Chunsine he had Chram." Chlothar's first marriage was to Guntheuc, widow of his brother Chlodomer, sometime around 524. They had no children. His second marriage, which occurred around 532, was to Radegund, daughter of Bertachar, King of Thuringia, whom he and his brother Theuderic defeated. She was later canonized. They also had no children. His third and most successful marriage was to Ingund, by whom he had five sons and two daughters:

- Gunthar, predeceased father
- Childeric, predeceased father
- Charibert, King of Paris
- Guntram, King of Burgundy
- Sigebert, King of Austrasia
- Chlothsind, married Alboin, King of the Lombards
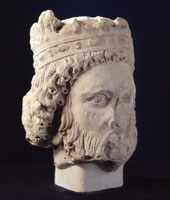
  Imagined bust of Chlothar, 13th century.

Chlothar likely had an illegitimate son named Gondovald with an unnamed woman, born sometime in the late 540s or early 550s. Since Chlothar had sown children all throughout Gaul, this was not unlikely. The boy was given a literary education and allowed to grow his hair long, a symbol of belonging to royalty. Although Chlothar would offer no more aid or privilege to the boy, his mother took him to the court of Childebert, who recognized him as his nephew and agreed to keep him in court.

His next marriage was to a sister of Ingund, Aregund, with whom Chlothar had a son, Chilperic, King of Soissons. His last wife was Chunsina (or Chunsine), with whom he had one son, Chram, who became his father's enemy and predeceased him. Chlothar may have married and repudiated Waldrada.

A false genealogy found in the Brabant trophies, made in the ninth century during the reign of Charles the Bald, invents a daughter of Chlothar's named Blithilde who supposedly married the saint and bishop Ansbert of Rouen. The Duke Arnoald, father of Arnulf of Metz, was said to have been born of this marriage, thus connecting the Merovingian and Carolingian dynasties and creating the appearance that the Carolingian ruled by right of inheritance. It also linked them to the Romans by their affiliation with the senatorial family Ferreoli.

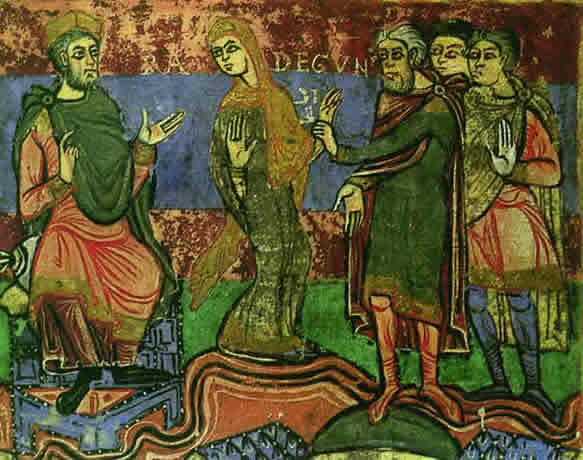
Radegund is brought before Chlothar

=== Marriage with Guntheuc ===
Chlothar married Guntheuc, Queen of Orléans and widow of Chlodomer, his brother. This union gave Chlothar access to Chlodomer's treasury and ensured Guntheuc's position as sole heiress to King Godegisel lands; Frankish law allowed a woman to inherit land if she had no sons.

=== Marriage with Aregund ===
Chlothar's wife Ingund requested that he find a husband worthy of her sister, Aregund. Finding no one suitable, Chlothar took Aregund as one of his own wives. The year was c. 533–538. She remained his wife until the death of her sister, Ingund, in 546, after which she fell out of favor with Chlothar.

=== Princess Radegund ===
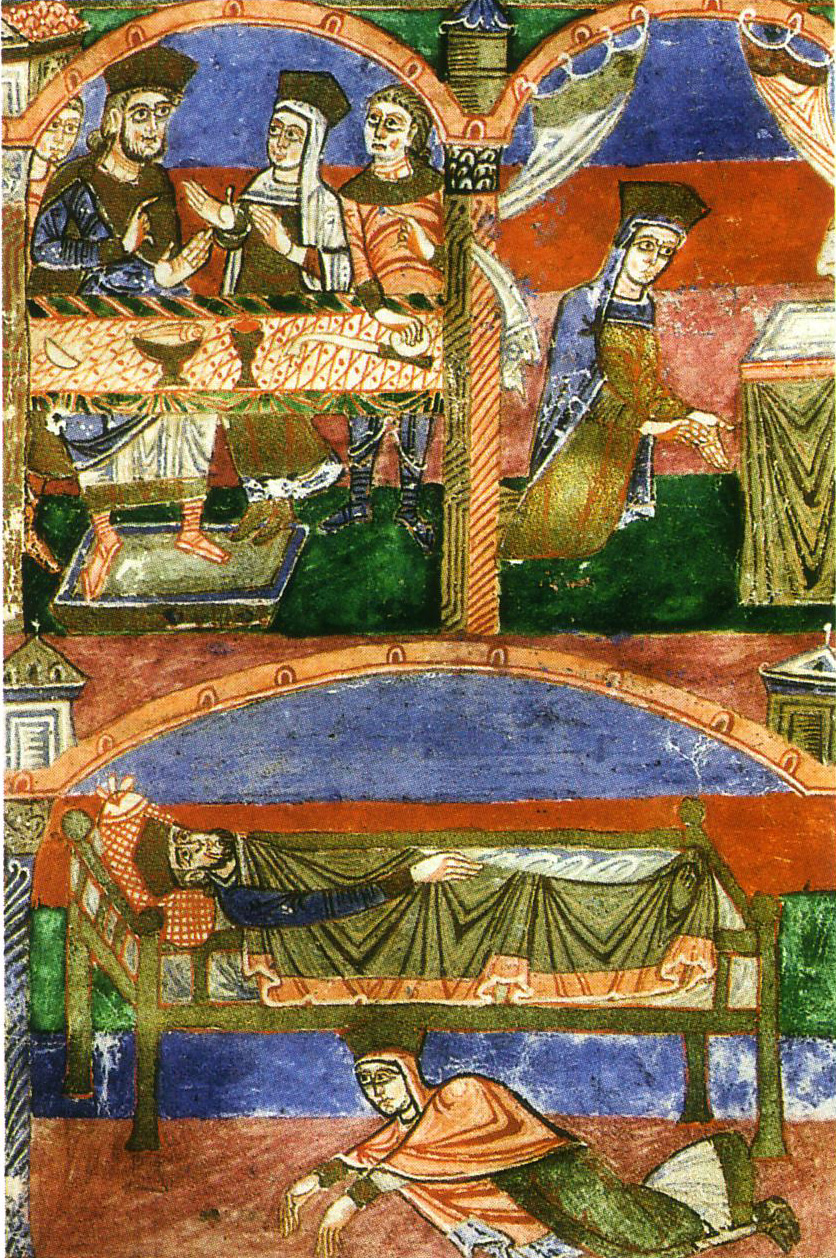
Radegonde's wedding, depiction of her praying, and prostrate in the marital bed

In 538, Radegund was brought to Soissons to marry Chlothar, as a "not illegitimate but legitimate queen," who could help consolidate his dominance over Thuringia.

While her title and status were necessary for Chlothar to attain authority over Thuringia, Radegund remained in simple clothing and was not treated in the customary manner of a queen. This was largely due to her Christian faith; she did not want to appear luxurious.

Radegund did not eat to excess. She insisted that much of her food be given to the poor. She spent most of her time praying and singing psalms, but spent very little time with the king. Her allegiance was to God first and to Chlothar second. Chlothar became irritated and had many disputes with her.

She retired to a convent and went on to found the abbey in Poitiers, St. Croix, the first nunnery in Europe. She was canonized Saint Radegund.

The expansion of Clothar's territories, shown in brown

== Accession and campaigns ==
=== Accession ===
Upon his father's death on 27 November 511, he received as his share of the kingdom: the town of Soissons, which he made his capital; the cities of Laon, Noyon, Cambrai, and Maastricht; and the lower course of the river Meuse. He was very ambitious and sought to extend his domain.

Because of the rights of mothers, queens were granted a portion of their sons' kingdom. Clovis I, who had two wives, divided his kingdom into two for each of his wives, then parcelled out pieces to his respective sons. The eldest, Theuderic, son of the first wife, had the benefit of receiving one-half of the kingdom of Francia, Reims. Chlothar shared the second half of the kingdom with his brothers Childebert and Chlodomer. Chlothar received the northern portion, Childebert the central kingdom of Paris, and Chlodomer the southern Kingdom of Orléans. The domain inherited by Chlothar consisted of two distinct parts: one in Gaulic Belgium, corresponding to the kingdom of the Salian Franks, where he established his capital at Soissons and included the dioceses of Amiens, Arras, Saint-Quentin and Tournai; and the other in Aquitane including the dioceses of Agen, Bazas, and Périgueux.

=== First Burgundian War ===
In 516, Gundobad, king of Burgundy, died, and the throne passed to his son Sigismund, who converted to Catholicism. Sigismund adopted an extreme anti-Arian policy, going so far as to execute his Arian son Sigeric, who was the grandson of the Ostrogoth King Theoderic the Great. Sigismund also nearly prompted the Franks to launch an offensive against him, but he avoided a conflict by giving one of his daughters, Suavegotha, in marriage to Chlothar's older half-brother, Theuderic I.

In 523, at the instigation of their mother, Clotilde, Chlothar, Childebert, and Chlodomer joined forces in an expedition against the Burgundians. The Burgundian army was defeated, and Sigismund was captured and executed. Sigismund's brother Godomar replaced him on the throne, with the support of the aristocracy, and the Franks were forced to leave.

In 524, Chlothar, his brothers and Theuderic began a new campaign, advancing to the Isère Valley. But on 25 June 524, they suffered a serious defeat at the Battle of Vézeronce, and Chlodomer was killed. The Franks left Burgundy, and Godomar resumed his rule until 534.

=== Thuringian conquest ===
In 531, Hermanafrid, king of the Thuringians, promised to give Chlothar's half-brother, Theuderic, part of the Kingdom of Thuringia if he would help to depose Baderic, Hermanafrid's rival and brother. Theuderic accepted. However, having been injured after a victory, he appealed to Chlothar to continue the war. Hermanafrid died around this time, and the goal became simply to conquer Thuringia.

The alliance, along with the aid of his nephew Theudebert I, conquered Thuringia, and it became a part of the Frankish domain. During the division of the spoils, Chlothar and Theuderic argued fiercely over the hand of Princess Radegund, but eventually Chlothar won the dispute on the grounds that it had been his men who had captured her.

=== Acquisition of the kingdom of Orléans ===
Chlothar was the chief instigator in the murder of his brother Chlodomer's children in 524, and his share of the spoils consisted of the cities of Tours and Poitiers. Chlothar's brother, Chlodomer was killed on 25 June 524 during an expedition against the Burgundians at the Battle of Vezeronce. Upon Chlodomer's death, his three sons, Theodebald, Gunther, and Clodoald, were entrusted to the care of their grandmother, hence the young princes were raised in Paris by Chlodomer's mother, Chlotilde.

To prevent the kingdom of Orleans from returning to his nephews, Chlothar joined with his brother Childebert in 532 to threaten the young heirs with death unless they agreed to join a monastery. They sent Arcadius, grandson of Sidonius Apollinaris, to their mother, Clotilde, with a pair of scissors and a sword. He gave the queen an ultimatum: the boys could either live as monks or die.

Germanic traditions gave Queen Clotilde, as the mother, the right as head of her household. However, among kings, the lineage passed to younger brothers before it passed to the next generation. Due to tribal politics, shearing of the boys' hair could lead to a civil war; long hair was a symbol of Frankish royalty, and to remove it was considered a grave insult. But Theodebald, Gunthar, and Clodoald could someday lay claim to the throne, and it was Chlothar and Childebert's duty to pass authority on to them.

Clotilde was disgusted and shocked at the demands relayed by Arcadius and stated that she would rather see her grandsons dead than see their hair shorn.

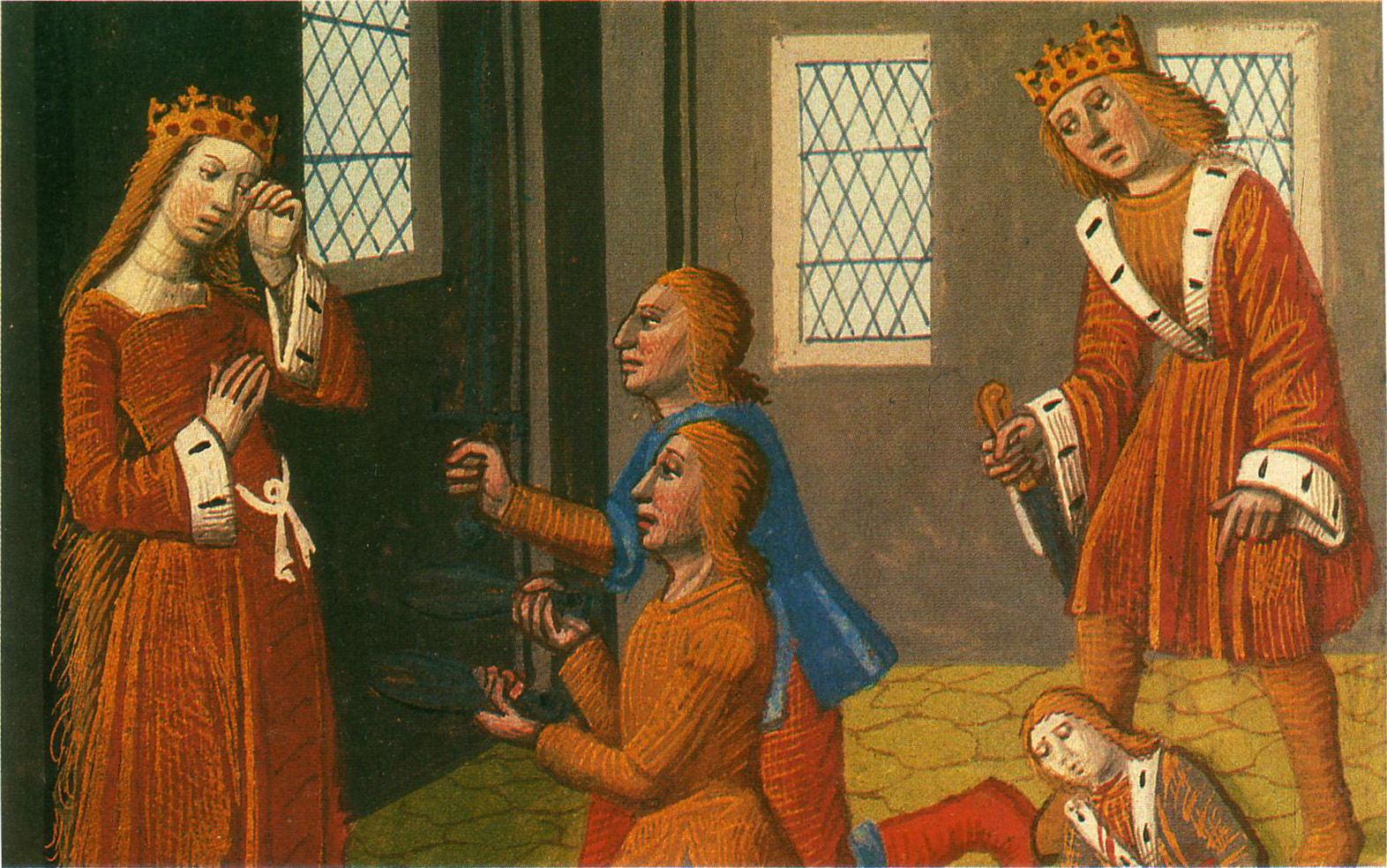
Assassination of Thibaut and Gunthar

The two uncles went through with their plan to murder the children. Chlothar stabbed Theodebald in the armpit. Gunthar threw himself at the feet of Childebert, who began to cry and almost gave in to the pleas of his nephew. Chlothar, however, demanded that Childebert carry through with the murder, stating that it was the only way to consolidate power. Childebert gave Gunthar up to Chlothar, who stabbed him. Theodebald and Gunthar were ten and seven years old, respectively.

Clodoald remained alive by managing to escape, hidden by loyal supporters. He renounced all claims and chose a monastic life. Childebert and Chlothar could then freely share their acquired territory. Meanwhile, Theuderic captured a parcel consisting of Auxerrois, Berry and Sens.

=== Second Burgundian war ===
In 532, Childebert and Chlothar seized Autun. They hunted for Godomar III, brother of Sigismund, with the help of his father and ally, the king of the Ostrogoths Theoderic the Great.

The death of Athalaric, the grandson and successor of Theodoric the Great, in 534, generated a succession crisis in the Ostrogothic kingdom, the Burgundian ally. Chlothar, Theudebert, and Childebert took the opportunity to invade the Burgundian kingdom, now devoid of Ostrogothic protection. The Burgundian kingdom was overtaken and divided among the three Frankish rulers. Chlothar received Grenoble, Die and many of the neighbouring cities.

=== First Visigoth war ===
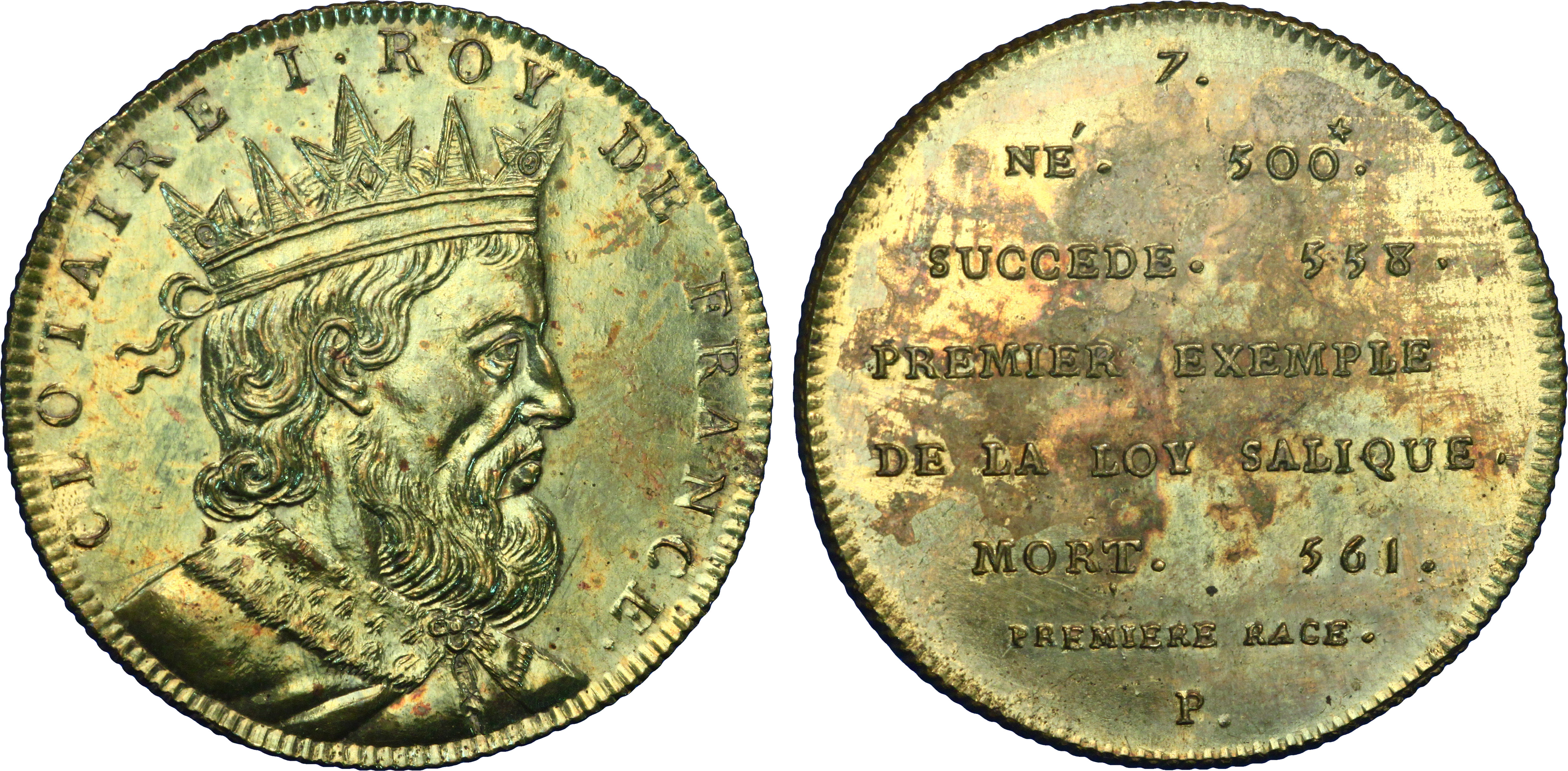
Imagined bust of Chlothar on coin minted by Louis XVIII

Over the years, the Spanish Visigoths had made many incursions into Frankish territories and had taken lands. Clovis had reconquered them and even made further conquests of Gothic territories. Chlothar sent his eldest sons to reclaim lost territories. Although there was some success, for some unknown reason, Gunthar, his second eldest, ended his campaign and returned home. Theudebert, the eldest, continued the war and took the strongholds of Dio-et-Valquières and Cabrières. Most of the lost Frankish lands were recovered.

=== Civil war ===
Chlothar attempted to take advantage of Theuderic's illness during this time, trying to attain his kingdom with the help of Childebert. However, Theudebert, who was busy securing Arles, rushed back to his father Theuderic's aid. Theuderic died a few days later. And Theudebert, supported by his vassals, managed to keep his kingdom and restrained his uncles from taking over.

Childebert and Theudebert joined forces and declared war on Chlothar. They initially defeated him, forcing him to take refuge in a forest for protection against the alliance. While Chlothar was besieged, a storm ravaged equipment, roads, and horses and disorganized the allied army. Childebert and Theudebert were forced to abandon the siege and make peace with Chlothar.

=== Ceding of Provence ===
In 537, a conflict broke out between the Eastern Roman Empire and the Ostrogothic kingdom. To ensure Frankish neutrality in the conflict, King Vitiges offered Provence, which the Frankish Kings shared between them, along with the northern Alps with sovereignty over the Alemanni, by grabbing the upper Rhine valley, Main, and high Danube. When the Ostrogoths ceded Provence to the Franks, he received the cities of Orange, Carpentras, and Gap.

=== Second Visigoth war ===
In spring 542, Childebert and Chlothar, accompanied by three of his sons, led an army into Visigoth Hispania. They seized Pamplona and Zaragoza but were finally forced to abandon after conquering most of the country. Since most of the king's army was still with Theudis and there was still enough power to be shown, they were ceded some major lands beyond the Pyrénées, although not as much as they had occupied.

=== Ostrogothic tribute ===
In 535, the Roman Emperor Justinian offered 50000 solidi to the three Frankish kings in exchange for an attack against the Ostrogothic Kingdom in support of his invasion of Italy. In 536 Vitiges, the new king offered Provence and Rhaetia in exchange for military help, which the Franks agreed to. However, Childebert and Theudebert cheated Chlothar, Childebert taking the money and Theudebert the land offered by Vitiges. Chlothar's treasury was still much larger than either Childebert's or Theudebert's.

Frankish Realm in 548

=== Acquisition of Metz ===
Theudebald, Chlothar's great-nephew and the grandson of the late Theuderic, died childless in 555. So Chlothar immediately went to Metz to take possession of the kingdom from his late nephew, but under Salic Law, he had to share it with his brother. So he married Waldrada, Theudebald's widow and the daughter of the Lombard king Wacho. This ensured the smooth succession to the kingdom of Metz, as well as an alliance with the Lombards, established since the reign of Theudebert. But the bishops condemned this incestuous marriage and forced Chlothar to divorce her. They gave her in marriage to the Bavarian Duke Garibald. To compensate for the breakdown of the marriage with Vuldetrade (Waldrada), Chlothar gave Chlothsind, his daughter, to the Lombard prince and future king, Alboin. Condat the Domesticus, great administrator of the palace of King Theudebald, retained his position after the annexation of the kingdom of Metz.

=== Saxon war ===
In 555, Chlothar attacked and conquered the Saxons, who had revolted, in the upper valley of the Weser, Elbe, and the coast of the North Sea. As a submission, Chlothar required them to pay a substantial annual tribute and, for some time, exacted from the Saxons an annual tribute of 500 cows.

Between 555 and 556, the Saxons revolted again, perhaps instigated by Childebert. Faced with the Saxon revolt and threat of a massacre, Chlothar preferred peace talks. He offered to forego battle if they would accept his demand to continue to pay him tribute, despite a previous rejection. But his men, aggressive, eager for battle, contested the decision. Talks were cut short when the soldiers forced him, with insults and death threats, to take on the Saxons. After an incredibly bloody battle, the Saxons and Franks made peace.

Frankish Real from 556 to 560

=== Submission of Auvergne ===
Auvergne, a once prosperous Roman province, which had resisted the Visigoths and Franks, had hoped they could avoid destruction by offering their loyalty. Theuderic had devastated much of the land, and Theudebert pacified the land by marrying a Gallo-Roman woman of Senatorial descent. In anticipation of the death of Theodebald, Chlothar sent his son Chram to take possession of the area. In time, Chram came to control a larger area and desired to break away from his father entirely. To achieve this, he joined forces with Childebert, who encouraged his dissent. In time his influence was expanded over Poitiers, Tours, Limoges, Clermont, Bourges, Le Puy, Javols, Rodez, Cahors, Albi, and Toulouse.

=== War with Chram ===
Chlothar again engaged in war with the Saxons. He sent his sons Charibert and Guntram to lead an army against Chram. They marched to Auvergne and Limoges and finally found Chram in Saint-Georges-Nigremont. Their armies met at the foot of a "black mountain", where they demanded that Chram relinquish land belonging to their father. He refused, but a storm prevented the battle. Chram sent a messenger to his half-brothers, falsely informing them of the death of Chlothar at the hands of the Saxons. Charibert and Guntram immediately marched to Burgundy. The rumour that Chlothar had died in Saxony spread throughout Gaul, even reaching the ears of Childebert. It is possible that Childebert was behind the rumour as well. Chram then took the opportunity to extend his influence to Chalon-sur-Saône. He besieged the city and won. Chram married Chalda, daughter of Wiliachaire (Willacharius), Count of Orléans, which was under Childebert's authority.

=== Unification of all Francia ===
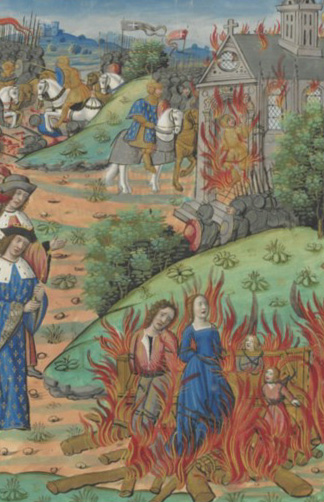
The Death of Chramn, in a 16th-century miniature

On 23 December 558, Childebert died after a long illness, leaving no heirs. This allowed Chlothar to reunite the Greater Frankish Kingdom, as his father Clovis had done, and seize the treasure of his brother.

The news of Childebert's death had caused many kingdoms to unify under Chlothar. Paris, which had fought against him, submitted to his rule. Chram, therefore, called on the Bretons to allow him refuge. He had made such an agreement with his father-in-law, Willacharius, Count of Orléans, although he was currently taking refuge himself in the Basilica of St. Martin of Tours. Chram was caught and subsequently burned "for the sins of the people and the scandals that were perpetrated by Wiliachaire and his wife." Chlothar then restored the Basilica.

Between 1 September and 31 August 559, with the help of the Bretons, Chram plundered and destroyed a large number of places belonging to his father. Chlothar, accompanied by his son Chilperic, advanced to Domnonée and arrived there in November or December of 560. During the battle, located near the coast, Conomor was defeated and killed when he attempted to flee. Conomor owned land on both sides of the Channel, and Chram perhaps intended to flee from Chlothar to take refuge in England with the support of Conomor. Chram fled for the sea, but first attempted to rescue his wife and daughters. He was then captured and immediately sentenced to death. He and his wife and daughters were locked in a shack and were strangled and burned. Overwhelmed with remorse, Clothar went to Tours to implore forgiveness at the tomb of St Martin and died shortly afterwards at the royal palace at Compiègne.

== Relations with the church ==
In 561, Chlothar attempted to raise taxes on churches, despite the exemption granted by Roman law, which had been routinely confirmed by past kings. Indeed, Childeric I had granted immunities to ecclesiastics. The Bishop of Tours, Injuriosus, refused, left his diocese, and abandoned Chlothar. At the death of the bishop, the king replaced him with a member of his household named Baudin. Similarly, Chlothar exiled the bishop of Trier, Nizier, because of its inflexibility on canon law. Thus, the tax on churches was held.

Ingund and Chlothar made many additions to churches, including the decorations of the tomb of Saint-Germain Auxerre; the basilica is preserved with a given royal chalice.

=== Female monasticism ===
Chlothar financed the construction of the monastery of Sainte-Croix in Poitiers, which folds Radegund. He transferred reliquaries that the queen had accumulated during her stay with the king to the monastery of St. Croix.

== Death ==
Breakup of the Frankish Kingdoms upon Chlothar's death in 561

At the end of his reign, the Frankish kingdom was at its peak, covering the whole of Gaul (except Septimania) and part of present-day Germany. Chlothar died at the end of 561 of acute pneumonia at the age of 64, leaving his kingdom to his four sons. They went to bury him at Soissons in the Basilica of St. Marie, where he had started to build the tomb of St. Médard.

== Succession ==
- Charibert received the former kingdom of Childebert I, between the Somme and Pyrénées, with Paris as its capital, and including the Paris Basin, Aquitaine and Provence.
- Guntram received Burgundy with a part of the Kingdom of Orléans, where he established his capital.
- Sigebert received the Kingdom of Metz with its capitals Reims and Metz.
- Chilperic received the territories of the Kingdom of Soissons in the north.

Chlothar I Merovingian dynasty Died: 561
Preceded by Clovis I	King of Soissons; 511–558	Succeeded by Chilperic I
Preceded by Chlodomer	King of Orléans; 524–558	Succeeded by Guntram
Preceded by Theudebald	King of Reims; 555–558	Succeeded by Sigebert I Moved to Metz
Preceded by Childebert I	King of Paris; 558	Succeeded by Charibert I
Vacant Title last held by Clovis I	King of the Franks; 558–561	Vacant Title next held by Chlothar II
