= Godilas =

Byzantine general

Godilas (Greek: Γοδιλᾶς) was a Byzantine general, active in the reigns of Emperor Justin I (r. 518–527) and Emperor Justinian I (r. 527–565).

== Biography ==
According to some scholars Godilas was probably a Goth. The name has also been considered to be of Gothic origin (Gudila).

Godilas is first mentioned in 518 as one of the officers involved in the proclamation of Justin I as Byzantine emperor. The ceremony is recorded in the De Ceremoniis, compiled by Emperor Constantine VII Porphyrogennetos (r. 913–959) in the 10th century, and gives his rank as campiductor/campidoctor ("drill instructor") of the regiment of the Lanciarii (Greek: καμπιδούκτωρ τῶν λαγκιαρίων).

In 528, Godilas, along with Baduarius, led a military expedition from Odessus (modern Varna) against the Huns of the Crimea. Under their leader, Mougel, the Huns had reportedly captured Byzantine areas on the coasts of the Black Sea. Later that year, Godilas joined forces with Ascum and Constantiolus in facing an ongoing invasion of Huns/Bulgars in Thrace. The Byzantine army managed to defeat one group of invaders in battle, but they were then ambushed and routed by a second group of Huns/Bulgars. Both Constantiolus and Ascum were captured by their pursuing enemies through the use of lassoes, and only Godilas was able to break through and escape, as recorded by John Malalas and Theophanes the Confessor.

His military rank at the time of these battles is uncertain. Both Ascum and Constantiolus held the rank of magister militum. As Godilas served alongside them, rather than act as their subordinate, it is likely that he held an equivalent rank, either as magister militum per Thracias or as magister militum vacans.

== Sources ==
- Martindale, John R., ed. (1980). The Prosopography of the Later Roman Empire: Volume II, AD 395–527. Cambridge: Cambridge University Press. ISBN 0-521-20159-4.
- Martindale, John R., ed. (1992). The Prosopography of the Later Roman Empire: Volume III, AD 527–641. Cambridge: Cambridge University Press. ISBN 0-521-20160-8.
