= 510 =

Calendar year

510 in various calendars
- Gregorian calendar: 510; DX
- Ab urbe condita: 1263
- Assyrian calendar: 5260
- Balinese saka calendar: 431–432
- Bengali calendar: −84 – −83
- Berber calendar: 1460
- Buddhist calendar: 1054
- Burmese calendar: −128
- Byzantine calendar: 6018–6019
- Chinese calendar: 己丑年 (Earth Ox); 3207 or 3000 — to — 庚寅年 (Metal Tiger); 3208 or 3001
- Coptic calendar: 226–227
- Discordian calendar: 1676
- Ethiopian calendar: 502–503
- Hebrew calendar: 4270–4271
- Hindu calendars
- Vikram Samvat: 566–567
- Shaka Samvat: 431–432
- Kali Yuga: 3610–3611
- Holocene calendar: 10510
- Iranian calendar: 112 BP – 111 BP
- Islamic calendar: 115 BH – 114 BH
- Javanese calendar: 396–397
- Julian calendar: 510; DX
- Korean calendar: 2843
- Minguo calendar: 1402 before ROC 民前1402年
- Nanakshahi calendar: −958
- Seleucid era: 821/822 AG
- Thai solar calendar: 1052–1053
- Tibetan calendar: ས་མོ་གླང་ལོ་ (female Earth-Ox); 636 or 255 or −517 — to — ལྕགས་ཕོ་སྟག་ལོ་ (male Iron-Tiger); 637 or 256 or −516

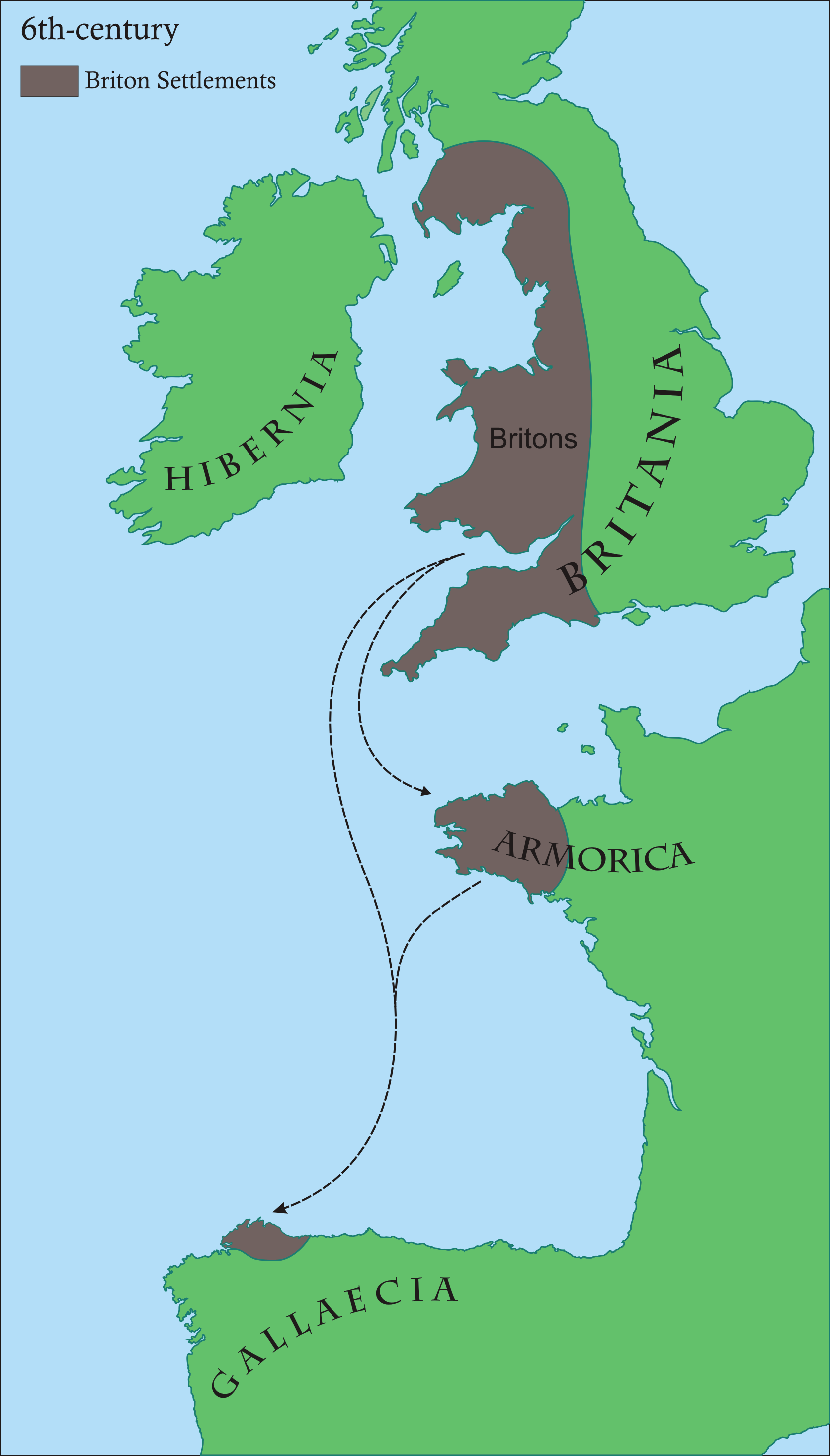
Map of British settlements (6th century)

Year 510 (DX) was a common year starting on Friday of the Julian calendar. In the Roman Empire, it was known as the Year of the Consulship of Severinus without colleague (or, less frequently, year 1263 Ab urbe condita). The denomination 510 for this year has been used since the early medieval period, when the Anno Domini calendar era became the prevalent method in Europe for naming years.

== Events ==
=== By place ===
==== Britannia ====
- Battle of Llongborth (possibly Langport or Portsmouth): King Budic II of Brittany seeks refuge at the court of Aergol Lawhir, in Dyfed (Wales) after the battle.

==== Europe ====
- King Theodoric the Great raises the Frankish siege at Arles; the city is heroically defended by its inhabitants, assisted by the Ostrogothic general Theudis. The Ostrogoths overrun Provence (Southern Gaul), and consolidate their gains in the region.
- Theodoric the Great appoints his friend Anicius Manlius Severinus Boethius, Roman philosopher, to the rank of consul of the Ostrogothic Kingdom.

==== Persian Empire ====
- The Sasanian Persians conquer the independent kingdom of Caucasian Albania, a state converted to Christianity in the 4th century by Armenian missionaries (approximate date).

== Births ==
- Aredius, abbot and saint (approximate date)
- Gildas, Celtic monk (approximate date)
- Xiao Ming Di, emperor of Northern Wei (d. 528)
- Xiao Wu Di, emperor of Northern Wei (d. 535)
- Yifu, empress of Western Wei (d. 540)

== Deaths ==
- January 1 – Eugendus, abbot of Condat Abbey
- Drest II, king of the Picts (approximate date)
- Hashim, great-grandfather of Muhammad (approximate date)
- Tato, king of the Lombards (approximate date)
