= 526 =

Calendar year

526 in various calendars
- Gregorian calendar: 526; DXXVI
- Ab urbe condita: 1279
- Assyrian calendar: 5276
- Balinese saka calendar: 447–448
- Bengali calendar: −68 – −67
- Berber calendar: 1476
- Buddhist calendar: 1070
- Burmese calendar: −112
- Byzantine calendar: 6034–6035
- Chinese calendar: 乙巳年 (Wood Snake); 3223 or 3016 — to — 丙午年 (Fire Horse); 3224 or 3017
- Coptic calendar: 242–243
- Discordian calendar: 1692
- Ethiopian calendar: 518–519
- Hebrew calendar: 4286–4287
- Hindu calendars
- Vikram Samvat: 582–583
- Shaka Samvat: 447–448
- Kali Yuga: 3626–3627
- Holocene calendar: 10526
- Iranian calendar: 96 BP – 95 BP
- Islamic calendar: 99 BH – 98 BH
- Javanese calendar: 413–414
- Julian calendar: 526; DXXVI
- Korean calendar: 2859
- Minguo calendar: 1386 before ROC 民前1386年
- Nanakshahi calendar: −942
- Seleucid era: 837/838 AG
- Thai solar calendar: 1068–1069
- Tibetan calendar: ཤིང་མོ་སྦྲུལ་ལོ་ (female Wood-Snake); 652 or 271 or −501 — to — མེ་ཕོ་རྟ་ལོ་ (male Fire-Horse); 653 or 272 or −500

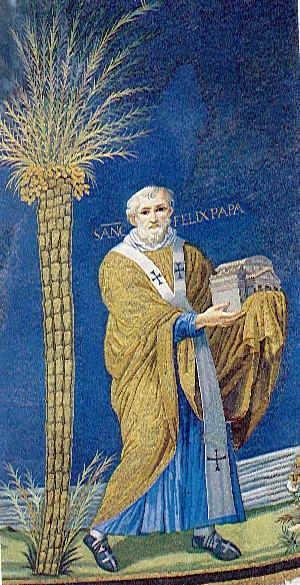
Pope Felix IV (526–530)

Year 526 (DXXVI) was a common year starting on Thursday of the Julian calendar. At the time, it was known as the Year of the Consulship of Olybrius without colleague (or, less frequently, year 1279 Ab urbe condita). The denomination 526 for this year has been used since the early medieval period, when the Anno Domini calendar era became the prevalent method in Europe for naming years.

== Events ==
=== By place ===
==== Europe ====
- August 30 – King Theodoric the Great dies of dysentery at Ravenna; his daughter Amalasuintha takes power as regent for her 10-year-old son Athalaric.
- Amalasuintha rules the Ostrogothic Kingdom that extends throughout the Italian Peninsula, Dalmatia, Sicily, Sardinia and Corsica.
- Amalaric, age 24, becomes king of the Visigoths, and assumes full royal power.

==== Persia ====
- Roman–Persian Wars: King Kavad I, assisted by his Arabian vassal, Al-Mundhir III, begins a campaign in the Transcaucasus region and Upper Mesopotamia.

==== Middle East ====
- Probably between May 20 and May 29 – 526 Antioch earthquake: A great earthquake kills approximately 250,000 people in Syria and Antioch.

=== By topic ===
==== Religion ====
- Pope John I returns to Ravenna from Constantinople. Theodoric the Great finds that he has been only partly successful in persuading the Byzantine emperor Justin I to withdraw his edict against Arian Christianity, and throws the pope into prison.
- May 18 – John I dies of starvation after a 3-year reign. Theodoric the Great selects Pope Felix IV as the 54th pope.
- Ecclesius, bishop of Ravenna, commissions two new churches, one for Ravenna and one for its port, Classis.
- c. 526–547 – Sanctuary apse's mosaic showing Jesus enthroned and flanked by Saint Vitalis and Ecclesius, Basilica of San Vitale (Ravenna) is made.

== Births ==
- Wang Lin, general of the Liang Dynasty and Northern Wei (d. 573)
- Yuan Zhao ("the young lord"), emperor of Northern Wei (d. 528)

== Deaths ==
- May 18 – Pope John I
- August 30 – Theodoric the Great, king of the Ostrogoths (b. 454)
- October 30 – Paul of Edessa, Syriac Orthodox bishop of Edessa
- Quintus Aurelius Memmius Symmachus, Roman politician
