= Godomar II =

6th-century king of Burgundy

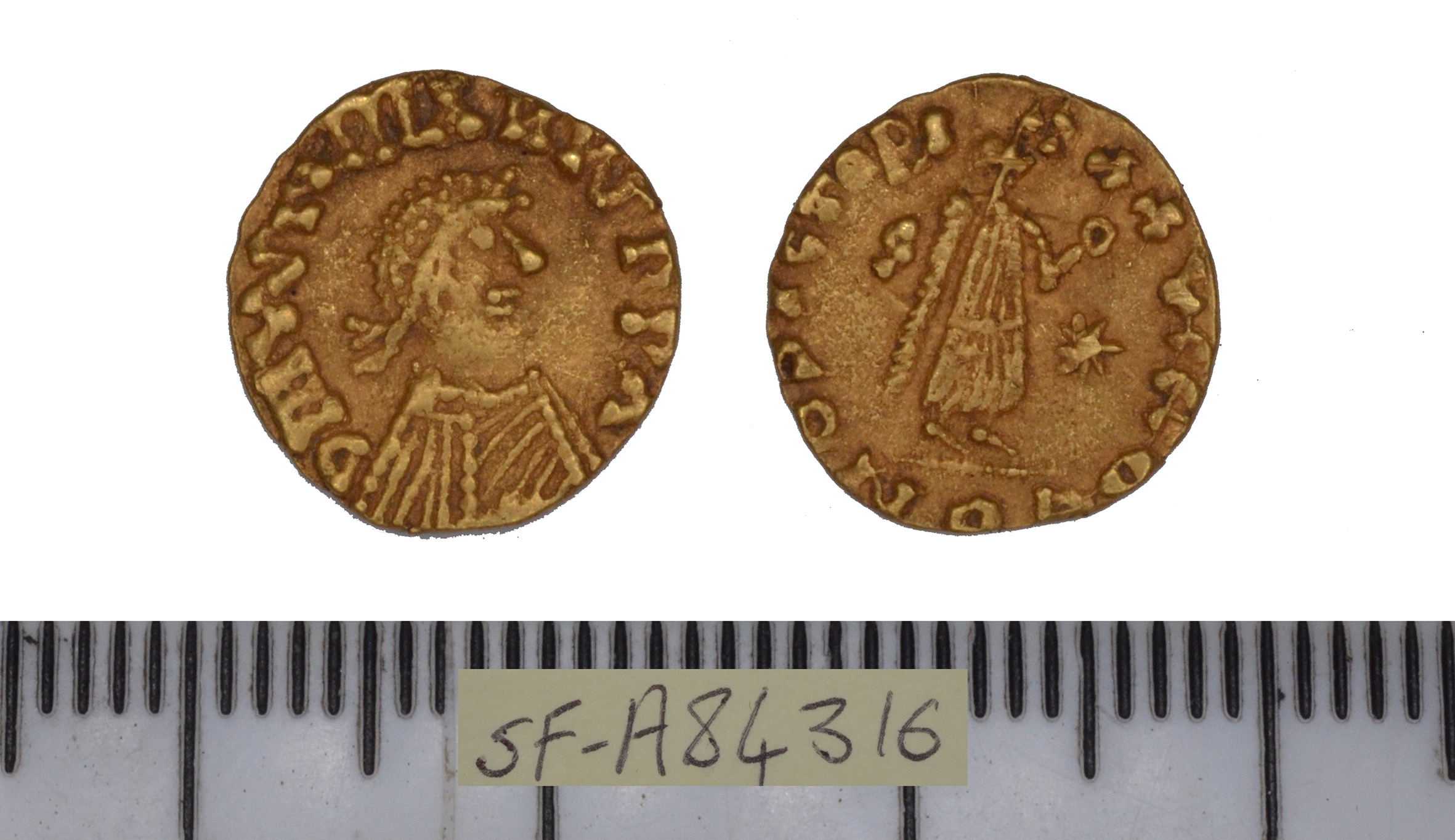
Tremissis in the name of Justinian I, made by Gundomar II

Godomar II (also spelled Gundomar), son of king Gundobad, was king of Burgundy. Following the death of his older brother Sigismund in 524, he ruled Burgundy until 534.

== Life ==
According to Gregory of Tours, Sigismund married the daughter of the Ostrogoth King Theodoric. They had a son, Sigeric. Later, the widowed Sigismund remarried, and his second wife maltreated and insulted her stepson. The Queen persuaded Sigismund that Sigeric planned to kill his father and seize the throne. Sigismund ordered the young man to be taken while drunk and drowned in a well.

The murder of Sigeric in 523 caused tension between the Ostrogoths and the Burgundians. The sons of Clovis took advantage of the political situation to attack the Burgundian kingdom, which now stood alone. Sigismund and Godomar led the Burgundian defense but lost the battle. Sigismund was defeated by the Franks; he, his wife and his two sons were captured through treachery by Clovis's eldest son, Chlodomer, King at Orléans, and were executed.

Godomar is suspected of having sided with the Franks in this battle. Godomar fled and then rallied the Burgundian army. With this army, he regained his territory. Meanwhile, Chlodomer ordered the death of Sigismund and with his brother Theuderic I, King at Metz, marched on Burgundy in 524. On June 25, 524, Godomar led the Burgundians to victory over the Franks in the Battle of Vézeronce, in which Chlodomer himself fell. The Franks then retreated and gave up the fight for Burgundy for the time being.

Three years after Sigismund's death, Godomar had his body recovered and subsequently buried in the Chapel of St. John in the Abbey of Saint-Maurice d'Agaune, the monastery that the Sigismund had founded and to which he had subsequently retreated for some time after the death of his son.

When the Franks made another attempt at conquest in 532, Godomar II was unable to repel them. He was defeated by them in the Battle of Autun, which meant the end of his reign and the end of the kingdom, which the Merovingians definitively incorporated into their empire and finally divided among themselves in 534. His further fate is not known.

| Preceded by Sigismund | King of Burgundy; 524–534 | Succeeded by Childebert I, Clotaire I and Theodebert I |
