= Battarius =

Battarius (AD 150s – After AD 170) was a barbarian child ruler in the Marcomannic War. He is mentioned in the Historia romana of Cassius Dio. Accordingly, Battarius went before Marcus Aurelius, and requested an alliance. The emperor granted his request. In return for gold, Battiarus managed to succeed in restraining Tarbus, a neighbouring chieftain, who had come into Dacia threatening to make war unless Rome paid him gold.

== Sources ==
- Cassius Dio, Historia romana, Books LXXII
