= Praetorian prefecture of Illyricum =

Administrative division of the Late Roman Empire (347-630s)

Praetorian prefecture of Illyricum Praefectura praetorio per Illyricum Ἐπαρχότης Ἰλλυρικοῦ
- Praet. prefecture of the East Roman Empire
- 347–630s
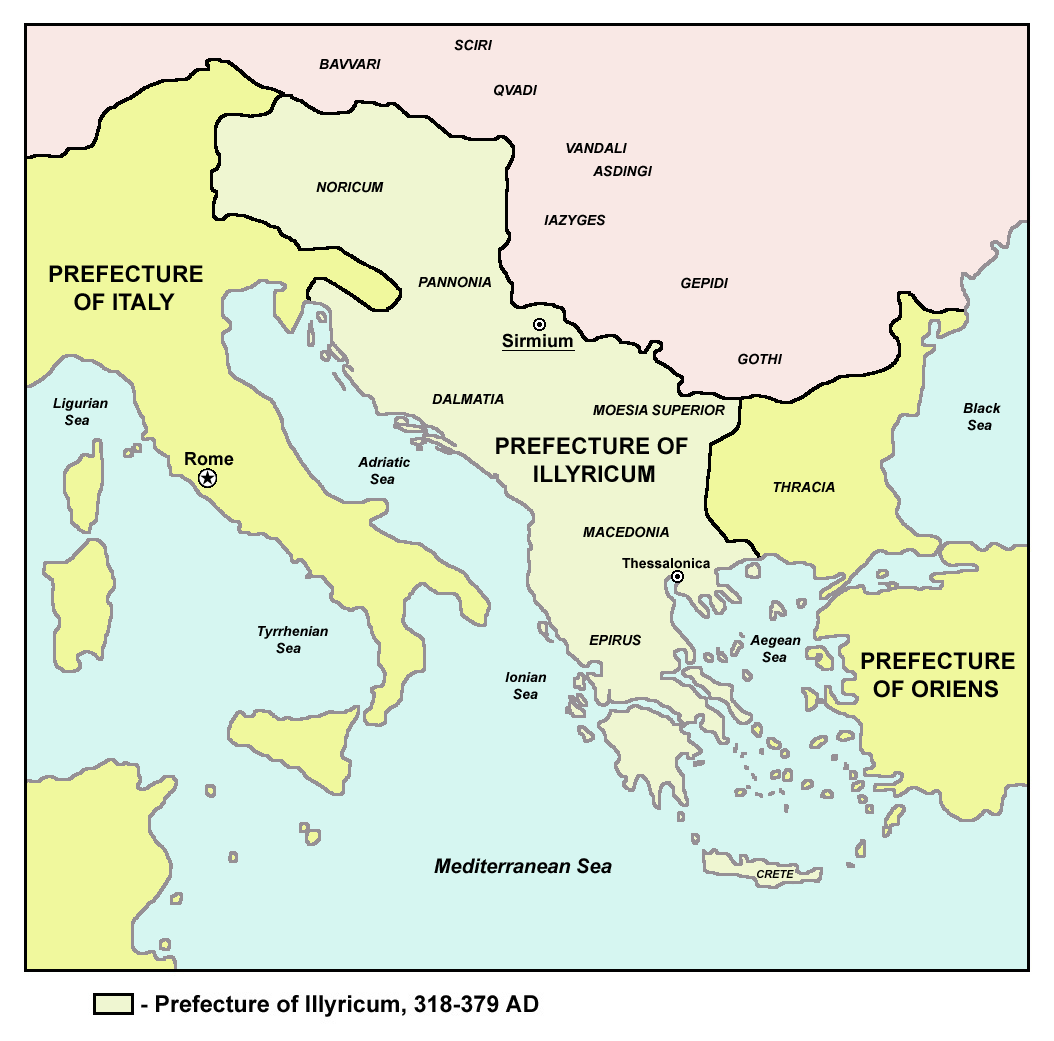
- The praetorian prefecture of Illyricum (375–379)
- Capital: Sirmium, later Thessalonica
- Historical era: Late antiquity
  - Established: 347
  - loss of most of Illyricum to Slavic incursions: 630s
- Political subdivisions: Diocese of Macedonia; Diocese of Dacia; Diocese of Pannonia (until 379)

The praetorian prefecture of Illyricum (Latin: praefectura praetorio per Illyricum; Greek: ἐπαρχότης/ὑπαρχία [τῶν πραιτωρίων] τοῦ Ἰλλυρικοῦ, also termed simply the prefecture of Illyricum) was one of four praetorian prefectures into which the Late Roman Empire was divided.

The administrative centre of the prefecture was Sirmium (375–379), and, after 379, Thessalonica. It took its name from the older province of Illyricum, which in turn was named after ancient Illyria, and in its greatest expanse encompassed Pannonia, Noricum, Crete, and most of the Balkan peninsula except for Thrace.

== Administrative history ==
Unlike the other three "classical" prefectures that are mentioned in the Notitia Dignitatum (Gaul, the Italy-Africa and the East), the early administrative history of Illyricum as a prefecture during the 4th century involved its abolition, re-establishment and division several times.

Initially the territories comprising the later praetorian prefecture of Illyricum belonged to the Prefecture of Italy, Illyricum and Africa. It was as established as a praetorian prefecture in its own right during the dynastic struggles between the sons of Constantine the Great which followed his death in 337. It seems that the three dioceses of Macedonia, Dacia and Pannonia were first grouped together in a separate praetorian prefecture in 347 by Constans by removing them from the praetorian prefecture of Italy, Africa and Illyricum (which then became the praetorian prefecture of Italy and Africa) or that this praetorian prefecture was formed in 343 when Constans appointed a prefect for Italy.

It remained in existence until 361, when it was abolished by emperor Julian, and then revived under Gratian between 375 and 379. In that year the Diocese of Pannonia (Illyricum occidentale, "Western Illyricum") was again added to Italy as the "Diocese of Illyricum", while Macedonia and Dacia (Illyricum orientale, "Eastern Illyricum") were briefly ruled directly by Theodosius I from Thessalonica. During the years 384–395 they were again incorporated in the Italian prefecture, except a short period in 388–391, when the two dioceses formed a separate prefecture.

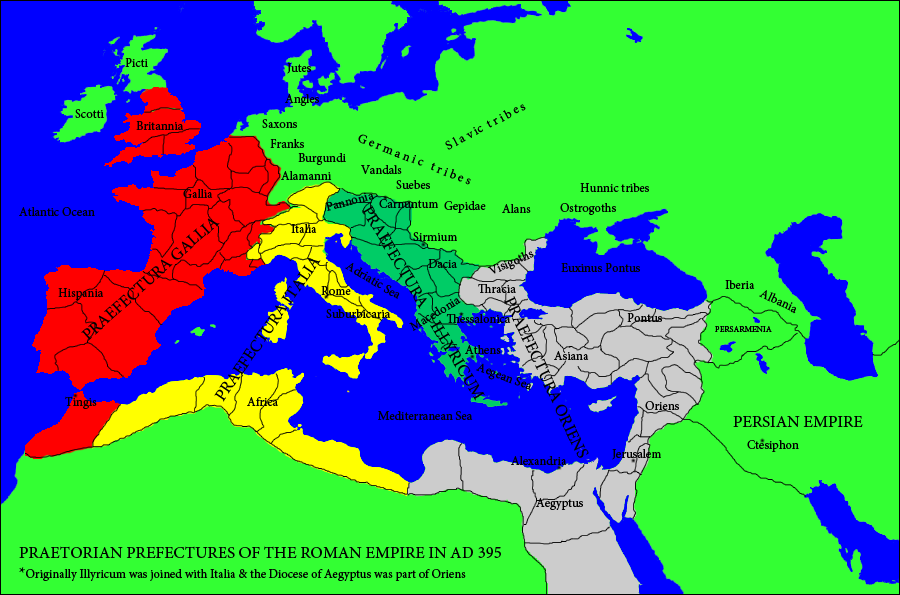
Praetorian Prefectures of the Roman Empire (375–379)

Only after the death of Theodosius in 395 and the division of the Empire did the Illyricum assume the permanent form which appears in the Notitia, incorporating the dioceses of Macedonia and Dacia, with Thessalonica as capital. However, the Western Empire, especially during the regency of Stilicho, continued claim them until 437 when, as part of the dowry of Licinia Eudoxia, Valentinian III recognized the East's sovereignty over the prefecture. On this occasion, it appears that the prefecture's capital was moved to Sirmium (437–441), although the realization of such a move is debated, as the northern Balkans were at the time ravaged by invasions. Likewise, the intention of Justinian I to move the capital to his new city of Justiniana Prima in the 540s remained unfulfilled.

Following the Slavic invasions in the 6th and 7th century, most of the Balkan hinterland was lost by the Byzantines, who only retained control of the parts of Thrace nearest Constantinople, Thessalonica and its environs, and some coastal strips in Greece. A praetorian prefect (ὕπαρχος) is attested in the sources as governor of Thessalonica as late as the first years of the 9th century, one of the last survivals of the old Constantinian administrative system in the entire Empire. At that point however, the wars with the rising power of Bulgaria necessitated a reorganization of the provinces, and Thessalonica was constituted as a distinct theme under a strategos sometime before 840.

== List of known praefecti praetorio per Illyricum ==
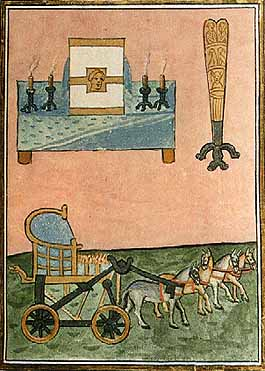
Insignia of the Praetorian Prefect of the Illyricum

- Vulcacius Rufinus (347–352)
- Quintus Flavius Maesius Egnatius Lollianus Mavortius (355–56)
- Anatolius (−360)
- Florentius (360)
- Sextus Claudius Petronius Probus (c.364)
- Quintus Clodius Hermogenianus Olybrius (378–379)
- Vettius Agorius Praetextatus (384, also Praetorian Prefect of Italy)
- Flavius Eutychianus (396–397)
- Anatolius (397–399)
- Herculius (408–410)
- Leontius (412–413)
- Flavius Junius Quartus Palladius (416–421, also Praetorian Prefect of Italy)
- Gessius (some time between 421 and 443)
- Flavius Anthemius Isidorus (424)
- Flavius Simplicius Reginus (435)
- Eubulus (436)
- Thalassius (439)
- Apraeumius (441)
- Eulogius (c. 451)
- Valentinianus (452)
- Callicrates (468–469)
- Iohannes (472)
- Basilides (529)

== Sources ==
- Bulić, Dejan (2013). "The Fortifications of the Late Antiquity and the Early Byzantine Period on the Later Territory of the South-Slavic Principalities, and their re-occupation". The World of the Slavs: Studies of the East, West and South Slavs: Civitas, Oppidas, Villas and Archeological Evidence (7th to 11th Centuries AD). Belgrade: The Institute for History. pp. 137–234.
- Bury, John B. (1912), A history of the Eastern Roman empire from the fall of Irene to the accession of Basil I. (A. D. 802–867), London: Macmillan and Co.
- Curta, Florin (2001). The Making of the Slavs: History and Archaeology of the Lower Danube Region, c. 500–700. Cambridge: Cambridge University Press.
- Curta, Florin (2006). Southeastern Europe in the Middle Ages, 500–1250. Cambridge: Cambridge University Press.
- Given, John (2014). The Fragmentary History of Priscus. Merchantville, New Jersey: Evolution Publishing.
- Janković, Đorđe (2004). "The Slavs in the 6th Century North Illyricum". Гласник Српског археолошког друштва. 20: 39–61.
- Kazhdan, Alexander, ed. (1991), Oxford Dictionary of Byzantium, Oxford University Press, ISBN 978-0-19-504652-6
- Mirković, Miroslava B. (2017). Sirmium: Its History from the First Century AD to 582 AD. Novi Sad: Center for Historical Research.
- Mócsy, András (2014) [1974]. Pannonia and Upper Moesia: A History of the Middle Danube Provinces of the Roman Empire. New York: Routledge.
- Petrović, Vladimir P. (2007). "Pre-Roman and Roman Dardania: Historical and Geographical Considerations" (PDF). Balcanica. 37. Balkanološki institut SANU: 7–23.
- Popović, Radomir V. (1996). Le Christianisme sur le sol de l'Illyricum oriental jusqu'à l'arrivée des Slaves. Thessaloniki: Institute for Balkan Studies.
- Whitby, Michael (1988). The Emperor Maurice and his Historian: Theophylact Simocatta on Persian and Balkan warfare. Oxford: Clarendon Press.
- Zeiller, Jacques (1918). Les origines chrétiennes dans les provinces danubiennes de l'Empire romain. Paris: E. De Boccard.
- Notitia dignitatum
