= Aregund =

Queen consort of Francia
- Tenure: 558 – 561
- Born: c. 515/520
- Died: 580
- Burial: Saint Denis Basilica
- Spouse: Chlothar I
- Issue: Chilperic I
- House: Merovingian dynasty
- Father: Baderic

Aregund, Aregunda, Arnegund, Aregonda, or Arnegonda (c. 515/520–580) was a Frankish queen.

Aregund was the wife of Clotaire I (also known as Clothar) king of the Franks, and the mother of Chilperic I of Neustria. She was the great-grandmother of the last of the Merovingian kings to wield power, Dagobert I.

She is known for the discovery of her tomb at St. Denis, France, though some questions remain as to the accuracy of this identification.

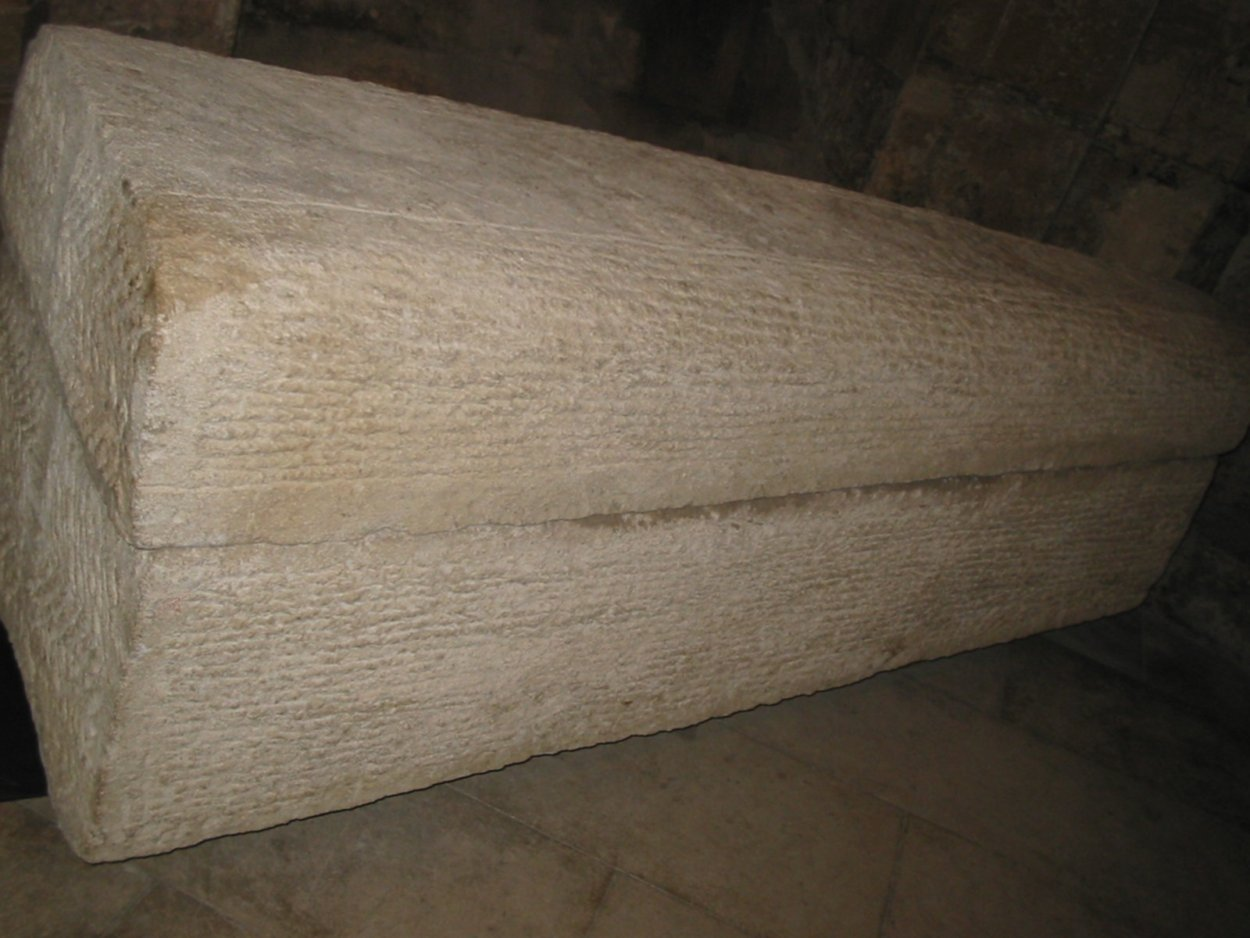
Sarcophagus of Arégonde

== Marriage ==
Aregund and Clotaire are believed to have been married no later than 536 CE.

Gregory of Tours claimed that Clotaire married both Aregund and her sister Ingund. It is said that Ingund was quite alarmed at her sister staying single and asked her husband Clotaire to find Aregund a husband. After meeting his sister-in-law, Clotaire is rumored to have announced to his wife that he had found her a suitable husband: himself. While Ingund bore 5 sons and one daughter, Aregund bore one son.

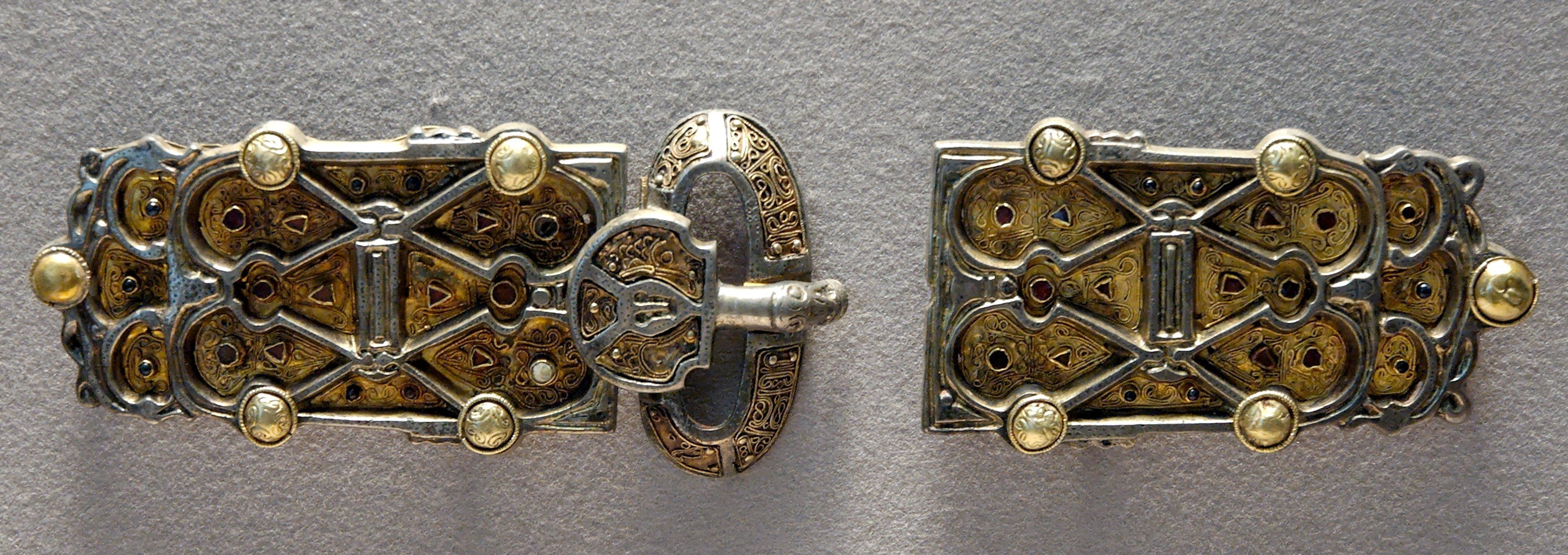
Belt plaques from the finery set of Queen Aregund

The study of a skeleton identified as Aregund suggests she had a child when she was aged about 18. In Frankish society at the time, girls often married around the age of 15. The same person (whose identification has been disputed) likely had a limp as osteoarchaeology has shown that she suffered from poliomyelitis at a young age. If one accepts the original identification, Clotaire may have married his sister-in-law out of pity, as she was not deemed marriageable due to her lameness. Alternatively, as the death rate from childbirth was high, Aregund may have succeeded her sister to foster her orphaned nephews and nieces.

Ingund died between 538 and 546 AD. After this time Aregund fell out of favor with Clotaire.

In 538, Clotaire married Radegund of Thuringia, who was a first cousin of Aregund and Ingund.

== Widowhood ==
Aregund and Radegund both survived their husband Clotaire.

== Archeology ==
What was believed to be Aregund's sarcophagus was discovered, among dozens of others, in 1959 in the Saint Denis Basilica by archaeologist Michel Fleury. It contained remarkably well-preserved clothing items and jewelry. However, subsequent research throws doubt on the identification.
