= Suavegotha =

Burgundian royal

Queen consort of Metz
- Tenure: 516/7 – 534
- Born: c. 495/6 or 504
- Died: after 549 (aged approx. 45 or 53/54)
- Spouse: Theuderic I
- Issue: Theudechild
- Father: Sigismund of Burgundy
- Mother: Ostrogotho

Suavegotha (died after 549), also known as Suavegotta or Suavegotho, was the daughter of the Burgundian king Sigismund and his Ostrogothic wife Ostrogotho. She was apparently married to Theuderic I, but scholars debate whether she was his first or second wife.

== Biography ==
According to the historian Gregory of Tours, Theuderic I, King of the Franks at Metz, married a daughter of the Burgundian king Sigismund. He does however not mention the name of this wife. The wife of Theuderic is often identified with the queen Suavegotha mentioned by the 10th century chronicler Flodoard.

In 523, the sons of Clovis I invaded Burgundy. King Sigismund was captured by Chlodomer, King of the Franks at Orléans, and subsequently killed.

According to Flodoard, Suavegotha had a daughter named Theudechild. According to the German historian Eugen Ewig, Suavegotha was the wife of Theuderich, and the daughter of Sigismund's second wife, whose name is unknown but it's more likely that her mother was actually Sigismund's first wife Ostrogotho. Therefore, she was the granddaughter of Theodoric the Great, King of the Ostrogothic Kingdom of Italy and niece of Gundobad, King of Burgundy. Theuderic died in 534.

== Sources ==
- Martina Hartmann: Die Königin im frühen Mittelalter. Kohlhammer Verlag, Stuttgart 2009, ISBN 978-3-17-018473-2, S. 66.
- Matthias Springer: Theuderich I. In: Reallexikon der Germanischen Altertumskunde (RGA). 2. Auflage. Band 30, Walter de Gruyter, Berlin / New York 2005, ISBN 3-11-018385-4, S. 459–463 (hier: 461).
