= Childebert I =

King of Paris and Orleáns (died 558)

Childebert I *Hildiberht
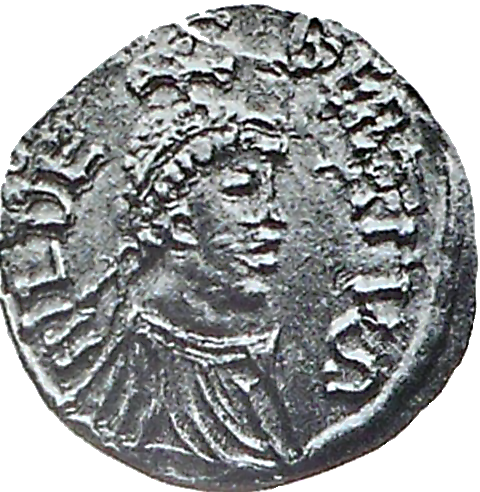
- Coin of Childebert I with his profile

King of Paris
- Reign: 511–558
- Predecessor: Clovis I
- Successor: Chlothar I

King of Orléans
- Reign: 524–558
- Predecessor: Chlodomer
- Successor: Chlothar I
- Born: c. 496; Reims
- Died: 13 December 558 (aged 61–62)
- Spouse: Ultragotha
- Issue: Chrodoberge; Chrodesinde
- Dynasty: Merovingian
- Father: Clovis I
- Mother: Clotilde
- Religion: Chalcedonian Christianity

Childebert I (c. 496 – 13 December 558) was a Frankish King of the Merovingian dynasty; as the third of the four sons of Clovis I, he inherited a share of the kingdom of the Franks, which was divided upon their father's death in 511. He was one of the sons of Saint Clotilda, and was born at Reims. He reigned as King of Paris from 511 to 558 and Orléans from 524 to 558.

== Biography ==
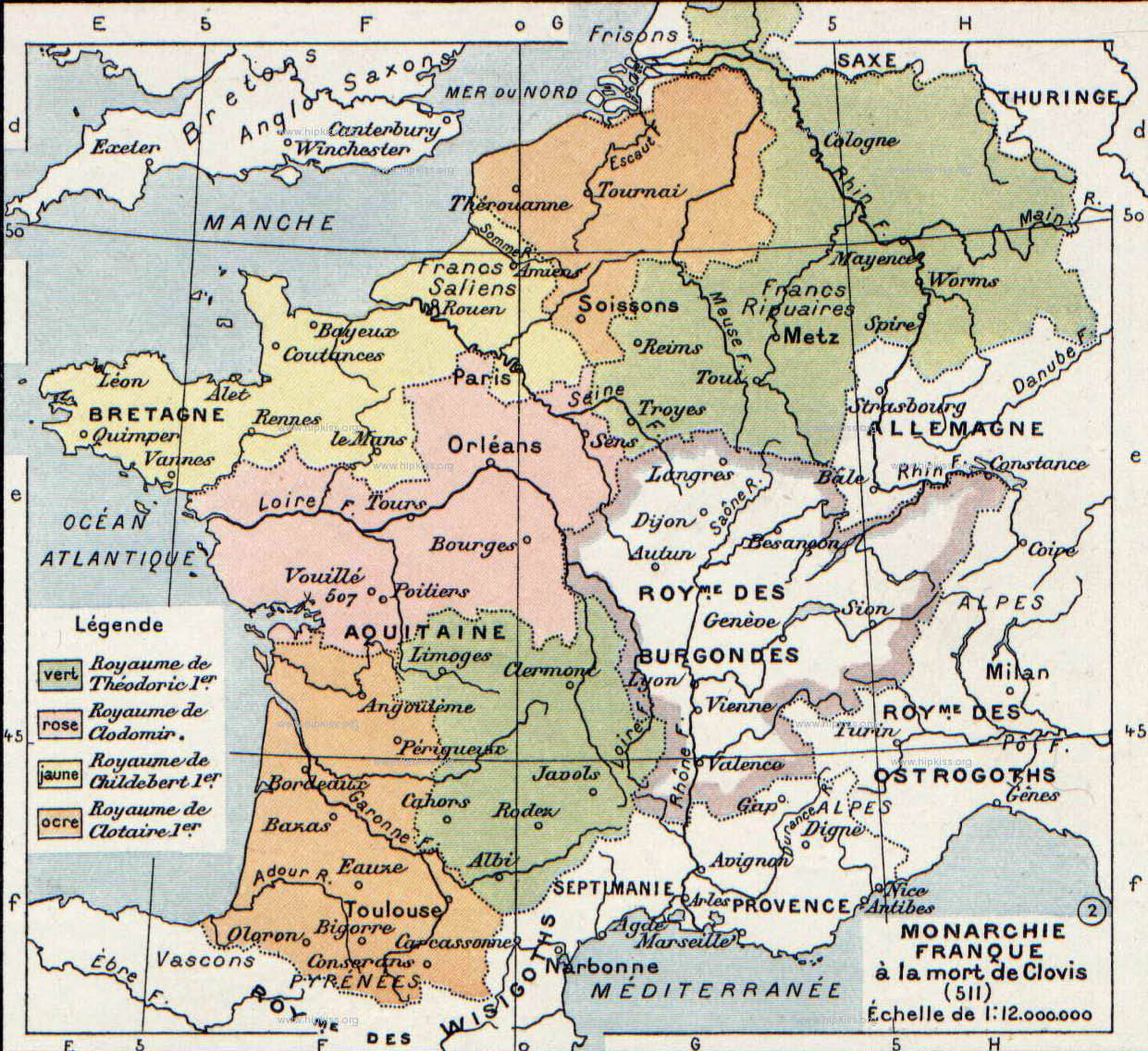
The division of the lands of Gaul to the sons of Clovis I upon his death in 511.

In the partition of the realm upon his father's death, Childebert received as his share the town of Paris, the country to the north as far as the river Somme, to the west as far as the English Channel, and the Armorican peninsula (modern Brittany). His brothers ruled in different lands: Theuderic I in Metz, Chlodomer in Orléans, and Chlothar I in Soissons.

In 523, Childebert participated with his brothers in a war against Godomar of Burgundy. Chlodomer, the second oldest of Childebert's brothers, died in the Battle of Vézeronce in 524. Thereafter, concerned that Chlodomer's three sons would inherit the kingdom of Orléans, Chlothar and Childebert conspired to oust them. They sent a representative to their mother, Clotilde. The representative presented a pair of scissors and a sword, offering her the choice to shear the three young boys, thereby depriving them of the long hair (considered a symbol of royal power), or to have them killed. She famously replied, "It is better for me to see them dead rather than shorn, if they are not raised to the kingship". After the murder of Chlodomer's two elder children—the youngest, Clodoald, having escaped to a monastic life—Childebert annexed the cities of Chartres and Orléans.

He took part in later various expeditions against the kingdom of Burgundy. He besieged Autun in 532 and, in 534, having conquered the kingdom along with his brother Chlothar and Theuderic's son Theudebert I, received as his share of the spoils of that kingdom the towns of Mâcon, Geneva and Lyons. When Witiges, the king of the Ostrogoths, ceded Provence to the Franks in 535, the possession of Arles and Marseille was guaranteed to Childebert by his brothers. The annexation of that province was completed, with Clotaire's help, in the winter of 536–537.

In 531, he received pleas from his sister Chrotilda, wife of King Amalaric of the Visigoths. The Arian king of Hispania, Chrotilda claimed, was grossly mistreating her, a Catholic. Childebert went down with an army and defeated the Gothic king. Amalaric retreated to Barcelona, where he was assassinated. Chrotilda died on her return journey to Paris of unknown causes.

Childebert made other expeditions against the Visigoths. In 542, he took possession of Pamplona with the help of his brother Clotaire and besieged Zaragoza, but was forced to retreat. From this expedition he brought back to Paris a precious relic, the tunic of Saint Vincent, in honour of which he built at the gates of Paris the famous monastery of Sainte-Croix-et-Saint-Vincent, known later as St-Germain-des-Prés.

He died on 23 December 558, and was buried in the abbey he had founded, where his tomb has been discovered. St-Germain-des-Prés became the royal necropolis for the Neustrian kings until 675. He left two daughters, Chrodoberge and Chrodesinde, by his wife Ultragotha.

Childebert was an acquisitive monarch. He expanded his domains in more foreign wars than any of his brothers, fighting in Burgundy (more than once), Spain (more than once), Provence, and elsewhere in Gaul. Gregory of Tours, a contemporary Neustrian, cites Childebert as saying, further: "Velim unquam Arvernam Lemanem quae tantae jocunditatis gratia refulgere dicitur, oculis cernere" ("Would that I could set eyes on the Auvergne Limagne, which is spoken of so highly").

Childbert was also one of the more religious of the sons of Clovis, having cooperated with his brothers in various wars, rescued his sister after her claims of mistreatment due to her Catholicism, and constructed the famous monastery of Saint Vincent to house his relics—as well as, of course, his own remains and the Neustrian kingly necropolis.

== Sources ==
- Gregory of Tours. The History of the Franks. 2 vol. trans. O. M. Dalton. Oxford: Clarendon Press, 1967.
- Geary, Patrick J. Before France and Germany. Oxford University Press: 1988.

Childebert I Merovingian dynasty Born: 496 Died: 558
Preceded by Clovis I	King of Paris; 511–558	Succeeded by Clotaire I
