= Battle of Vézeronce =

524 battle during the Frankish invasion of Burgundy

Coordinates: 45°20′N 05°30′E

- Part of the invasion of Burgundy
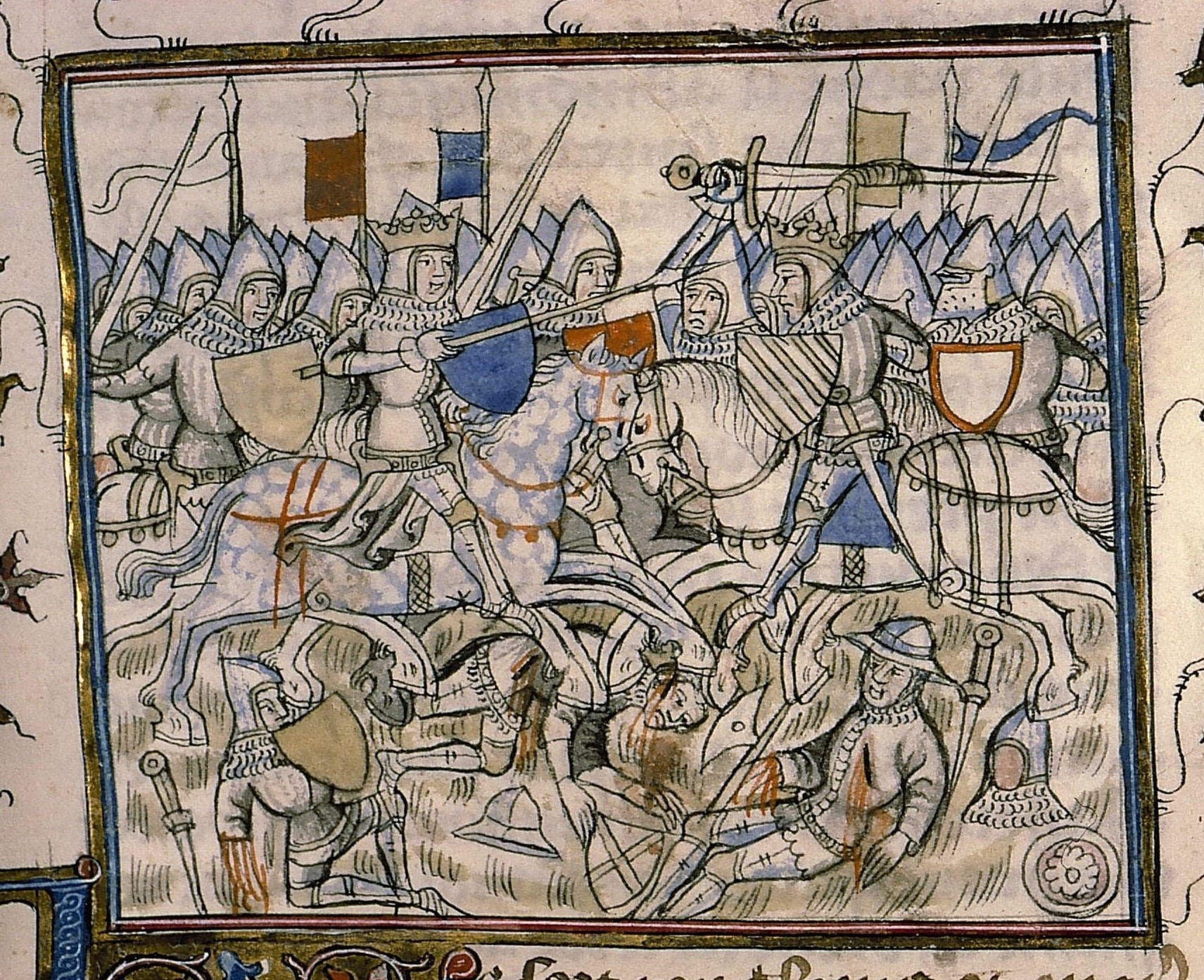
- Illuminated miniature of the battle from a manuscript of the Grandes chroniques de France, 1390-1410
Date	21 June 524 AD
Location	near Vézeronce-Curtin, France
Result	Burgundian victory

Belligerents
Burgundian Kingdom	Frankish Kingdom

Commanders and leaders
Godomar	Chlodomer †

Strength
Unknown	Unknown

Casualties and losses
Unknown	Unknown

The Battle of Vézeronce was fought on 21 June 524 AD near Vézeronce-Curtin (then Veseruntia), now in Isère, France, between the Franks led by King Chlodomer and the Burgundians commanded by King Godomar.

== Background ==
The battle was part of an expedition against the Burgundians initiated by the four sons and heirs of the Frankish king Clovis I: Childebert I, Chlodomer, Chlothar I, and Theuderic I. After a previous incursion by the brothers in 523, Burgundian king Sigismund had been captured and executed, on the orders of Chlodomer, and was succeeded by his brother, Godomar. Chlodomer wanted to seize with his brothers what remained of the Burgundian Kingdom, and resumed his campaign in the spring of 524.

== Battle ==
The two armies clashed near the modern village of Vézeronce, in an area of a vast plain. In Gregory of Tours's account of the battle, the Frankish troops of King Chlodomer quickly took the advantage and repelled the Burgundians led by Godomar. However, believing he was joining a group of Frankish warriors, Chlodomer threw himself into the midst of enemy soldiers and was slain. His head was stuck on a pike and displayed by the Burgundians to their enemies. Godomar won the battle, but his kingdom was lost to the Merovingians within a decade.

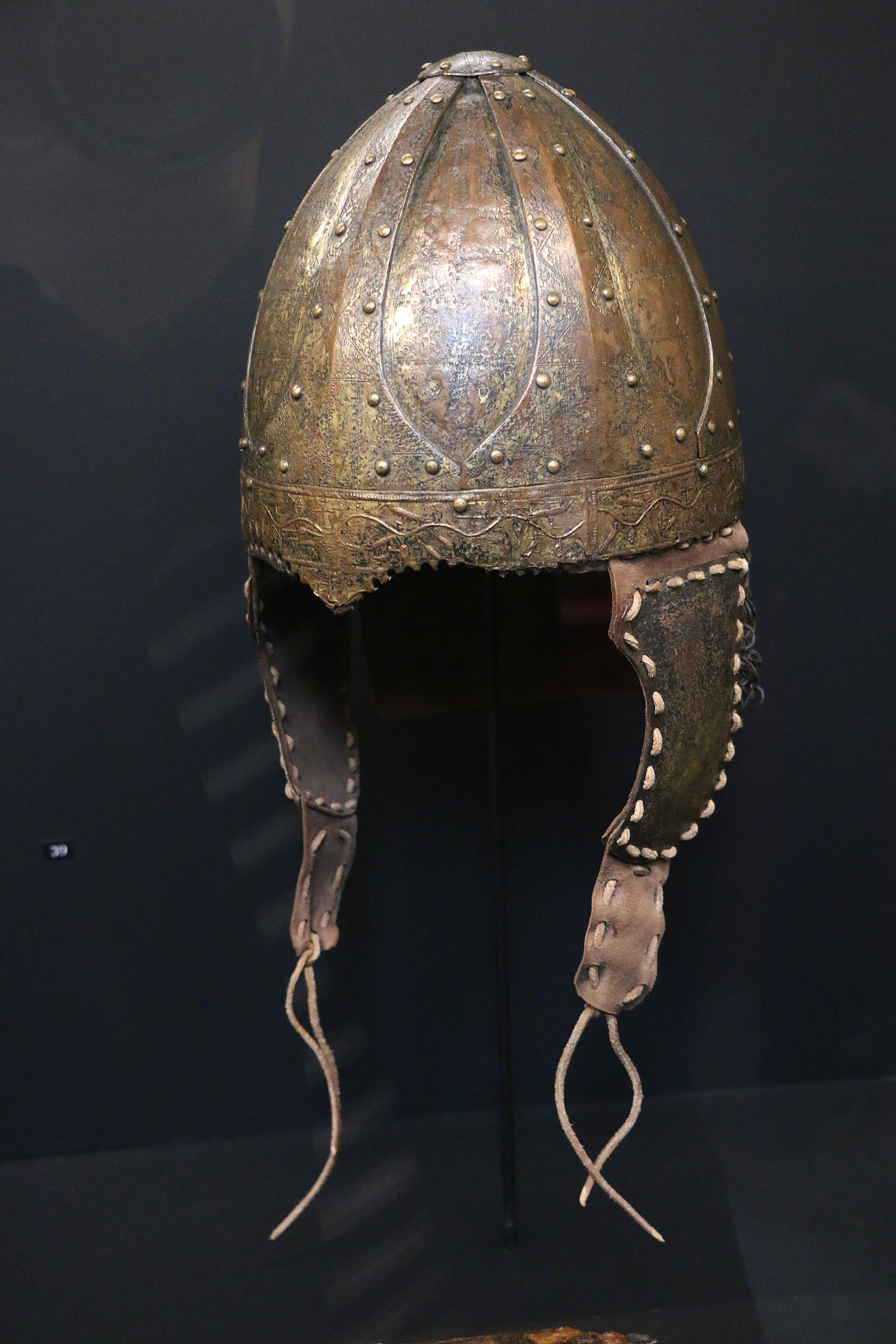
6th-century helmet found near the battlefield of Vézeronce

A helmet was found in the peat marsh of Saint-Didier, to the north of the battle site in 1871, and is conserved in the Musée dauphinois, Grenoble. The helmet is of Byzantine craftsmanship, and was likely that of a Frankish chieftain.

== Sources ==
- Kortum, Han-Henning (2010). "Merovingian Franks". In Rogers, Clifford J. (ed.). The Oxford Encyclopedia of Medieval Warfare and Military Technology. Vol. 1. Oxford University Press.
- Wood, Ian (2014). The Merovingian Kingdoms, 450–751. Routledge.
