= Chlodomer =

King of Orléans (c. 495–524)

Chlodomer *Hludamari
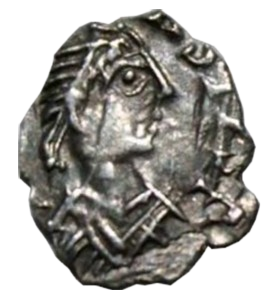
- Coin of Chlodomer with his profile

King of Orléans
- Reign: 511–524
- Predecessor: Clovis I
- Successor: Chlothar I
- Born: c. 495
- Died: 524; Battle of Vézeronce
- Spouse: Guntheuc
- Issue: Theodebald; Gunthar; Clodoald
- House: Merovingian
- Father: Clovis I
- Mother: Clotilde

Chlodomer, also spelled Clodomir or Clodomer (c. 495 – 524), was the second of the four sons of Clovis I, King of the Franks.

== History ==
Clodomir was the eldest son of Clovis and his wife, Clotilde. On the death of his father, in 511, he divided the kingdom of the Franks with his three brothers: Theuderic I, Childebert I, and Chlothar I. Chlodomer became King of the Franks at Orléans. This kingdom included, most notably, the bishoprics of Tours, Poitiers and Orléans. Chlodomer married Guntheuc, with whom he had three sons: Theodebald, Gunthar, and Clodoald.

In 523–24, Chlodomer and his brothers invaded Burgundy, possibly at the instigation of his mother Clotilde, who was eager to avenge the death of her parents who had been allegedly assassinated by her uncle Gundobad, the father of Sigismund of Burgundy. From the sixth century on, the marriage of Clovis and Clotilde was made the theme of epic narratives, in which the original facts were materially altered and the various versions found their way into the works of different Frankish chroniclers. The story of Clotilde's revenge is taken up by Gregory of Tours. It is, however, assumed that this tale is apocryphal.

Nonetheless, Chlodomer joined with his brothers in an expedition against the Burgundians. After capturing Sigismund, Chlodomer returned to Orléans. Chlodomer had Sigismund and his sons Gisald and Gondebaud assassinated in May 524.

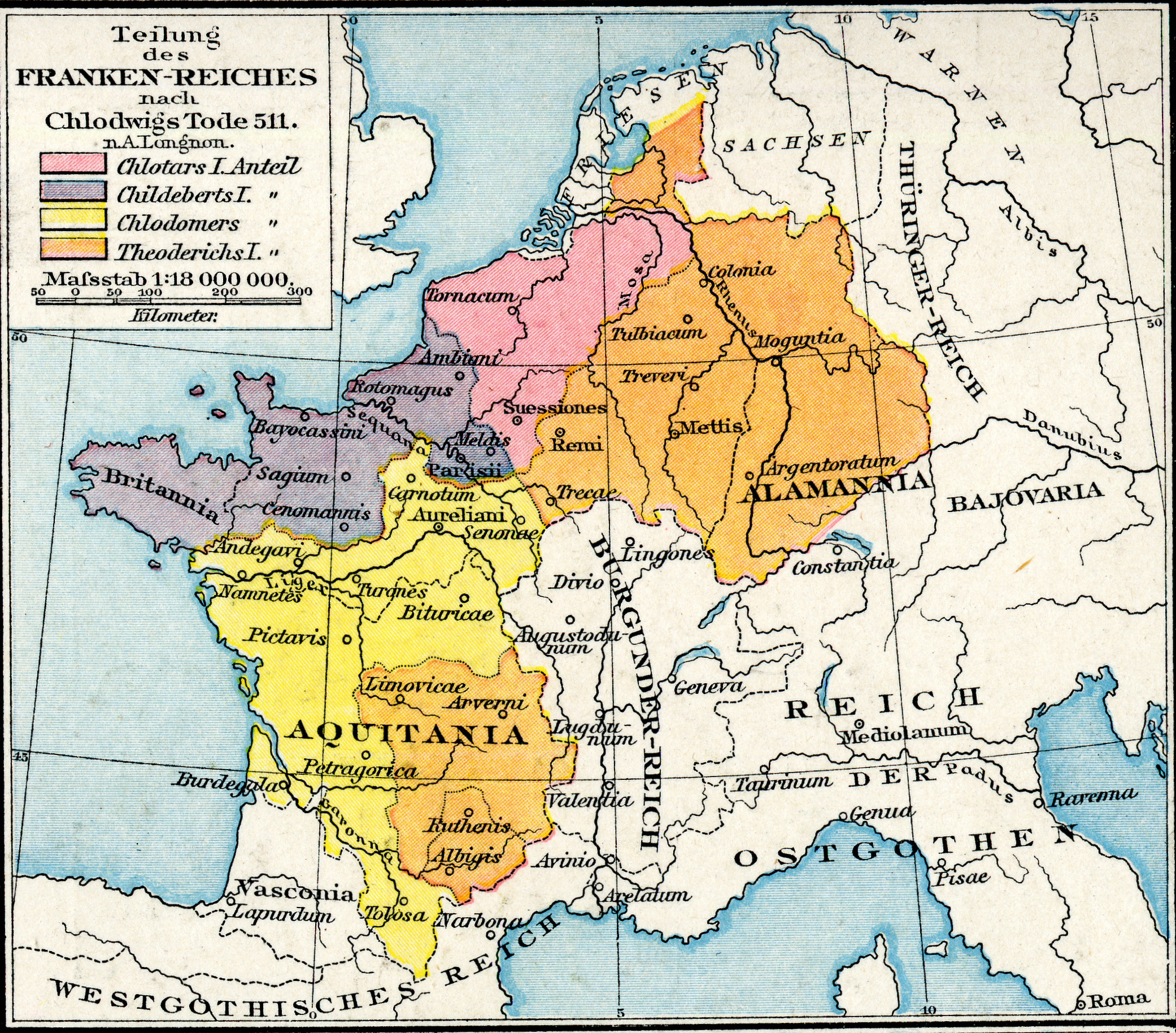
Partition of the kingdom of Clovis

Sigismund's brother Gondomar returned triumphantly to Burgundy at the head of the troops sent by his ally, the Ostrogothic king Theodoric the Great. There, he massacred the garrison the Franks had left behind. Chlodomer then led a second expedition against the Burgundians. He was killed on this expedition, in June that same year, at the Battle of Vézeronce. Theuderic married Sigismund's daughter Suavegotha. Chlodomer's kingdom was divided such that Chlothar I received Touraine and Poitou; Childebert I the territories on both banks of the Loire with Orléans.

When his widow married Chlothar I, Chlodomer's three sons were taken to Paris and entrusted to their grandmother Clotilde. However, Chlothar, not wishing to give them a share of their father's inheritance when they came of age, murdered ten-year-old Theodebald and seven-year-old Gunthar. Only the youngest, Clodoald, was saved by the loyalty of a few of the faithful. Better known as Saint Cloud, he later became abbot of Nogent, having given up his hair, the symbol of the Frankish royalty, rather than giving up his life.

Chlodomer Merovingian dynasty Born: 495 Died: 524
Preceded by Clovis I	King of Orléans; 511–524	Succeeded by Clotaire I
