= Justin (Moesia) =

General of the Byzantine Empire

- Died: 528 AD
- Military career
- Allegiance: Byzantine Empire
- Branch: Byzantine army
- Rank: General

Justin (Latin: Iustinus; Greek: Ἰουστῖνος; died 528) was a general of the Byzantine Empire, active early in the reign of Emperor Justinian I (r. 527–565) as commander of the Danubian limes in Moesia Secunda.

Justin is mentioned in 528 as "stratelates of Moesia". He probably held the title of dux Moesiae Secundae and the rank of magister militum. He joined forces with Baduarius, dux of Scythia Minor, in battle against a force of foreign invaders, who John Malalas identifies as "Huns", while Theophanes the Confessor identifies as Bulgars. Justin was killed in that battle and was succeeded in his post by Constantiolus.

== Sources ==
- Martindale, John R., ed. (1992). The Prosopography of the Later Roman Empire: Volume III, AD 527–641. Cambridge: Cambridge University Press. ISBN 0-521-20160-8.
