= Constantiolus =

General of the Byzantine Empire

Constantiolus (Greek: Κωνσταντίολος) was a general of the Byzantine Empire, active early in the reign of Justinian I (r. 527–565). He succeeded Justin in command of Moesia Secunda. A passage of Theophanes the Confessor incorrectly identifies him as "Constantinus" (Constantine).

== Biography ==
=== Origins and early career: dux of Moesia ===
According to John Malalas and Theophanes the Confessor, the father of Constantiolus was named Florentius. No details are given about him, though he could be identified with Florentius, Roman consul in 515.

Constantiolus is first mentioned as "stratelates of Moesia" in 528, in succession to Justin, who had been killed in battle earlier that year. Justin and Baduarius, dux of Scythia Minor, had joined their forces in battle against a force of foreign invaders, who Malalas identifies as "Huns", while Theophanes as Bulgars. It is likely that Constantiolus held the title of dux Moesiae Secundae and the rank of magister militum (often rendered in Greek as stratelates).

The newly appointed Constantiolus joined forces with Ascum and Godilas in facing the invaders, who were at the time active in Thrace. The Byzantine army managed to defeat one group of invaders in battle, but they were then ambushed and routed by a second group of Huns/Bulgars. Both Constantiolus and Ascum were captured by their enemies. The victors ransomed Constantiolus back to Justinian I in exchange for a large sum. Malalas reports a payment of 10,000 solidi, while Theophanes of 1,000 solidi.

=== Imperial representative ===
Constantiolus resurfaces in 531, after Belisarius' defeat by the Sassanid Persians at the Battle of Callinicum (19 April 531). Justinian sent Constantiolus to the eastern border, assigning him to investigate the circumstances of the defeat. Constantiolus traveled through Antioch and questioned various Byzantine commanders on the subject. Among them was the magister officiorum Hermogenes, who had served under Belisarius in the battle. Constantiolus returned to Constantinople with his findings. His report probably contributed to the end of Belisarius' service as magister militum per Orientem and his replacement by Mundus.

=== The Nika riots ===
Constantiolus next appears during the Nika riots in 532, where he, along with Mundus and Basilides, served as envoys of Justinian to the rioting crowds. They partly attempted to calm the rioters and partly attempted to understand the causes of their wrath. Their report to the emperor placed the blame for the uprising on the unpopular financial ministers John the Cappadocian, Tribonian and Eudaemon, leading to their dismissal from office.

The riots did not subside, and Justinian allegedly considered fleeing Constantinople until the Empress Theodora convinced him to stay and defend his throne. Constantiolus and Mundus, who were to have guarded the palace in the emperor's absence, instead joined Belisarius in attacking rioters massed in the Hippodrome of Constantinople. The event ended the Nika riots and also seems to be the last chronological mention of Constantiolus.

== Sources ==
- Diehl, Charles. Theodora, Empress of Byzantium ((c) 1972 by Frederick Ungar Publishing, Inc., transl. by S.R. Rosenbaum from the original French Theodora, Imperatice de Byzance). Popular account based on the author's extensive scholarly research.
- Martindale, John R., ed. (1992). The Prosopography of the Later Roman Empire: Volume III, AD 527–641. Cambridge: Cambridge University Press. ISBN 0-521-20160-8.
