= Clodoald =

Frankish monk and bishop

Saint Clodoald
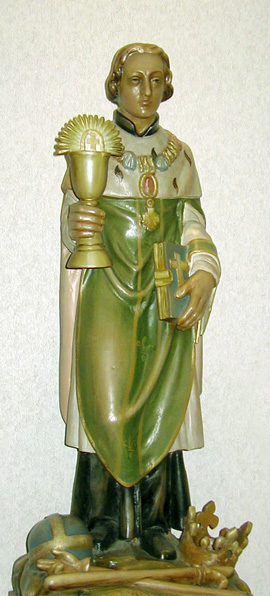
- Modern statue of Saint Cloud as prince in St. Cloud Hospital, Minnesota

Abbot, Confessor
- Born: 522
- Died: c. 560; Nogent-sur-Seine, Kingdom of the Franks (now France)
- Venerated in: Eastern Orthodox Church; Roman Catholic Church
- Major shrine: Saint-Cloud, France
- Feast: 7 September
- Attributes: A Benedictine abbot giving his hood to a poor man as a halo emanates from his head; with royal insignia at his feet, or instructing the poor
- Patronage: Against carbuncles; nail makers; Diocese of Saint Cloud, Minnesota; France

Clodoald (Latin: C(h)lodoaldus, Cloudus; reconstructed Frankish: *Hlōdōwald; 522 – c. 560 AD), better known as Saint Cloud (French: [klu]), was a Merovingian prince, grandson of Clovis I and son of Chlodomer, who preferred to renounce royalty and became a hermit and monk. Clodoald found a hill along the Seine, two leagues below Paris, in a place called Novigentum (the present commune of Saint-Cloud). Here, among the fishermen and farmers, he led a life of solitude and prayer, and built a church, which he dedicated in honor of Martin of Tours.

He is venerated as a saint in both the Eastern Orthodox Church and Roman Catholic Church.

== Background ==
Upon the death of Clovis, his sons, Chlodomer, Childebert, Clothaire, and their half-brother Thierry shared the kingdom. In 523–524, at Clotilde's instigation, her sons joined in an expedition against King Sigismund's Burgundians. After the arrest of Sigismund and his family, Chlodomer returned to Orléans. Sigismund's brother, Godomar III, supported by his ally and relative, the Ostrogoth king Theodoric the Great, slaughtered the garrison the Franks had left in Burgundy. In retaliation, Chlodomer then had Sigismund and his sons, Gisald and Gondebaud, murdered. On May 1, 524, Chlodomer set out on a second expedition against the Burgundians and was killed at the Battle of Vézeronce on June 25 of the same year.

== Early life ==
Clodoald was the son of King Chlodomer of Orléans and his wife Guntheuc. He was one of three brothers, raised in Paris by their grandmother, the queen dowager Clotilde. Salic law required the division of the kingdom among the sons of Chlodomer. However, the boys' uncles, Childebert I, king of Paris, and his brother Clotaire I, king of Soissons, coveted the kingdom of Orléans and determined to murder the nephews.

By one account, in 525, Childebert and Clotaire asked their mother Clotilde to send them the children so that they might be proclaimed their father's successors. She clothed the brothers in their best clothes and sent them with confidence, unaware of her sons' plans. The two uncles then had the children of Clodomir killed. Some claim that they killed the two older boys, Thibault and Gonthaire, aged ten and seven, with their own hands, to the great despair of Saint Clotilde, who saw her grandchildren killed by her own sons. Only the youngest, Clodoald, was saved by the dedication of a few of the faithful. He found sanctuary with Remigius, the Bishop of Rheims, and thus escaped his uncles' searches.

Another account states that Childebert and Clotaire considered cutting children's hair, because long hair was a sign of nobility in Frankish culture. But as the hair would inevitably grow back, they asked Clotilde what they had to do. She replied that she would rather see them dead than sheared. They first killed Gonthaire, before Thibault threw himself at their feet to beg them to leave him alive. So Childebert hesitated, and his brother reminded him that it was his idea. Thus ended the short life of Clodomir's descendants, at least two of the three since Clodoald had been able to escape.

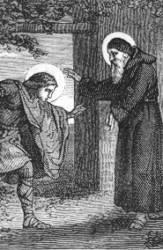
Saint Cloud meets Saint Séverin.

== Adulthood ==
Clodoald renounced all claims to the throne and lived as a studious hermit and disciple of Séverin of Paris, who led a solitary and contemplative life in a hermitage at the gates of Paris (on the site of the present Saint-Séverin Church in the 5th arrondissement). The young prince became his disciple and received from his hands the religious habit. Clodoald preferred a humble and quiet life of solitude, to a bright, but perilous life in a royal palace. For some time he remained in his company, to be trained in all the monastic virtues. At the age of twenty, Clodoald left his hermitage and appeared before the Bishop of Paris surrounded by religious and civic leaders and members of the royal family. The bishop cut Cloud's long hair, which was a symbol of his royalty. Childebert and Clotaire, who saw him as no threat, left him undisturbed and even gave him some inheritances to live more comfortably in the place of his retirement.

After Séverin's death, Clodoald left the surroundings of Paris and secretly retired to Provence. The inhabitants of the surrounding area came to him because they learned that Cloud had the gift of healing. Clodoald remained there eleven years, and then went back to his first hermitage, where the people greeted his return with joy.

At the people's request, he was ordained a priest by Bishop Eusebius of Paris in 551 and served the Church for some time. His humility and his charity were praised. Clodoald could not endure these honours for long, and to avoid them, retired to a hill along the Seine, two leagues below Paris, in a place called Novigentum (the present commune of Saint-Cloud). Here among the fishermen and farmers, he led a life of solitude and prayer, and built a church, which he dedicated in honor of Martin of Tours.

As soon as the place of his retreat was known, disciples came to place themselves under his direction. Some cells were first built, soon a monastery became necessary. According to tradition, Clodoald had a monastery with a chapel built and endowed with the goods that the kings, his uncles, gave him. He lived seven years in his monastery, among his brothers, giving them an example of all the virtues. He died there on September 7, 560, at the age of thirty-eight.

== Veneration ==
According to legend, Clodoald predicted his death in advance, which was followed by several miracles, which occurred near his tomb. Clodoald was then canonized and the hamlet quickly transformed into a place of pilgrimage, where huge crowds flocked. Novigentum then changed its name to "Sanctus Clodoaldus" (Saint-Cloud) in his honour. The abbey is now a collegiate church of canons regular called Église Saint-Clodoald wherein his relics are kept. St. Cloud, Wisconsin, St. Cloud, Florida, and St. Cloud, Minnesota, are in turn named after the French town.

Clodoald's feast day is September 7.

== In art ==
- There is a statue of St. Cloud on the portal of Saint-Germain l'Auxerrois in Paris.
- In his History of the Franks, Gregory of Tours recounts the struggles for power between the children of Clovis, and after having mentioned the murder of his two brothers, dedicates a few lines to Clodoald: "They could not take the third, Clodoald, who was saved by the help of brave warriors; despising an earthly kingdom, he consecrated himself to God, and, having cut his hair with his own hand, he was made a cleric. He persisted in good works, and died a priest."
- A painting by Sébastien-Melchior Cornu (1804–1870) depicting Saint-Clodoald decorates the chapel of the Elysée Palace.

== See also ==
- Forced monasticism
- Saint-Cloud, French commune, former Novigentum
