= 500s (decade) =

Decade

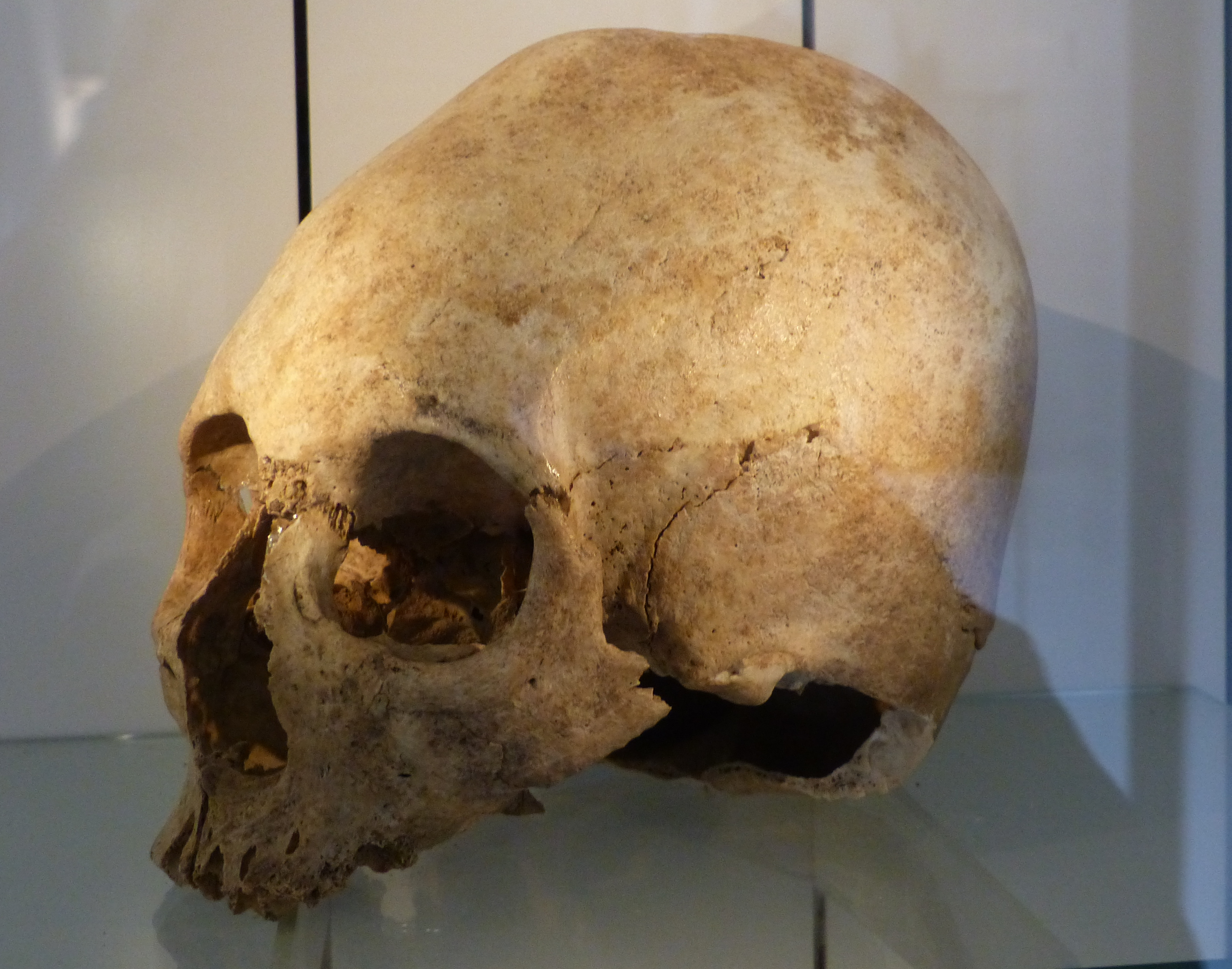
Regensburg ( Upper Palatinate ). Historic Museum: Artificially deformed skull ( 500 AD ) from a hun´s grave at the cemetery in Regensburg-Irlmauth

The 500s decade ran from January 1, 500, to December 31, 509.

== Events ==
=== By place ===
==== Byzantine Empire ====
- Emperor Anastasius I concludes treaties with a number of nomad tribes in northern Arabia. In return for tribute to the Byzantine Empire and military defense of these eastern territories, such tribes are permitted to settle and farm agricultural lands in Arabia (approximate date).

Britannia

- Possible date for the Battle of Mons Badonicus: Romano-British and Celts defeat an Anglo-Saxon army, that may have been led by the bretwalda Aelle of Sussex or possibly Cerdic of Wessex (approximate date; suggested dates range from 490 to 517). This battle may have influenced the legend of King Arthur.
- Possible date at which Fergus Mór begins his reign – the historicity of Mór is doubtful.
- Approximate beginning of the Heptarchy period in the history of England.
- Approximate year of the founding of the Kingdom of Essex.
- Approximate year of the invention of the bee skep in Ireland.

==== Europe ====
- Burgundian Civil War: Battle of Dijon: A coalition of Franks and Burgundians crush the forces under Gundobad. King Clovis I pursues him to Avignon, where he surrenders and promises to pay a yearly tribute.
- The Frankish Kingdom is formed (approximate date).
- The monument of Ale's Stones is built in Sweden (approximate date).
- Roman catacomb burials end (approximate date).

==== Africa ====
- Thrasamund, king of the Vandals, marries Amalafrida (widowed sister of Theodoric the Great). She brings with her a large dowry and an elite Gothic force of 5,000 soldiers.
- Traders from southern Arabia settle in northern Ethiopia.

==== Asia ====
- Jijeung becomes king of the Korean kingdom of Silla.

==== Mesoamerica ====
- Tikal is founded (approximate date).
- Uxmal is founded (approximate date).

North America

- First large pit house villages at Chaco Canyon are founded (approximate date).

=== By topic ===
==== Religion ====
- The Arian Baptistry is erected by Theodoric the Great, at the same time as the Basilica of Sant' Apollinare Nuovo (Ravenna).
- The Codex Argenteus, Gothic manuscript of bishop Ulfilas's translation of the Bible, is written (approximate date).

=== By place ===
==== Britannia ====
- Domangart Réti succeeds his father Fergus Mór, after he dies during a campaign against the Picts. He becomes the new king of Dál Riata (modern Scotland) (according to the Annals of Tigernach).

==== Europe ====
- Burgundian Civil War: King Gundobad breaks his promise of tribute and regains his military power. He besieges his brother Godegisel at the city of Vienne (Burgundy), and murders him in an Arian church along with the bishop.

==== Asia ====
- Dong Hun Hou is killed during a siege of the capital Jiankang. He is succeeded by his brother Qi He Di, who becomes emperor of Southern Qi (China).
- Muryeong becomes king of Baekje (one of the Three Kingdoms of Korea). During his reign, the kingdom remains allied with Silla and expands its relationships with China and Japan.

==== Central America ====
- June 5 – Ahkal Moʼ Nahb I becomes the new ruler of the Mayan city-state of Palenque (in what is now the state of Chiapas in southern Mexico), and reigns until his death in 524.
- The Maya are peaking in economic prosperity. The civilization at Teotihuacan begins to decline and its people are migrating to the greatest Mayan city, Tikal, bringing with them ideas about weaponry and new ritual practices.

=== By topic ===
==== Medicine ====
- The Sushruta Samhita medical book becomes a classic of medicine in India. The book contains descriptions of surgery, illnesses, medicinal plants, and a detailed study on anatomy (approximate date).

==== Religion ====
- Pope Symmachus, accused of various crimes by secular authorities who support an ecclesiastical opponent, asserts that the secular ruler has no jurisdiction over him. A synod held in 502 will confirm that view.

=== By place ===
==== Byzantine Empire ====
- War with Sassanid Persia: Emperor Anastasius I refuses to pay a share of the cost of defending the Caucasian Gates, through which nomadic tribes have come for raids on Persia and the Byzantine Empire. King Kavadh I invades Armenia and captures Theodosiopolis.
- Winter – Kavadh I besieges the fortress-city of Amida (modern Turkey). The defenders, although unsupported by Byzantine troops, repel the Persian assaults for three months before they are finally beaten.

==== Europe ====
- March 29 – King Gundobad issues a new legal code (Lex Burgundionum) at Lyon, that makes Gallo-Romans and Burgundians subject to the same laws (approximate date).
- The Bulgars ravage Thrace. A semi-nomadic people, they have absorbed the surviving Huns and meet no opposition from Byzantine forces.

==== China ====
- The Liang Dynasty is founded by Xiao Yan, who marches on Jiankang (later Nanjing). Emperor He Di, age 14, is put to death. The Southern Qi Dynasty ends and Wu Di becomes ruler of the Liang Dynasty.
- December 24 - Xiao Yan names Xiao Tong his heir designate.
- The Nanhua Temple, located southeast of Shaoguan, is founded by the Indian monk Zhiyao Sanzang. The temple covers an area of 42.5 hectares (105 acres) and consists of a set of historical Buddhist buildings.

=== By topic ===
==== Arts and sciences ====
- The Persian philosopher Mazdak declares private property to be the source of all evil.

==== Literature ====
- The Chinese Book of Song is finished. The text is one of the Twenty-Four Histories, a traditional collection of historical records during the Southern and Northern Dynasties.

==== Religion ====
- Caesarius becomes bishop of Arles. His episcopal see, near the mouth of the Rhone River and close to Marseille, retains its ancient importance in the social and commercial life of Gaul for forty years.
- October 23 – The Synodus Palmaris, called by Gothic king Theodoric the Great, clears Pope Symmachus of all charges, thus ending the schism of Antipope Laurentius.

=== Byzantine Empire ===
- War with Sassanid Persia: Emperor Anastasius I sends a Byzantine army (52,000 men) to Armenia, but is defeated. The Romans attempt an unsuccessful siege of the Persian-held city Amida, on the Tigris. King Kavadh I invades Osroene, and lays siege to the city of Edessa (Northern Mesopotamia).
- May – Areobindus, Byzantine general (magister militum), is stationed as commander at Dara, with an army of 12,000 men to keep watch at the Persian stronghold of Nisibis (modern Turkey).

=== Palestine ===
- Mundhir III, king of the Lakhmids (Arab Christians), raids Palaestina Salutaris and Arabia Petraea. He captures a large number of Romans.

=== Europe ===
- King Ernakh, third son of Attila the Hun, dies after a 34-year reign. He is succeeded by his two sons (Utigur and Kutrigur), who share the power with the unified Bulgars.

=== By place ===
==== Byzantine Empire ====
- War with Sassanid Persia: Emperor Anastasius I gains the upper hand in Armenia, with the renewed investment of Amida.
- King Kavadh I hands over the fortress-city of Amida, and agrees to an armistice with the Byzantine Empire.

==== Europe ====
- King Theodoric the Great defeats the Gepids, and drives them out of their homeland (Pannonia).
- The Ostrogoths sack Belgrade, on the Danube and Sava rivers (modern Serbia).

==== Mesoamerica ====
- A major expansion of Copán's ceremonial center, the Acropolis complex, is undertaken by B'alam Nehn (Waterlily Jaguar), the seventh ruler (ajaw) of the southeastern Maya city (approximate date).

=== By topic ===
==== Religion ====
- Theodoric the Great builds the Basilica of Sant'Apollinare Nuovo, originally dedicated to Christ the Redeemer.

=== By place ===
==== Byzantine Empire ====
- Emperor Anastasius I agrees to pay his share of the cost of defending the Caucasian Gates, against nomadic invasions from East Asia.
- Anastasius I decides to rebuild the village of Dara (Northern Mesopotamia). He constructs a new strategic fortress to guard the frontier.
- The white Huns (Hephthalites) from the Caucasus invade the Persian Empire.

==== Vietnam ====
- Lý Nguyên Khải, Jiaozhou's governor, rebels against the Liang dynasty, but is suppressed by Lý Tắc, a state official, and subsequently prosecuted.

=== By place ===
==== Byzantine Empire ====
- November – Emperor Anastasius I accepts a peace agreement with the Sasanian Empire (Persia), based on the status quo. He upgrades the fortifications at Batnae, Edessa and Amida (Northern Mesopotamia).

==== Europe ====
- February 2 – King Alaric II issues the "Lex Romana Visigothorum" or Breviary of Alaric, an abstract of Roman laws and imperial decrees, compiled by a commission appointed to provide a law code for Alaric's Roman subjects. The "Lex Romana" will be the standard for justice in the Visigothic realm.
- The Visigoths capture the city of Dertosa in Catalonia. They arrest and execute the Roman usurper Peter, sending his head as a trophy to Zaragoza (Spain).

=== By topic ===
==== Religion ====
- September 10 – Council of Agde: The bishops of Visigothic Gaul under the presidency of Caesarius of Arles meet.
- Antipope Laurentius is persuaded by Theodoric the Great to resign his claim to the throne of Pope Symmachus, ending a schism in the Catholic Church; Laurentius then fasts until his death.

=== By place ===
==== Byzantine Empire ====
- Emperor Anastasius I completes the strategic fortress at Dara (Northern Mesopotamia). He raises the city walls to 30 feet (10 m), disregarding Persian protests. Alarmed by the depredations of Slavs and Bulgars in Thrace, he builds the Anastasian Wall from the Black Sea to Propontis, across the narrow peninsula near Constantinople (modern Turkey).

==== Europe ====
- Battle of Vouillé: A Frankish army under command of Clovis I invades the Visigothic Kingdom, and defeats King Alaric II near Poitiers. The Visigoths refuse to be enslaved, and retreat to Septimania (Southern Gaul). Clovis annexes Aquitania, and captures Toulouse.
- Gesalec succeeds his father Alaric II as king of the Visigoths. He establishes his residence at Narbonne and is supported by an alliance with the Ostrogothic king Theodoric the Great.
- Clovis I dictates the Salic Law (Code of the Barbaric Laws) to the Franks (a written codification of civil law for citizens of the Frankish Kingdom).
- Hermanafrid, king of the Thuringi, marries Amalaberga. He begins his rule, shared with his brothers Baderic and Bertachar.
- Wooden coffins and wooden tools are used in the burial places of the Alemanni.

==== Asia ====
- The town of Guilin, China, is renamed Guizhou.
- Battle of Zhongli: army of Liang dynasty led by Wei Rui decisively defeated army of Northern Wei
- Keitai becomes the 26th emperor of Japan (according to the Nihon Shoki).
- The first and smaller of the two Buddhas of Bamyan is erected in central Afghanistan.

==== Mesoamerica ====
- A Mayan altar with the head of the death god is built in Copán, Honduras.

=== By place ===
==== Byzantine Empire ====
- Emperor Anastasius I formally recognizes Clovis I of the Salian Franks as ruler of Gaul. He sends a Byzantine fleet of 100 warships to raid the coasts of Italy.

==== Britannia ====
- Battle of Netley: King Cerdic of Wessex moves with an Anglo-Saxon army inland, and defeats the British king, Nudd-Lludd (according to the Anglo-Saxon Chronicle).
- Winter – All the rivers in England are frozen for more than two months.

==== Europe ====
- King Clovis I fails in an effort to take the walled city of Carcassonne (Southern Gaul). He establishes Paris (Lutetia) as his capital and gets baptized, making Roman Catholicism the official religion of the Kingdom of the Franks.
- King Theodoric the Great sends an Ostrogoth army, led by his sword-bearer Theudis, drives the Franks out of Provence, and recovers Septimania (Languedoc) from the Visigoths.

=== By place ===
==== Europe ====
- Clovis I (Chlodowech) becomes the first Catholic king of the Franks, uniting all the Frankish tribes under his rule. He controls an immense territory in Gaul (modern France), and delivers a major blow for the Church against the Arian heresy.

== Births ==
500

- Kaleb of Axum, Aksumite king responsible for the destruction of Himyar
- Antalas, Berber tribal leader (approximate date)
- Aregund, queen of the Franks (approximate date)
- Belisarius, Byzantine general (approximate date)
- Bhavyaviveka, Indian Madhyamaka scholar (approximate date)
- Clotilde, daughter of Clovis I (approximate date)
- David, Welsh bishop (approximate date)
- Erzhu Shilong, high-official of Northern Wei (d. 532)
- Gildas, British cleric (approximate date)
- Marcouf, missionary and saint (approximate date)
- Nonnosus, abbot and saint (approximate date)
- Octa, king of Kent (approximate date)
- Procopius, Byzantine historian (approximate date)
- Paul the Black, Syriac Orthodox Patriarch of Antioch (approximate date)
- Theodora, Byzantine Empress (approximate date)
- Theudebert I, king of Austrasia (or 495)
- Tribonian, Byzantine jurist (approximate date)
- Xie He, Chinese writer and art historian (approximate date)

501

- Lou Zhaojun, empress dowager of Northern Qi (d. 562)
- Xiao Tong, crown prince of the Liang Dynasty (d. 531)

502

- Amalaric, king of the Visigoths (d. 531)

503

- October 17 – Lý Nam Đế, first emperor of Vietnam (d. 548)
- December 2 – Xiao Gang, later Emperor Jianwen of Liang, emperor of the Chinese Liang dynasty (killed 551)
- Chen Baxian, later Emperor Wu of Chen, first emperor of the Chinese Chen dynasty (d. 559)

505

- Belisarius, Byzantine general (d. 565)
- Dorotheus of Gaza, Christian monk and abbot (approximate date)
- Dynod Bwr, king of Hen Ogledd (approximate date)
- Varāhamihira, Indian astronomer and mathematician (d. 587)
- Saint Yared, Axumite composer (d. 571)

506

- Soga no Iname, leader of the Soga clan (d. 570)
- Wei Shou, Chinese author (d. 572)
- Zhang Yao'er, empress of Chen dynasty China (d. 570)

507

- John of Ephesus, Armenian bishop (approximate date)
- Wen Di, emperor of Western Wei (d. 551)
- Xiao Zhuang Di, emperor of Northern Wei (d. 531)
- Yuwen Tai, general of Western Wei (d. 556)

508

- September 16 – Yuan Di, emperor of the Liang Dynasty (d. 555)
- Xiao Ji, prince of the Liang Dynasty (d. 553)

509

- Kinmei, emperor of Japan (d. 571)
- Wei Xiaokuan, general of Western Wei (d. 580)

== Deaths ==
500

- March 29 – Gwynllyw, Welsh king and religious figure
- Dauí Tenga Uma, king of Connacht (Ireland)
- Zu Chongzhi, Chinese mathematician (b. 429)

501

- April 25 – Rusticus, archbishop of Lyon
- Dongseong, king of Baekje (Korea)
- Fergus Mór, king of Dál Riata (Scotland)
- Godegisel, king of the Burgundians
- Pan Yunu, concubine of Xiao Baojuan
- Ravina II, Jewish Talmudist and rabbi
- Su Xiaoxiao, Chinese Gējì and poet
- Xiao Baojuan, emperor of Southern Qi (b. 483)
- Teudelinda, Burgundian queen consort

502

- Genevieve, patron saint of Paris (approximate date)
- He Di, Chinese emperor of Southern Qi (b. 488)
- Narsai, Syrian poet and theologian (approximate date)
- Vakhtang I, Georgian king (approximate date)

503

- Ernakh, king of the Huns

504

- Muyal Jol, ruler of Copan

505

- Eugenius, bishop of Carthage
- John I, Coptic Orthodox patriarch of Alexandria

506

- Buretsu, emperor of Japan
- Peter, Roman usurper in Spain

507

- Alaric II, king of the Visigoths
- Aprus, bishop of Toul
- Domangart Réti, king of Dál Riata (modern Scotland)
- Yu, empress of Northern Wei (b. 488)

508

- Geraint, king of Dumnonia (approximate date)
- Natanleod, king of Wales
- Yuan Xie, prince of the Northern Wei Dynasty
- Yujiulü Futu, ruler (khan) of the Rouran (Mongolia)

509

- Chlodoric, king of the Ripuarian Franks
- Sigobert the Lame, king of the Ripuarian Franks
