= 507 =

Calendar year

507 in various calendars
- Gregorian calendar: 507; DVII
- Ab urbe condita: 1260
- Assyrian calendar: 5257
- Balinese saka calendar: 428–429
- Bengali calendar: −87 – −86
- Berber calendar: 1457
- Buddhist calendar: 1051
- Burmese calendar: −131
- Byzantine calendar: 6015–6016
- Chinese calendar: 丙戌年 (Fire Dog); 3204 or 2997 — to — 丁亥年 (Fire Pig); 3205 or 2998
- Coptic calendar: 223–224
- Discordian calendar: 1673
- Ethiopian calendar: 499–500
- Hebrew calendar: 4267–4268
- Hindu calendars
- Vikram Samvat: 563–564
- Shaka Samvat: 428–429
- Kali Yuga: 3607–3608
- Holocene calendar: 10507
- Iranian calendar: 115 BP – 114 BP
- Islamic calendar: 119 BH – 118 BH
- Javanese calendar: 393–394
- Julian calendar: 507; DVII
- Korean calendar: 2840
- Minguo calendar: 1405 before ROC 民前1405年
- Nanakshahi calendar: −961
- Seleucid era: 818/819 AG
- Thai solar calendar: 1049–1050
- Tibetan calendar: མེ་ཕོ་ཁྱི་ལོ་ (male Fire-Dog); 633 or 252 or −520 — to — མེ་མོ་ཕག་ལོ་ (female Fire-Boar); 634 or 253 or −519

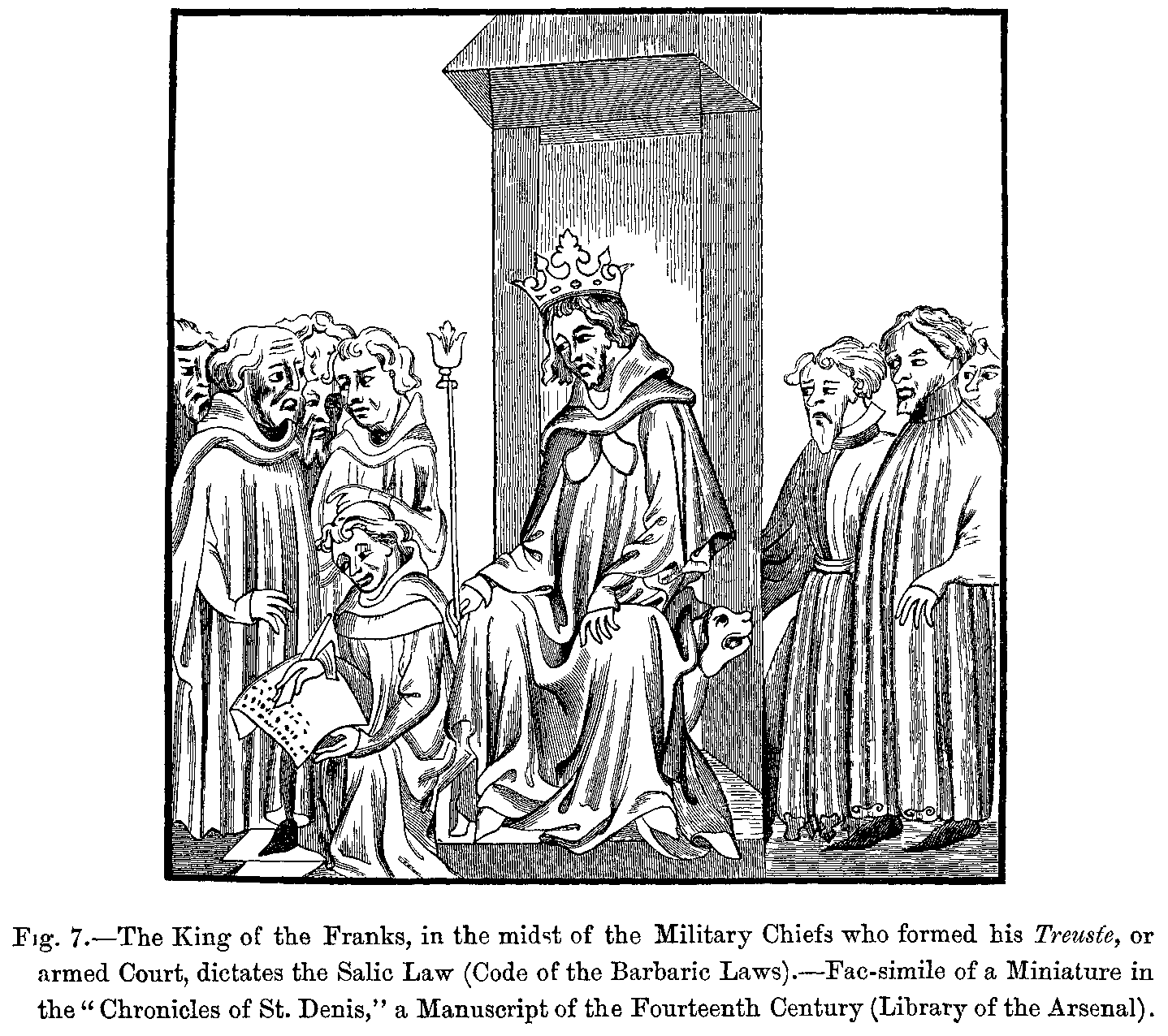
King Clovis I dictates the Salic Law

Year 507 (DVII) was a common year starting on Monday of the Julian calendar. At the time, it was known in the Roman Empire as the Year of the Consulship of Anastasius and Venantius (or, less frequently, year 1260 Ab urbe condita). The denomination 507 for this year has been used since the early medieval period, when the Anno Domini calendar era became the prevalent method in Europe for naming years.

== Events ==
=== By place ===
==== Byzantine Empire ====
- Emperor Anastasius I completes the strategic fortress at Dara (Northern Mesopotamia). He raises the city walls to 30 feet (10 m), disregarding Persian protests. Alarmed by the depredations of Slavs and Bulgars in Thrace, he builds the Anastasian Wall from the Black Sea to Propontis, across the narrow peninsula near Constantinople (modern Turkey).

==== Europe ====
- Battle of Vouillé: A Frankish army under command of Clovis I invades the Visigothic Kingdom, and defeats King Alaric II near Poitiers. The Visigoths refuse to be enslaved, and retreat to Septimania (Southern Gaul). Clovis annexes Aquitania, and captures Toulouse.
- Gesalec succeeds his father Alaric II as king of the Visigoths. He establishes his residence at Narbonne and is supported by an alliance with the Ostrogothic king Theodoric the Great.
- Clovis I dictates the Salic Law (Code of the Barbaric Laws) to the Franks (a written codification of civil law for citizens of the Frankish Kingdom).
- Hermanafrid, king of the Thuringi, marries Amalaberga. He begins his rule, shared with his brothers Baderic and Bertachar.
- Wooden coffins and wooden tools are used in the burial places of the Alemanni.

==== Asia ====
- The town of Guilin, China, is renamed Guizhou.
- Battle of Zhongli: army of Liang dynasty led by Wei Rui decisively defeated army of Northern Wei
- Keitai becomes the 26th emperor of Japan (according to the Nihon Shoki).
- The first and smaller of the two Buddhas of Bamyan is erected in central Afghanistan.

==== Mesoamerica ====
- A Mayan altar with the head of the death god is built in Copán, Honduras.

== Births ==
- John of Ephesus, Armenian bishop (approximate date)
- Wen Di, emperor of Western Wei (d. 551)
- Xiao Zhuang Di, emperor of Northern Wei (d. 531)
- Yuwen Tai, general of Western Wei (d. 556)

== Deaths ==
- Alaric II, king of the Visigoths
- Aprus, bishop of Toul
- Domangart Réti, king of Dál Riata (modern Scotland)
- Yu, empress of Northern Wei (b. 488)
