= The Deeds of the Saxons =

10th-century German chronicle

The Deeds of the Saxons, or Three Books of Annals (Latin: Res gestae Saxonicae sive annalium libri tres) is a three-volume chronicle of 10th-century Germany, written by Widukind of Corvey. Widukind, proud of his people and history, begins his chronicon, not with Rome, but with a brief synopsis derived from the orally-transmitted history of the Saxons, with a terseness that makes his work difficult to interpret. Widukind omits Italian events in tracing the career of Henry the Fowler and he never mentioned a pope.

== Manuscripts ==
Widukind's Gesta is known from five manuscripts, one of which came to light at the beginning of the twentieth century. The contexts and dates of the various versions which these represent have occasioned much discussion. The work was first completed in 967 or 968, when it was dedicated to Mathilda, the young daughter of Otto the Great and newly appointed abbess of Quedlinburg. However, in four of five manuscripts, the history was continued down to 973 (adding chapters 70-6 of Book III), whether by Widukind himself or by another author. Since its composition must have been a long process, it is likely that the dedication was not originally part of Widukind's design and that he consequently had to make a number of adjustments to suit other needs. Three main recensions called A, B and C have been distinguished:

- Recension A. Ends at Book III, chapter 69, year 967/9.
  - MS A. MS J 38 (Sächsischen Landesbibliothek, Dresden). Date: 1200 x 1220.
- Recension B (continues until 973)
  - MS B 1. MS Addit. 21109 (British Library, London), pp. 138–181. Date: mid-12th century.
  - MS B 2. Lost manuscript, once housed in the Eberbach Abbey in the Rheingau. Date: mid-12th century. Its contents can be reconstructed based on a transcript and an official edition, both of the 16th century:
    - B 2a. Clm 4029 (Münchener Staatsbibliothek), paper MS, a transcript written in the 16th century for the humanist Konrad Peutinger.
    - B 2b. Martin Frecht (ed.), Witichindi Saxonis rerum ab Henrico et Ottone I impp. gestarum libri III [...], the editio princeps published in Basel, 1532. Available for viewing online
- Recension C (also continues until 973)
  - MS C 1. MS no. 298, f. 81-244 (Monte Cassino monastery). Date: 11th century. Transcribed at Benevento, the Lombard duchy south of Rome.
  - MS C 2. MS Lat. oct. 198 (Berliner Staatsbibliothek), f. 1-39'. Date: 13th century. Donated to the library in 1909 and before that time unknown to scholarship.

== Content ==
The Res gestae Saxonicae consist of three books:

=== Book 1 ===
Widukind of Corvey starts the first book with the fall of the Germanic Thuringian dynasty. In his version, Amalaberga is the daughter of the Frankish king Huga. After Huga's death Thiadrich, his son by a concubine is crowned as king, but Amalaberga convinces her husband, Irminfrid, with the help of the warrior Iring, that it is really she who should inherit the kingdom. A war starts, and after the Franks under Thiadrich have won a battle at Runibergun, the Thuringi retreat into the fortress of Scithingi (modern Burgscheidungen).

The Franks get the help of the newly immigrated Saxons who are looking for land, and a bloody battle is fought at Scithingi. After many warriors have been slain, Irminfrid sends Iring as a messenger to Thiadrich to ask for peace. The kings reach an agreement and plan to slay the Saxons on the morrow, but the Saxons get word of this. At the behest of the veteran Hathagat, they storm Scithingi during the night and kill all adults. Only Irminfrid and his family escape. The Saxons celebrate their victory for three days, afterwards they return to Thiadrich, who gives the country over to them.

By the order of Thiadrich, Iring convinces Irminfrid to return to the Frankish court. When Irminfrid kneels in submission before Thiadrich, Iring slays him. Thiadrich banishes him, as he has become despicable to all men by this deed, and he wants to have no part of this crime. Iring announces that he will atone for his crime and get revenge for his former master and slays Thiadrich as well. He places the body of Irminfrid over that of Thiadrich, so he will be victor in death at least, and leaves.

Widukind ends by doubting the truth of this story, but recounts that the Milky Way is called "Iring's Street" to his day. An allusion to the conversion of the Saxons to Christianity under Charlemagne brings him to the early Saxon dukes and details of the reign of Henry the Fowler.

=== Book 2 ===
The second book opens with the election of Otto the Great as king of the Holy Roman Empire, treats of the risings against his authority, omitting events in Italy, and concludes with the death of his wife Edith in 946. He dedicates his writings to Matilda, daughter of Otto and abbess of Quedlinburg, a descendant of the Saxon leader Widukind, his own namesake.

=== Book 3 ===
The third book tells the story of Liudolf, Duke of Swabia and Otto's Franconian campaign.

== Style ==
Widukind's style reflects his familiarity with the De vita Caesarum of Suetonius, the Vita Karoli Magni of Einhard, and probably with Livy and Bede. Many quotations from the Vulgate are found in his writings, and there are traces of a knowledge of Virgil, Ovid and other Roman poets. The earlier part of his work is taken from tradition, but he wrote the contemporary part as one familiar with court life and the events of the day.

== Editions and translations ==
- Bachrach, Bernard S.; Bachrach, David S., eds. (2014). Widukind of Corvey: Deeds of the Saxons. Washington: The Catholic University of America Press. (English translation)
- Rotter, Ekkehart; Schneidmüller, Bernd, eds. (1981). Widukind von Corvey: Res gestae Saxonicae: Die Sachsengeschichte. Stuttgart: Reclam. (Edition and German translation)
- Bauer, Albert and Reinhold Rau (eds and trs.). "Die Sachsengeschichte des Widukind von Korvei." In Quellen zur Geschichte der sächsischen Kaiserzeit. Freiherr-vom-Stein-Gedächtnisausgabe 8. Darmstadt, 1971 (5th print: 2002). 1-183. Edition and German translation.
- Hirsch, Paul and H.-E. Lohmann (eds.), Die Sachsengeschichte des Widukind von Korvei. MGH Scriptores rerum Germanicarum in usum scholarum 60. Hanover, 1935. Available online from the Digital Monumenta Germaniae Historica
- Waitz, G. MGH Scriptores. Hanover and Berlin, 1826.
- Metelmann, Ernst (tr.). Chroniken des Mittelalters: Widukind, Otto von Freising, Helmold. Munich, 1964. German translation, with introduction by Anton Ritthaler.
- Wood, Raymond F. (tr.). "The three books of the deeds of the Saxons, by Widukind of Corvey, translated with introduction, notes, and bibliography." Dissertation. University of California, Los Angeles, 1949. English translation. Available online from ProQuest Dissertations and Theses (subscription required)
- Schottin, Reinhold (tr.) and Wilhelm Wattenbach (intro.). Widukinds Sächsische Geschichten. Die Geschichtschreiber der deutschen Vorzeit 33. Berlin, 1852. German translation.
- Walkowski, Grzegorz Kazimierz (tr.) Vvitichindus: Res gestae Saxonicae; Widukind: Dzieje Sasów. Bydgoszcz 2013. ISBN 978-83-930932-9-8. Translation into Polish.
- Санчук Г.Э. "Видукинд Корвейский. Деяния саксов." Moscow, Nauka, 1975. Russian translate.

== Secondary literature ==
- Althoff, Gerd. "Widukind von Corvey. Kronzeuge und Herausforderung." Frühmittelalterliche Studien 27 (1993): 253-72.
- Bagge, Sverre. Kings, Politics, and the Right Order of the World in German Historiography c. 950-1150. Studies in the History of Christian Traditions 103. Leiden et al.: Brill, 2002. Chapter 1.
- Beumann, Helmut. Widukind von Korvey. Untersuchungen zur Geschichtsschreibung und Ideengeschichte des 10. Jahrhunderts. Weimar, 1950. The classic study of Widukind and the Res gestae.
- Beumann, Helmut. "Historiographische Konzeption und politische Ziele Widukinds von Corvey." In: La storiografia altomedievale (1970). 857-94.
- Vester, Helmut. "Widukind von Korvei - ein Beispiel zur Wirkungsgeschichte Sallusts." Altsprachlicher Unterricht 21.1 (1978): 5-22.
- Hartke, Adrian. Die Res gestae Saxonicae von Widukind von Corvey: Sachsengeschichte und Fürstenspiegel. GRIN Verlag, 2005. ISBN 978-3-638-67456-0.
