= 488 (disambiguation) =

The number 488 may refer to any of several things:

- The year 488.
- The year 488 BC
- British Rail Class 488, unpowered electric multiple unit trailer sets, converted from Mark 2F coaches
- Ferrari 488, a mid-engined sports car
- IEEE-488, a short-range, digital communications bus specification
- 488 Kreusa, a minor planet orbiting the Sun
- Nevada State Route 488
- New York State Route 488
- No. 488 Squadron RNZAF
- Unterseeboot 488 (U-488), a Type XIV U-boat ("Milchkuh") of the Kriegsmarine
- USS McCalla (DD-488), a Gleaves-class destroyer
- USS Sarda (SS-488), a Tench-class submarine

== See also ==
- 488th (disambiguation)
