= 488th =

488th may refer to:

- 488th Bombardment Group, an inactive United States Air Force unit
- 488th Bombardment Squadron, an inactive United States Air Force unit

== See also ==
- 488 (number)
- 488 (disambiguation)
- 488, the year 488 (CDLXXXVIII) of the Julian calendar
- 488 BC
