= Raicunda =

Lombardic queen consort

Raicunda (? - 512), also known as Radikunda, Radegunda or Ranikunda was a Lombardic queen consort.

She was the daughter of the Thurinigian king Bisinus and his Lombard wife Menia. She had three brothers named in the sources, Hermanafrid, Bertachar and Baderic, who divided the Thuringian kingdom after the death of their father. Raicunda went with her mother to the kingdom of the Lombards. She married the Lombard king Wacho, but died in 512 AD with no children then living (it is unclear if she had any children who had died previously).

== Sources ==
- Michael Kirchschlager: Runibergun. Vom Königreich der Thüringer. Verlag Kirchschlager, Arnstadt 2009, ISBN 978-3-934277-27-4, S. 23
- Helmut Castritius, Dieter Geuenich, Matthias Werner (Hrsg.): Die Frühzeit der Thüringer. Archäologie, Sprache, Geschichte (= Reallexikon der Germanischen Altertumskunde. Ergänzungsband Nr. 63). Walter de Gruyter, Berlin/New York 2009, ISBN 978-3-11-021454-3.
