= Hadugato =

Pagan Saxon leader

Hadugato or Hathagat was an early Saxon leader, considered a founding father of Saxony by the tenth century. In 531, he led the Saxons to victory over the Thuringians at the battle of Burgscheidungen, "a legendary victory, and one so great that [Hadugato] appeared to [later] Saxons as an epiphany of divinity itself." The Chronica ducum de Brunswick records that in the Duchy of Brunswick in the sixteenth century a memorial week was still observed following Michaelmas (September 29) to celebrate the Saxon victory over the Thuringians.

== Battle of Burgscheidungen ==
The earliest source to mention Hadugato is the Translatio sancti Alexandri of Rudolf of Fulda. This was begun in 863 and completed after Rudolf's death in 865 by a monk named Meginhart. The account in the Translatio is repeated almost verbatim in the Deeds of the Bishops of the Church of Hamburg of Adam of Bremen, written between 1073 and 1076. According to this account, the Saxons arrived in the region of Hadeln (Haduloha), having sailed from Britain, during the war between Irminfrid, king of the Thuringians, and Theuderic I, king of the Franks. The latter, "his hope of conquering frustrated, sent messengers to the Saxons, whose leader [dux, duke] was Hadugato … promising them a place in which to settle in the event of victory." The Saxons fought "as if their own liberty and country were at stake", and Theuderic kept his promise.

The most extensive account of Hadugato is found in Widukind of Corvey's Deeds of the Saxons, completed around 967. Widukind's account also appears in a close paraphrase in the world chronicle of Frutolf of Michelsberg (died 1103). In this version, the Saxons, as allies of the Franks, defeat the Thuringians beneath the walls of Burgscheidungen on the Unstrut. Their leader is not named. After the battle, Irminfrid offers to make peace and join Theuderic in driving off his Saxon allies. When word of this reaches the Saxons, a council is held at which "a certain one of the veteran soldiers, already somewhat older, but still vigorous in advancing old age, who by merit of his great valor was called father of fathers [pater patrum], by name Hathagat", gives a speech after taking the "standard that was held sacred among them, marked with the likeness of a lion and a dragon, and an eagle swooping from above." According to Widukind, he urged the Saxons to attack the unsuspecting Thuringians, putting himself forward as their leader. In the night, they scaled the walls of Burgscheidungen, massacred the Thuringian men, raped their women and forced Irminfrid and his court to flee.

The pagan Saxons then set up an altar of victory and "celebrated the appropriate rites with all due solemnity, according to their ancestral superstition" for three days. They even "raised their leader [duke] to the skies with their praise, declaring him possessed of divine courage and god-like valor who by his constancy had led them to win such a victory." All this took place, Widukind says, "as the memory of our elders testifies, at the Kalends of October," i.e. on October 1.

== Possible pagan significance ==
The German historian Karl Hauck argues that the oral tradition of Hadugato that Widukind records contains a display of sacral kingship, with Hadugato being worshiped as a god. He qualifies the worship of such battlefield leaders as a "temporary" deification. He also sees pagan significance (an autumn festival) in the date.

Clive Tolley has argued that Widukind is in fact describing an ad hoc Irminsul (sacred pillar) rather than a true altar. He argues that Widukind's somewhat garbled passage indicates that the real name of the "altar" was Hirmin (which the Saxon historian glosses as Hermes) and its form was that of a pillar.

== Name ==
The name Hadugato (as in Adam of Bremen), Hadugoto (as in the Translatio), Hatugato (as in Frutolf) or Hathagat (as in Widukind) is preserved only in sources written centuries after his life. The form Hathugast that appears in some modern works is etymologically incorrect.

According to Hauck, the name is probably no more than an honorific, Hathugaut, meaning "Gaut of battle", in reference to Gaut, the legendary ancestor of the Geats and of the royal houses of the Goths and the Lombards. A similar name, Sigegéat, meaning "Gaut of victory", is preserved in Anglo-Saxon royal genealogies. The name "Gaut" itself would just be another by-name for Wodan (Odinsheiti).

Hauck treats Widukind's phrase pater patrum as a variation of pater patriae (father of the country). "The most noble house 'represents' the tribe" and Widukind clearly presents Hadugato as the most noble. In Hauck's view, Widukind is presenting Hadugato as the ancestor of the Liudolfings, the ruling house of Saxony in his own time, without presenting an actual genealogy.

Hauck's conclusions are not universally accepted, since the connection of the name Gaut to Wodan comes only from later Norse sagas. Without sources written hundreds of years after the earliest accounts of Hadugato, no divine meaning would be attached to the -gat(o) suffix in his name. Without the later sources, these names would have remained "empty and unnoticed" in Eve Picard's words.

Royal titles
Preceded by Unknown	Duke of Saxony fl. 531	Succeeded by Unknown, eventually Berthoald
