= Burgscheidungen =

- Stadtteil of Laucha an der Unstrut
- Interactive map of Burgscheidungen
- Location within Germany Location within Saxony-Anhalt
- Coordinates: 51°15′N 11°39′E
- Country: Germany
- State: Saxony-Anhalt
- District: Burgenlandkreis
- Town: Laucha an der Unstrut

Area
  - Total: 8.36 km^{2} (3.23 sq mi)
- Elevation: 130 m (430 ft)

Population (2006-12-31)
  - Total: 592
  - Density: 70.8/km^{2} (183/sq mi)
- Time zone: UTC+01:00 (CET)
  - Summer (DST): UTC+02:00 (CEST)
- Postal codes: 06636
- Dialling codes: 034462

Burgscheidungen is a village and a former municipality in the Burgenlandkreis district, in Saxony-Anhalt, Germany. Since 1 July 2009, it is part of the town Laucha an der Unstrut.

Burgscheidungen was the site of the Saxon Hadugato's defeat of the Thuringians under King Irminfrid in 531. This defeat spelled the end of an independent Thuringian kingdom. It is variously attributed to the Franks under King Theuderic I or to their allies, the Saxons under Duke Hathagat. It was one of the founding myths of the Saxons by the ninth century.
