= Amalaberga =

Amalaberga (fl. 531), was a queen consort of Thüringhia. She was the daughter of Amalafrida, daughter of Theodemir, king of the Ostrogoths.

Her father is unknown, her uncle was Theodoric the Great. Around 510, she was married to Hermanfrid, son of the Thuringian ruler Bisinus and his Lombard wife Menia. Hermanfrid and his brothers Baderic and Bertachar succeeded their father as co-rulers, while their mother returned to her people, where their sister, Raicunda, married Wacho, king of the Lombards. Hermanfrid and Amalaberga had two children: a son named Amalafrid and a daughter Rodelinda.

Amalaberga is said to have encouraged Hermanfrid to make war on his brothers and become sole ruler. Bertachar was killed in battle, possibly as early as 525. Hermanfrid then sought the help of Theuderic I, the Merovingian king of Austrasia, to attack Baderic and seize control of all of Thuringia. After Baderic was defeated and beheaded by the Franks, Hermanfrid reneged on certain promised land concessions. Theuderic then persuaded his brother, Chlothar I, Merovingian king at Soissons, to join him in attacking Hermanfrid. Clothar had married Baderic's daughter, Ingund, and later, his daughter, Aregund.

According to the Decem Libri of Gregory of Tours, in 531, Hermanfrid was defeated at the battle of Unstrut and Thuringia was annexed to the Frankish empire. Hermanfrid traveled under safe conduct to meet with Theuderic at Zülpich. While walking along the city walls with Theuderic, Hermanfrid was thrown from the ramparts to his death.

According to Procopius (History of the Wars V, 13), after Hermanfrid's death, Amalaberga fled with her children to her brother Theodahad who was at that time (534-36) King of the Ostrogoths. During the Gothic War (535–554), they were captured by the Byzantine general Belisarius and sent to Constantinople. Justinian made Amalafrid a general and married off his sister Rodelinda to the Lombard king Audoin.
