= Battle of the Unstrut =

Battle of the Unstrut may refer to:

- Battle of the Unstrut River (531)
- Battle of Riade, fought along the Unstrut in 933
