= Menia =

Queen of the Thuringians

Menia (fl. c. 500) was the queen of the Thuringians by marriage and the earliest named ancestor of the Gausian dynasty of the Lombards. She became a legendary figure after her death, strongly associated with gold and wealth.

Only one other person is known by the name Menia, from a 9th-century polyptych of the Abbey of Saint-Remi. In origin it is probably a Germanic name, signifying collar, ring or necklace, and by extension treasure.

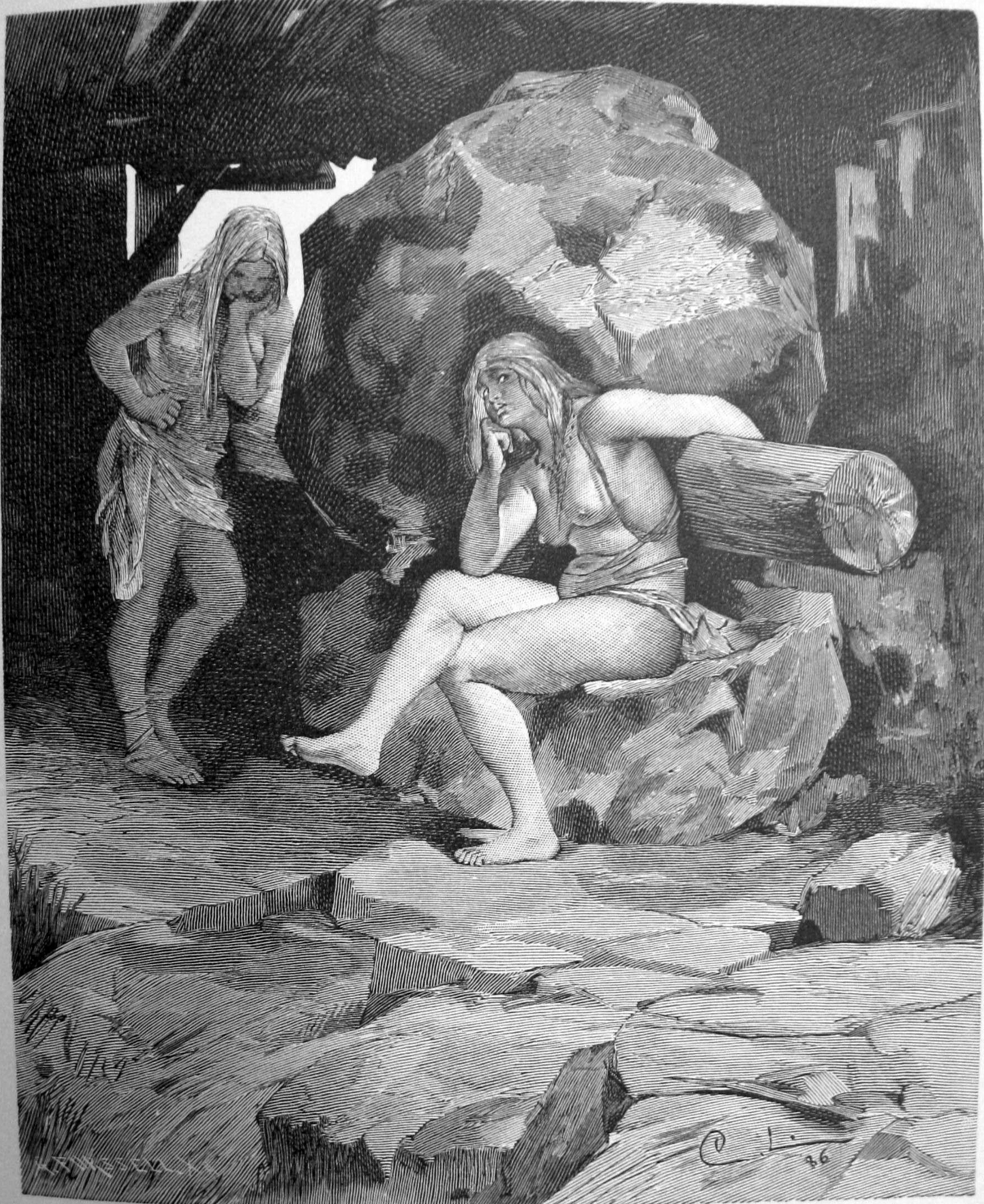
Menja and Fenja, from the legendary Icelandic Grottasöngr

Menia's marriage is recorded only in the Historia Langobardorum codicis Gothani. According to that source, she was the wife of King Pissa, usually identified as Bisinus, king of the Thuringians. The same source and the other Lombard chronicles make Bisinus the father of Raicunda, first wife of Wacho, king of the Lombards. She may have been the daughter of Menia. Frankish sources, such as Venantius Fortunatus, make Bisinus the father of the three brothers who ruled Thuringia in the 520s: Hermanafrid, Bertachar (father of Saint Radegund) and Baderic. They are sometimes considered as sons of Menia, or else as sons of Basina, who is called a wife of Bisinus by the Frankish historian Gregory of Tours. Many scholars, however, reject Bisinus' marriage to Basina as ahistorical, leaving Menia as his only known wife.

By a relationship with an unnamed man of the Gausian family—a Gausus, perhaps a Geat, according to the Historia Langobardorum—she was the mother of Audoin, king of the Lombards from 546. She also had a daughter from whom the later dukes of Friuli were descended. Audoin was in turn the father of Alboin, who led the Lombards into Italy.

As an ancestor of Lombard royalty, Menia seems to have entered the oral tradition and from there various Germanic epic traditions, such as the Icelandic Poetic Edda. She is a gold-grinding giantess in Grottasöngr and in Sigurðarkviða hin skamma her name is part of a kenning (Meni góð, "Menia's goods") meaning gold. She is also featured in the Byzantine tradition. In the Greek Life of Saint Pankratios of Taormina, she is the wife of the Lombard Rhemaldos who kills the mother of Tauros and then marries him. She learns alchemy and turns base metals into gold. The entire legend is used to explain how the city of Taormina (Tauromenia) got its name.
