= 531 =

Calendar year

531 in various calendars
- Gregorian calendar: 531; DXXXI
- Ab urbe condita: 1284
- Assyrian calendar: 5281
- Balinese saka calendar: 452–453
- Bengali calendar: −63 – −62
- Berber calendar: 1481
- Buddhist calendar: 1075
- Burmese calendar: −107
- Byzantine calendar: 6039–6040
- Chinese calendar: 庚戌年 (Metal Dog); 3228 or 3021 — to — 辛亥年 (Metal Pig); 3229 or 3022
- Coptic calendar: 247–248
- Discordian calendar: 1697
- Ethiopian calendar: 523–524
- Hebrew calendar: 4291–4292
- Hindu calendars
- Vikram Samvat: 587–588
- Shaka Samvat: 452–453
- Kali Yuga: 3631–3632
- Holocene calendar: 10531
- Iranian calendar: 91 BP – 90 BP
- Islamic calendar: 94 BH – 93 BH
- Javanese calendar: 418–419
- Julian calendar: 531; DXXXI
- Korean calendar: 2864
- Minguo calendar: 1381 before ROC 民前1381年
- Nanakshahi calendar: −937
- Seleucid era: 842/843 AG
- Thai solar calendar: 1073–1074
- Tibetan calendar: ལྕགས་ཕོ་ཁྱི་ལོ་ (male Iron-Dog); 657 or 276 or −496 — to — ལྕགས་མོ་ཕག་ལོ་ (female Iron-Boar); 658 or 277 or −495

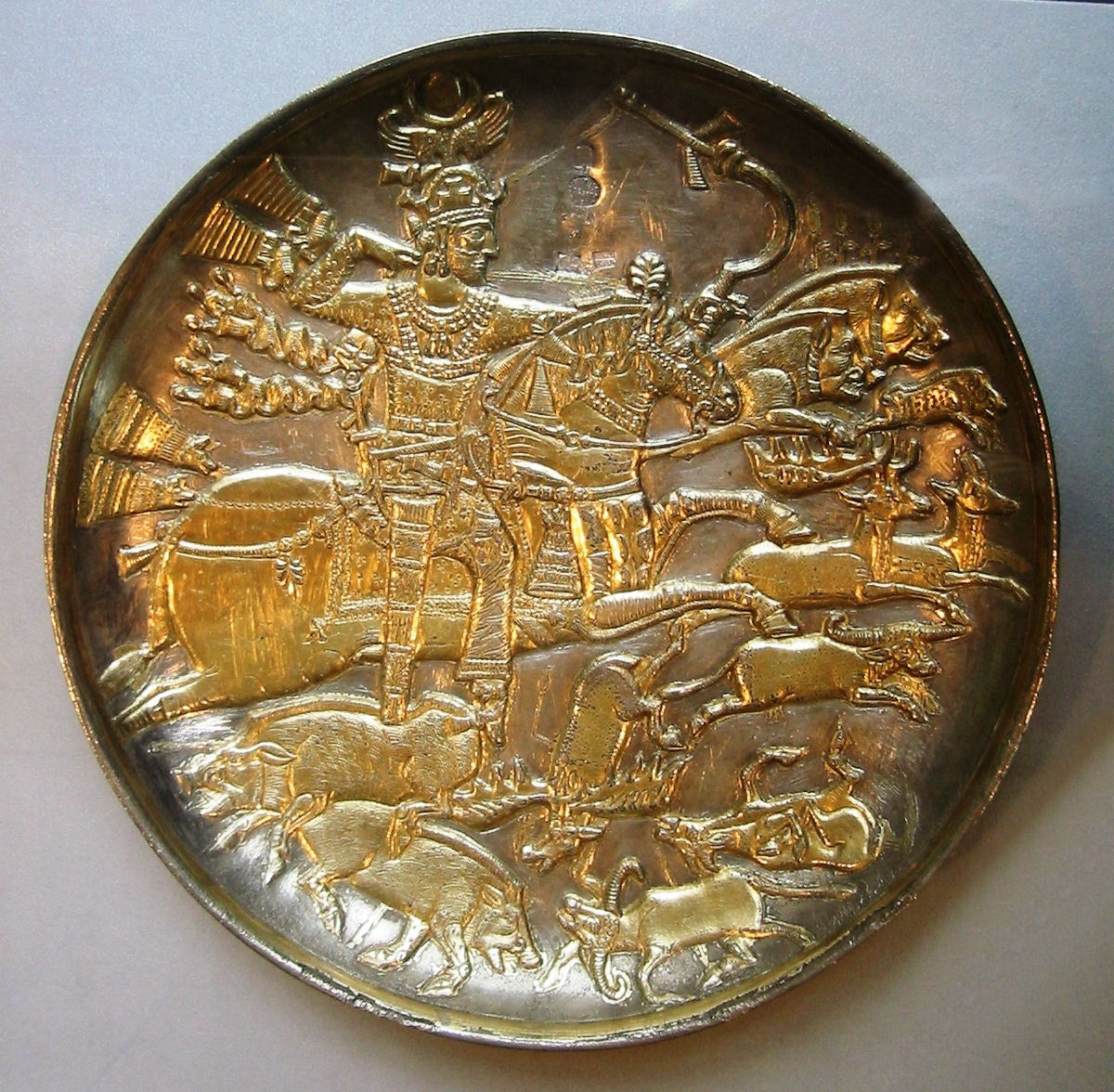
King Khosrau I (531–579)

Year 531 (DXXXI) was a common year starting on Wednesday of the Julian calendar. At the time, it was known in the Roman Empire as the Year after the Consulship of Lampadius and Probus (or, less frequently, year 1284 Ab urbe condita). The denomination 531 for this year has been used since the early medieval period, when the Anno Domini calendar era became the prevalent method in Europe for naming years.

== Events ==
=== By place ===
==== Byzantine Empire ====
- April 19 – Battle of Callinicum: A Byzantine army (20,000 men), commanded by Belisarius, is defeated by the Persians at Raqqa (northern Syria). Emperor Justinian I negotiates an end to the hostilities, and Belisarius is hailed as a hero.
- Some members of the Blue and Green chariot racing factions in Constantinople are imprisoned for murder, precipitating the Nika riots the next year.

==== Europe ====
- The Franks under King Chlothar I march against the Thuringi with Chlothar's nephew Theudebert I. The Kingdom of Thuringia comes under Frankish domination.
- Hermanafrid, last king of the Thuringi, is defeated by the Franks near the Unstrut River. During negotiations he is pushed from the town walls of Zülpich (northern Germany).
- King Childebert I receives pleas from his sister Clotilde, wife of King Amalaric, claiming that she is abused by her husband. Childebert invades Septimania (Gaul).
- Childebert I defeats the Visigoths and conquers the capital Narbonne. Amalaric flees south to Barcelona, where he is assassinated by his own men.
- Clotilde returns with the Frankish army and dies on the journey home. She is buried in Paris alongside her father Clovis I.
- Theudis, sword-bearer of former king Theodoric the Great, succeeds Amalaric as new ruler of the Visigoths.

==== Persia ====
- King Kavad I, age 82, dies after a 43-year reign. Khosrau I, his favourite son, is proclaimed successor over his elder brothers.

==== Asia ====
- The reign of Chang Guang Wang, ruler of Northern Wei, ends. Gao Huan, Chinese general, begins a rebellion and declares another member of the imperial clan, An Ding Wang, emperor.
- Ankan, age 66, succeeds his father Keitai as the 27th emperor of Japan.
- Anwon becomes ruler of the Korean kingdom of Goguryeo.

==== Unidentified ====
- Major volcanic eruption.

== Births ==
- Li Delin, Chinese official and writer (d. 591)
- Liu Jingyan, Chinese Empress (d. 615)
- Waldrada, Lombard princess (d. 572)
- Yan Zhitui, Chinese scholar and official (d. 591)

== Deaths ==
- May 30 – Xiao Tong, prince of the Liang Dynasty (b. 501)
- Amalaric, king of the Visigoths (assassinated)
- Clotilde, Visigoth queen and daughter of Clovis I
- Drest IV, king of the Picts (approximate date)
- Hermanafrid, king of the Thuringi (murdered)
- Kavadh I, king of the Persian Empire (b. 449)
- Keitai, emperor of Japan (b. 450)
- Maine mac Cearbhall, king of Uí Maine (or 537)
- Xiao Zhuang Di, emperor of Northern Wei (b. 507)
