= 556 =

Calendar year

556 in various calendars
- Gregorian calendar: 556; DLVI
- Ab urbe condita: 1309
- Armenian calendar: 5 ԹՎ Ե
- Assyrian calendar: 5306
- Balinese saka calendar: 477–478
- Bengali calendar: −38 – −37
- Berber calendar: 1506
- Buddhist calendar: 1100
- Burmese calendar: −82
- Byzantine calendar: 6064–6065
- Chinese calendar: 乙亥年 (Wood Pig); 3253 or 3046 — to — 丙子年 (Fire Rat); 3254 or 3047
- Coptic calendar: 272–273
- Discordian calendar: 1722
- Ethiopian calendar: 548–549
- Hebrew calendar: 4316–4317
- Hindu calendars
- Vikram Samvat: 612–613
- Shaka Samvat: 477–478
- Kali Yuga: 3656–3657
- Holocene calendar: 10556
- Iranian calendar: 66 BP – 65 BP
- Islamic calendar: 68 BH – 67 BH
- Javanese calendar: 444–445
- Julian calendar: 556; DLVI
- Korean calendar: 2889
- Minguo calendar: 1356 before ROC 民前1356年
- Nanakshahi calendar: −912
- Seleucid era: 867/868 AG
- Thai solar calendar: 1098–1099
- Tibetan calendar: ཤིང་མོ་ཕག་ལོ་ (female Wood-Boar); 682 or 301 or −471 — to — མེ་ཕོ་བྱི་བ་ལོ་ (male Fire-Rat); 683 or 302 or −470

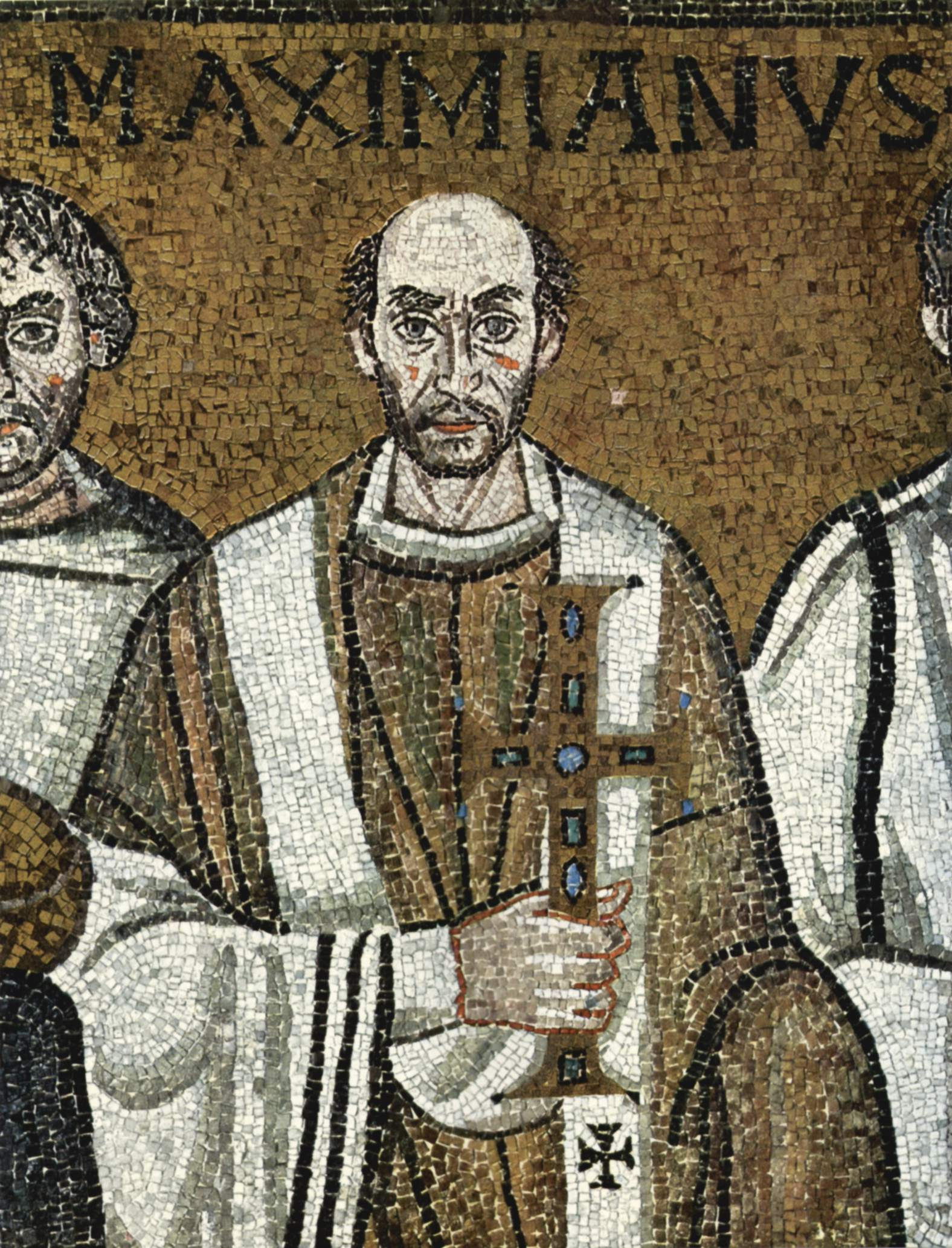
Maximianus of Ravenna (499–556)

Year 556 (DLVI) was a leap year starting on Saturday of the Julian calendar. The denomination 556 for this year has been used since the early medieval period, when the Anno Domini calendar era became the prevalent method in Europe for naming years.

== Events ==
=== By place ===
==== Europe ====
- King Chlothar I suppresses a revolt of the Saxons and Thuringi in Saxony (Germany). For some time he exacts a tribute of 500 cows every year.

==== Britain ====
- King Cynric and his son Ceawlin of Wessex fight against the Britons at Beranburh, now identified as Barbury Castle (Wiltshire) in South West England.

==== Persia ====
- Lazic War: A Byzantine expeditionary force under Justin retakes Archaeopolis (modern Georgia), and routs the Persian army.
- Siege of Phasis: The Persians are defeated at the besieged town of Phasis in Lazica, held by the Byzantines.
- King Khosrau I opens negotiations with Justinian I, leading to the establishment of a 50 year peace agreement in 562.

=== By topic ===
==== Religion ====
- April 16 – The diplomatic representative (apocrisiarius) to Constantinople is elected as Pope Pelagius I, succeeding Vigilius as the 60th pope of Rome.

== Births ==
- Gao Bainian, crown prince of Northern Qi (d. 564)
- Amr Ibn Hashim, Arab pagan chieftain, and biggest enemy to the spread of early Islam

== Deaths ==
- February 22 – Maximianus, Bishop of Ravenna (b. 499)
- Echu Tirmcharna, king of Connacht (Ireland)
- Erzhu Ying'e, empress of Northern Wei
- Romanos the Melodist, Syrian poet (approximate date)
- Xiao Yuanming, emperor of the Liang Dynasty
- Yuwen Tai, general of Western Wei (b. 507)

== Sources ==
- Bury, John Bagnell (2011) [1958]. History of the Later Roman Empire: From the Death of Theodosius I to the Death of Justinian, Volume 2. Mineola, New York: Dover Publications. ISBN 0-486-20399-9.
- Greatrex, Geoffrey; Lieu, Samuel N. C. (2002). The Roman Eastern Frontier and the Persian Wars (Part II, 363–630 AD). London, United Kingdom: Routledge. ISBN 0-415-14687-9.
- Martindale, John R., ed. (1992). The Prosopography of the Later Roman Empire: Volume III, AD 527–641. Cambridge: Cambridge University Press. ISBN 0-521-20160-8.
