= Battle of the Unstrut River (531) =

Military engagement near Unstrut, Germany

Date	c. 531 CE
Location	near Unstrut, Germany
Result	Decisive Frankish victory Fall of the Thuringian kingdom

Belligerents
Frankish Kingdom	Thuringi

Commanders and leaders
Theuderic I Chlothar I	Hermanfrid †

Strength
Unknown	Unknown

Casualties and losses
Unknown	Unknown

The Battle of the Unstrut River is said to have been fought in 531 CE near the river Unstrut when the king of Francia, Theuderic I decisively defeated the Thuringian army led by their king Hermanfrid. Thuringia was subjugated in 530 CE, soon after the battle. The battle was so decisive that it is said that the Franks were able cross the river by walking over the corpses of their foes. After the battle, Chlothar took Radegund as a wife as part of his war booty.
