= 591 =

Calendar year

591 in various calendars
- Gregorian calendar: 591; DXCI
- Ab urbe condita: 1344
- Armenian calendar: 40; ԹՎ Խ
- Assyrian calendar: 5341
- Balinese saka calendar: 512–513
- Bengali calendar: −3 – −2
- Berber calendar: 1541
- Buddhist calendar: 1135
- Burmese calendar: −47
- Byzantine calendar: 6099–6100
- Chinese calendar: 庚戌年 (Metal Dog); 3288 or 3081 — to — 辛亥年 (Metal Pig); 3289 or 3082
- Coptic calendar: 307–308
- Discordian calendar: 1757
- Ethiopian calendar: 583–584
- Hebrew calendar: 4351–4352
- Hindu calendars
- Vikram Samvat: 647–648
- Shaka Samvat: 512–513
- Kali Yuga: 3691–3692
- Holocene calendar: 10591
- Iranian calendar: 31 BP – 30 BP
- Islamic calendar: 32 BH – 31 BH
- Javanese calendar: 480–481
- Julian calendar: 591; DXCI
- Korean calendar: 2924
- Minguo calendar: 1321 before ROC 民前1321年
- Nanakshahi calendar: −877
- Seleucid era: 902/903 AG
- Thai solar calendar: 1133–1134
- Tibetan calendar: ལྕགས་ཕོ་ཁྱི་ལོ་ (male Iron-Dog); 717 or 336 or −436 — to — ལྕགས་མོ་ཕག་ལོ་ (female Iron-Boar); 718 or 337 or −435

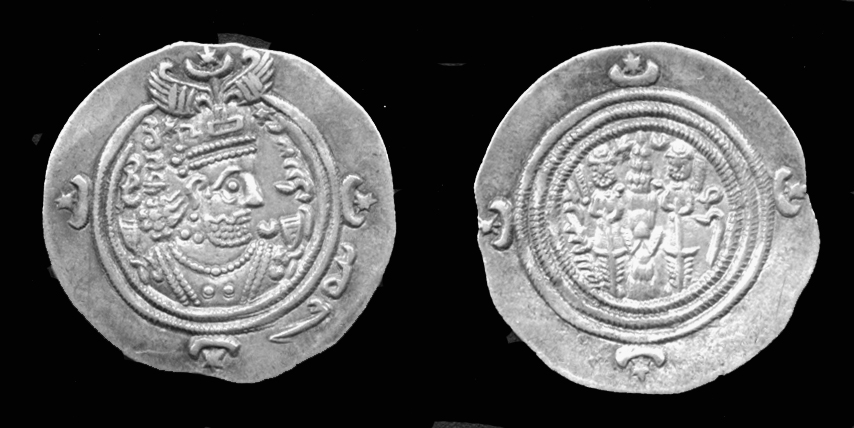
King Khosrau II of Persia (590–628)

Year 591 (DXCI) was a common year starting on Monday of the Julian calendar. The denomination 591 for this year has been used since the early medieval period, when the Anno Domini calendar era became the prevalent method in Europe for naming years.

== Events ==
=== By place ===
==== Byzantine Empire ====
- Byzantine–Sassanid War: Emperor Maurice, seeing an opportunity to end the prolonged war to the advantage of Constantinople, assists Khosrau II to regain the Persian throne. He sends a Byzantine army (35,000 men) under Narses into Mesopotamia, through Syria. At the same time, an expeditionary force in Armenia advances through Caucasian Iberia into Media (modern Azerbaijan).
- Battle of Blarathon: A Persian army of about 40,000 men under King Bahrām VI is defeated, in the lowlands near Ganzak (northwestern Iran), by the Byzantines. Bahrām flees to seek refuge with the Turks in Central Asia, and settles in Fergana. However, after some time, he is murdered by a hired assassin of Khosrau II.
- Summer – Maurice begins a series of military expeditions, to defend the Balkan provinces from the Avars and Slavs. He establishes the Danube frontier (Limes Moesiae) from the Delta to the fortress city of Singidunum (Belgrade), and permits the Byzantines to reassert their authority in the interior.

==== Europe ====
- Agilulf, cousin of Authari (called "the Thuringian"), is raised on the shield (a ceremonial investment) by Lombard warriors in Milan. He becomes king of the Lombards, on advice of the Lombard dukes (dux). Agilulf marries widowed queen Theodelinda and is baptized to please her.
- Arechis I succeeds his uncle Zotto as the second Duke of Benevento.
- A locust swarm destroys the harvest in Northern Italy (approximate date).

==== Persia ====
- Khosrau II is reinstalled as king of the Persian Empire. Peace with Constantinople is concluded after a war of almost 20 years. Maurice receives the Persian provinces of Armenia and Georgia. The recognition of the traditional frontiers, and the cessation of subsidies for the Caucasus forts, leaves the Byzantines in a dominant position in their relations with Persia.

==== Asia ====
- The first city wall of Hangzhou (Eastern China) is constructed.

==== Mesoamerica ====
- May 21 – A Mesoamerican ballgame court is dedicated at the Mayan city of Chinkultic (Mexico).

=== By topic ===
==== Religion ====
- Pope Gregory I criticizes the bishops of Arles and Marseille for allowing the forced baptism of Jews in Provence (France).
- Jnanagupta, Afghan Buddhist monk, translates the Vimalakirti Sutra into Chinese.

== Births ==
- Cadwallon ap Cadfan, king of Gwynedd (approximate date)
- Gundeberga, queen of the Lombards
- Li Xiaogong, prince of the Tang dynasty (d. 640)
- Su Dingfang, general of the Tang dynasty (d. 667)

== Deaths ==
- Aredius, abbot and saint
- Faroald I, duke of Spoleto (or 592)
- Garibald I, duke of Bavaria (b. 540)
- Golindouch, Persian saint
- John Mystacon, Byzantine general (approximate date)
- Peter III of Raqqa, Patriarch of Antioch
- Li Delin, Chinese official and writer (b. 531)
- Yan Zhitui, Chinese scholar and official (b. 531)
- Zotto, founder of the Duchy of Benevento
