= 564 =

Calendar year

564 in various calendars
| Gregorian calendar | 564; DLXIV |
| Ab urbe condita | 1317 |
| Armenian calendar | 13; ԹՎ ԺԳ |
| Assyrian calendar | 5314 |
| Balinese saka calendar | 485–486 |
| Bengali calendar | −30 – −29 |
| Berber calendar | 1514 |
| Buddhist calendar | 1108 |
| Burmese calendar | −74 |
| Byzantine calendar | 6072–6073 |
| Chinese calendar | 癸未年 (Water Goat); 3261 or 3054 — to — 甲申年 (Wood Monkey); 3262 or 3055 |
| Coptic calendar | 280–281 |
| Discordian calendar | 1730 |
| Ethiopian calendar | 556–557 |
| Hebrew calendar | 4324–4325 |
- Hindu calendars
| Vikram Samvat | 620–621 |
| Shaka Samvat | 485–486 |
| Kali Yuga | 3664–3665 |
| Holocene calendar | 10564 |
| Iranian calendar | 58 BP – 57 BP |
| Islamic calendar | 60 BH – 59 BH |
| Javanese calendar | 452–453 |
| Julian calendar | 564; DLXIV |
| Korean calendar | 2897 |
| Minguo calendar | 1348 before ROC 民前1348年 |
| Nanakshahi calendar | −904 |
| Seleucid era | 875/876 AG |
| Thai solar calendar | 1106–1107 |
| Tibetan calendar | ཆུ་མོ་ལུག་ལོ་ (female Water-Sheep); 690 or 309 or −463 — to — ཤིང་ཕོ་སྤྲེ་ལོ་ (male Wood-Monkey); 691 or 310 or −462 |

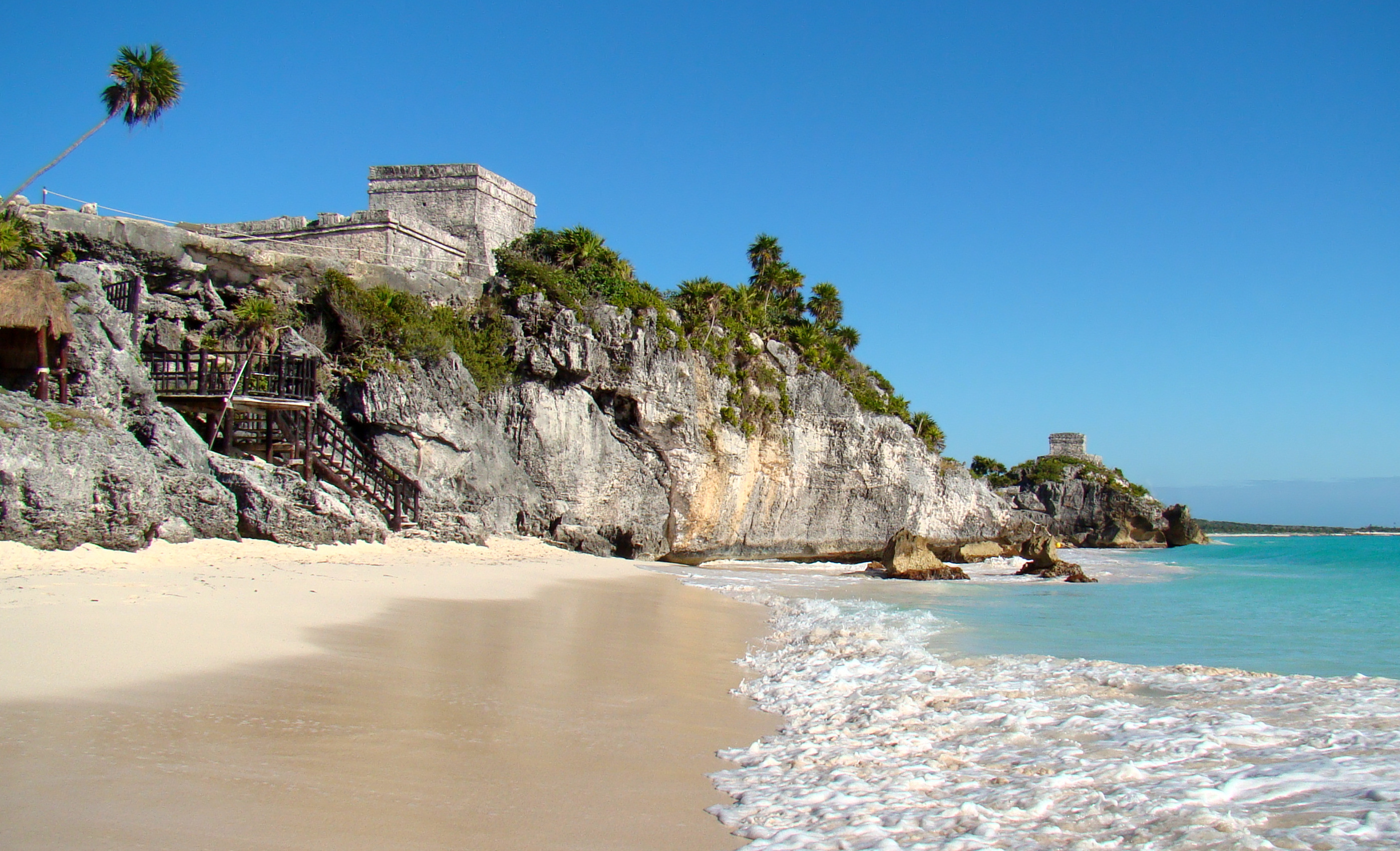
Seaside view of the Pyramid El Castillo (Tulum)

Year 564 (DLXIV) was a leap year starting on Tuesday of the Julian calendar. The denomination 564 for this year has been used since the early medieval period, when the Anno Domini calendar era became the prevalent method in Europe for naming years.

== Events ==
=== By place ===
==== Britain ====
- Cadoc, abbot of Llancarfan (Wales), settles in Weedon and is made bishop (approximate date).
- August 22 – Columba reports seeing the Loch Ness Monster at the River Ness (according to the "Life of St. Columba").

==== Mesoamerica ====
- Tulum, Maya walled city, on the Yucatán Peninsula (modern Mexico) is first mentioned on a stele inscription.

=== By topic ===
==== Religion ====
- Samson of Dol, one of seven founder saints of Brittany, attends a council in Paris and witnesses several royal decrees (approximate date).

== Births ==
- Hermenegild, Visigoth prince (approximate date)
- Li Baiyao, Chinese official and historian (d. 647)

== Deaths ==
- Gao Bainian, crown prince of Northern Qi (b. 556)
- Laisrén mac Nad Froích, Irish monk and saint
- Petroc, Celtic prince and saint (approximate date)
- Tudwal, Breton monk and saint (approximate date)
