= 551 =

Calendar year

551 in various calendars
- Gregorian calendar: 551; DLI
- Ab urbe condita: 1304
- Assyrian calendar: 5301
- Balinese saka calendar: 472–473
- Bengali calendar: −43 – −42
- Berber calendar: 1501
- Buddhist calendar: 1095
- Burmese calendar: −87
- Byzantine calendar: 6059–6060
- Chinese calendar: 庚午年 (Metal Horse); 3248 or 3041 — to — 辛未年 (Metal Goat); 3249 or 3042
- Coptic calendar: 267–268
- Discordian calendar: 1717
- Ethiopian calendar: 543–544
- Hebrew calendar: 4311–4312
- Hindu calendars
- Vikram Samvat: 607–608
- Shaka Samvat: 472–473
- Kali Yuga: 3651–3652
- Holocene calendar: 10551
- Iranian calendar: 71 BP – 70 BP
- Islamic calendar: 73 BH – 72 BH
- Javanese calendar: 439–440
- Julian calendar: 551; DLI
- Korean calendar: 2884
- Minguo calendar: 1361 before ROC 民前1361年
- Nanakshahi calendar: −917
- Seleucid era: 862/863 AG
- Thai solar calendar: 1093–1094
- Tibetan calendar: ལྕགས་ཕོ་རྟ་ལོ་ (male Iron-Horse); 677 or 296 or −476 — to — ལྕགས་མོ་ལུག་ལོ་ (female Iron-Sheep); 678 or 297 or −475

Year 551 (DLI) was a common year starting on Sunday of the Julian calendar. The denomination 551 for this year has been used since the early medieval period, when the Anno Domini calendar era became the prevalent method in Europe for naming years.

== Events ==
=== By place ===
==== Byzantine Empire ====
- After the death of his cousin Germanus, Justinian I appoints Narses new supreme commander, and returns to Italy. In Salona on the Adriatic coast, he assembles a Byzantine expeditionary force totaling 20,000 or possibly 30,000 men and a contingent of foreign allies, notably Lombards, Heruls and Bulgars.
- Gothic War: Narses arrives in Venetia and discovers that a powerful Gothic-Frank army (50,000 men), under joint command of the kings Totila and Theudebald, has blocked the principal route to the Po Valley. Not wishing to engage such a formidable force and confident that the Franks would avoid a direct confrontation, Narses skirts the lagoons along the Adriatic shore, by using vessels to leapfrog his army from point to point along the coast. In this way he arrives at the capital Ravenna without encountering any opposition. He attacks and crushes a small Gothic force at Ariminum (modern Rimini).
- Spring – The 551 Malian Gulf earthquake takes place in the vicinity of the Malian Gulf; it affects the cities of Echinus and Tarphe.
- July 9 – Beirut is destroyed by an earthquake and tsunami. Its epicenter has an estimated magnitude of about 7.2 or 7.6, and according to reports of Antoninus of Piacenza, Christian pilgrim, some 30,000 people are killed.
- Autumn – Battle of Sena Gallica: The Byzantine fleet (50 warships) destroys the Gothic naval force under Indulf near Sena Gallica (Senigallia), some 17 miles (27 km) north of Ancona. It marks the end of the Gothic supremacy in the Mediterranean Sea.

==== Europe ====
- Athanagild revolts against the Visigothic king Agila. Their armies meet at Seville (Andalusia), and Agila is defeated.
- 12,000 Kutrigurs appear in Europe led by Chinialus and others to assist the Gepids.

==== Persia ====
- Spring – Lazic War - Siege of Petra (550–551): The Byzantine army and their Sabir allies (some 6,000 men) under Bessas recapture the strategic Byzantine fortress of Petra, located on the coast of the Black Sea. He orders the city walls razed to the ground.

==== Asia ====
- Autumn – Xiao Dong, great-nephew of the rebellious general Hou Jing, succeeds Jianwen Di as emperor of the Liang Dynasty. Xiao Dong has no real power and Hou Jing controls the imperial government at the capital Jiankang.
- Bumin Qaghan, chieftain of the Göktürks, founds the Turkic Khaganate. He unites the local Turkic tribes and throws off the yoke of Rouran domination.

=== By topic ===
==== Arts and sciences ====
- Jordanes, Roman bureaucrat, publishes "The Origin and Deeds of the Goths" (approximate date).

== Births ==
- Ashina, empress of Northern Zhou (d. 582)
- Babai the Great, church father and theologian (approximate date)
- Germanus, Byzantine pretender (approximate date)
- Umako Soga, leader of the Soga clan (d. 626)

== Deaths ==
- Jianwen Di, emperor of the Liang Dynasty (b. 503)
- Wen Di, emperor of Western Wei (b. 507)
- Xiao Daqi, crown prince of Northern Qi (b. 524)

== Sources ==
- Antonopoulos, J. (1980), Data from investigation of seismic Sea waves events in the Eastern Mediterranean from 500 to 1000 A.D., Annals of Geophysics
