= Widukind of Corvey =

Saxon chronicler (c. 925 – after 973)

Widukind of Corvey (c. 920–925 – after 973) was a medieval Saxon chronicler and a monk of monastery of Corvey in Germany during the middle third of the 10th century. His three-volume Res gestae Saxonicae sive annalium libri tres is an important chronicle of 10th-century Germany during the rule of the Ottonian dynasty.

== Life ==
Widukind's date of birth is traditionally dated to around 920–925. Almost everything known about him derives from his own work, the Res gestae Saxonicae ('Deeds of the Saxons'). The only contemporary external reference is a list of monks who entered Corvey during the abbacy of Folcmar (917–942), where Widukind appears as the second-to-last among fifty entrants. Some scholars argue instead that Widukind was entered into the Corvey register as "a boy of six to eight years", and consequently date his birth to around 933–935.

Widukind's family background and precise origins remain unknown, but the prominence of Corvey and its close ties to the king suggest that admission to the monastery required a background of some importance. It is therefore likely that he came from a household whose support would have been advantageous to both Corvey and the crown. His sustained interest in Saxony and Saxon history also makes it highly probable that his family was Saxon. Claims that he was connected to the royal court or belonged to the household of Princess Mathilda, herself a descendant of Duke Widukind of Saxony (died after 785), remain a matter of scholarly debate.

Widukind entered the monastic community of Corvey about 940, where he began his literary career as a writer of saints' lives. Sigebert's assertion that Widukind also composed a life of Otto I rests on a misunderstanding. At an uncertain and disputed date, he later composed his principal work, the Deeds of the Saxons. Widukind likely began his historical work at the behest of Queen Matilda of Ringelheim, mother of Emperor Otto I. Archbishop William of Mainz, a son of the emperor, has also been proposed as a possible patron. Both Mathilda and William died in March 968, which led Widukind to dedicate his work to Abbess Mathilde of Quedlinburg, born in 955, a granddaughter of the queen and a daughter of Otto I.

No information survive regarding the date of his death, except that he was still alive after completing his history, which ends at the time of Otto I's death in May 973.

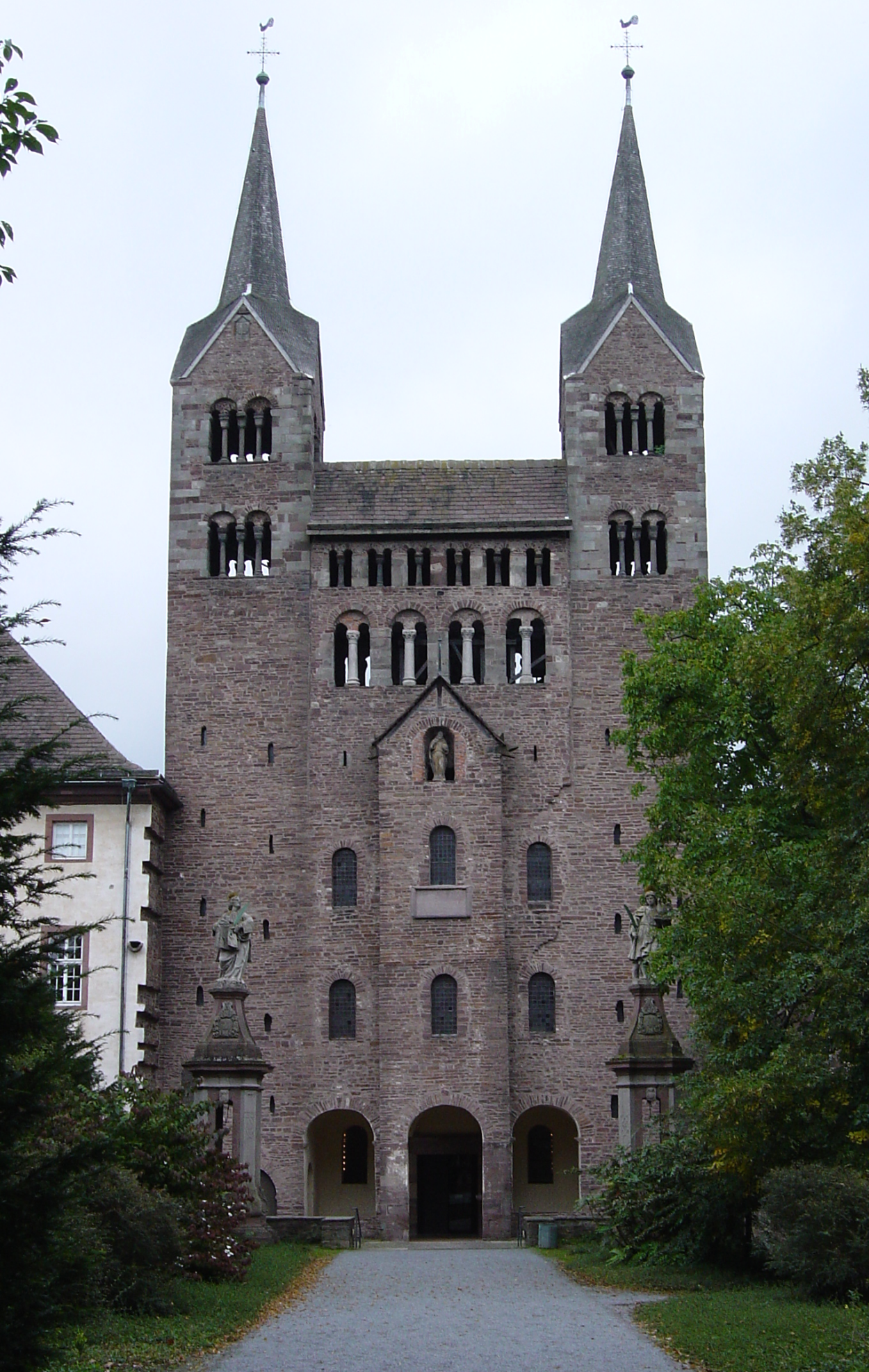
Corvey Abbey Church, westwork

== Work ==
The Res gestae Saxonicae are significant historical accounts of the times of Otto the Great and Henry the Fowler, modelled on the works of the Roman historian Sallust and the deuterocanonical Books of the Maccabees. Widukind wrote as a Saxon, proud of his people and history, beginning his narration not with the Roman Empire but with a brief synopsis derived from the orally-transmitted history of the Saxons and their struggles with the Franks, with a terseness that makes his work difficult to interpret.

Otto's rise as undisputed ruler of a German kingdom against the reluctant dukes made great impression on the Benedictine monk. By his own admission, Widukind first wrote several Christian hagiographies before he began his Res gestae Saxonicae. He dedicated the chronicles to Abbess Matilda of Quedlinburg (c. 955–999), daughter of Emperor Otto the Great. The annals were written after Otto's coronation by Pope John XII on 2 February 962; however, though both Otto and his father Henry the Fowler are named Imperatores, this incident is not mentioned. After the elevation of Matilda's brother Otto II as co-emperor in 967 and the death of her half-brother Archbishop William of Mainz one year later, the abbess remained the only important member of the Ottonian dynasty in the Saxon lands under regent Hermann Billung; therefore, Widukind may have begun the writing – or started all over again – to create a kind of mirror for princes.

Widukind of Corvey starts with the wars between Theuderich I, King of Austrasia, and the Thuringii, in which the Saxons played a large part. An allusion to the conversion of the Saxons to Christianity under Charlemagne brings him to the early Saxon dukes and details of the reign of Henry the Fowler, whose campaigns are referred to in some detail. He omitted Italian events in tracing the career of Henry, nor does he ever mention a pope, but one of the three surviving manuscripts of his Gesta was transcribed in Benevento, the Lombard duchy south of Rome. The second book opens with the election of Otto the Great as German king, treats of the risings against his authority, again omitting events in Italy, and concludes with the death of his first wife Edith of England in 946. In the third book the historian deals with Otto's expedition into France, his troubles with his son Liudolf and his son-in-law, Conrad, Duke of Lorraine, and the various wars in Germany.

A manuscript of Res gestae Saxonicae sive annalium libri tres was first published in Basel in 1532 and is today in the British Library. There are two other surviving manuscripts. The best edition was published in 1935 by Paul Hirsch and Hans-Eberhard Lohmann in the series Monumenta Germaniae Historica: Scriptores rerum Germanicarum in usum scholarum editi. A German translation appears in the Quellen zur Geschichte der sächsischen Kaiserzeit published by Albert Bauer and Reinhold Rau in 1971. An English translation is found in an unprinted doctoral dissertation: Raymond F. Wood, The three books of the deeds of the Saxons, by Widukind of Corvey, translated with introduction, notes, and bibliography (University of California, Los Angeles, 1949).

Widukind is also credited with vitae of St Paul and St Thecla doubtless based on the 2nd century Acts of Paul and Thecla, but no traces of them now remain.

== Sources ==
- Bachrach, Bernard S.; Bachrach, David S., eds. (2014). Widukind of Corvey: Deeds of the Saxons. Washington: The Catholic University of America Press.
- Rotter, Ekkehart; Schneidmüller, Bernd, eds. (1981). Widukind von Corvey: Res gestae Saxonicae: Die Sachsengeschichte. Stuttgart: Reclam.
