= 488 BC =

Year 488 BC was a year of the pre-Julian Roman calendar. At the time, it was known as the Year of the Consulship of Rutilus and Furius (or, less frequently, year 266 Ab urbe condita). The denomination 488 BC for this year has been used since the early medieval period, when the Anno Domini calendar era became the prevalent method in Europe for naming years.

== Events ==
=== By place ===
==== Sicily ====
- Theron becomes tyrant of Acragas in Sicily.

==== Rome ====
- Gaius Marcius Coriolanus and Attius Tullius, leading an army of the Volsci, besiege Rome. Coriolanus' mother and wife convince him to break off the siege. In recognition of the service of these women, a temple is erected in Rome dedicated to Fortuna. Subsequently, the Volsci and their allies the Aequi have a falling out, and their armies fight as a result, significantly diminishing the strength of each of them.

==== Greece ====
- Astylos of Croton wins the stadion race at the 73rd Olympic Games.

488 BC in various calendars
- Gregorian calendar: 488 BC; CDLXXXVIII BC
- Ab urbe condita: 266
- Ancient Egypt era: XXVII dynasty, 38
- Pharaoh: Darius I of Persia, 34
- Ancient Greek Olympiad (summer): 73rd Olympiad (victor)¹
- Assyrian calendar: 4263
- Balinese saka calendar: N/A
- Bengali calendar: −1081 – −1080
- Berber calendar: 463
- Buddhist calendar: 57
- Burmese calendar: −1125
- Byzantine calendar: 5021–5022
- Chinese calendar: 壬子年 (Water Rat); 2210 or 2003 — to — 癸丑年 (Water Ox); 2211 or 2004
- Coptic calendar: −771 – −770
- Discordian calendar: 679
- Ethiopian calendar: −495 – −494
- Hebrew calendar: 3273–3274
- Hindu calendars
- Vikram Samvat: −431 – −430
- Shaka Samvat: N/A
- Kali Yuga: 2613–2614
- Holocene calendar: 9513
- Iranian calendar: 1109 BP – 1108 BP
- Islamic calendar: 1143 BH – 1142 BH
- Javanese calendar: N/A
- Julian calendar: N/A
- Korean calendar: 1846
- Minguo calendar: 2399 before ROC 民前2399年
- Nanakshahi calendar: −1955
- Thai solar calendar: 55–56
- Tibetan calendar: ཆུ་ཕོ་བྱི་བ་ལོ་ (male Water-Rat) −361 or −742 or −1514 — to — ཆུ་མོ་གླང་ལོ་ (female Water-Ox) −360 or −741 or −1513
