= Hermanafrid =

Hermanfrid
- King of Thuringia
- Reign: 507–531
- Predecessor: Bertachar
- Died: 532; Zülpich
- Spouse: Amalaberga
- Issue: Amalafrid; Rodelinda
- Father: Bisinus
- Mother: Menia

Hermanfrid (also Hermanifrid or Hermanafrid; Latin: Hermenfredus, died 532) was the last independent king of the Thuringii in present-day Germany. He was one of three sons of King Bisinus and his Lombard queen Menia. His siblings were Baderic; Raicunda, married to the Lombard king Wacho; and Bertachar.

== Biography ==
Between 507 and 511 Hermanfrid married Amalaberga, daughter of Amalafrida who was the daughter of Theodemir. Amalberga was the niece of Theodoric the Great, who received a number of "silver-white" horses from Hermanfrid. It is unclear when Hermanfrid became king, but he is called king (rex thoringorum) in a letter by Theodoric dated to 507. He first shared the rule with his brothers Baderic and Bertachar, but later killed Bertachar in a battle in 529, leaving the young Radegund an orphan.

According to Gregory of Tours, Amalaberga now stirred up Hermanfrid against his remaining brother. Once she laid out only half the table for a meal, and when questioned about the reason, she told him "A king who owns only of half of his kingdom deserved to have half of his table bare." Thus roused, Hermanfrid made a pact with the king of Metz, Theuderic I, to march against Baderic. Baderic was overcome by the Franks and beheaded, but Hermanfrid refused to fulfill his obligations to Theuderic, which led to enmity between the two kings.

In 531 or 532, Theuderic, his son Theudebert I, and his brother King Clotaire I of Soissons attacked the Thuringii. The Franks won a battle near the river Unstrut and took the royal seat at Scithingi (modern Burgscheidungen). Hermanfrid managed to flee, but the Franks captured his niece Radegund (see Venantius Fortunatus, De excidio Thoringae) and his nephews.

Theuderic gave Hermanfrid safe conduct, ordered him to come to Zülpich, and gave him many gifts. While Hermanfrid talked with Theuderic, somebody pushed him from the town walls of Zülpich and he died. Gregory mentions that certain people had ventured to suggest that Theuderic might have had something to do with it.

Radegund was then forced to marry King Clotaire, while Hermanfrid's wife Amalaberga fled to the Ostrogoths with her children Amalafrid and Rodelinda. She was later captured by the Byzantine general Belisarius and sent to Constantinople, where Amalafrid later became an imperial general and Rodelinda was married to the Lombard king Auduin.

The Thuringian kingdom ended with Hermanfrid. The area east of the Saale River was taken over by Slavic tribes, north Thuringia by the Saxons.

The fall of the Thuringian dynasty became the subject of numerous epic treatments, the best known of which is in the Rerum gestarum saxonicarum libri tres by Widukind of Corvey, a Saxon foundation myth written in 967. Rudolph of Fulda tells a related story. In this version, it is the Saxons under Duke Hadugato, as allies of the Franks, who win the great battle on the Unstrut.

== About the sources ==
The main source for this period is Gregory of Tours, who represents the Frankish viewpoint. Widukind is much later and has clearly incorporated mythical elements into his account. Procopius only mentions the events in passing as far as they affect Italy.
