= 488 =

Calendar year

488 in various calendars
Gregorian calendar	488; CDLXXXVIII
Ab urbe condita	1241
Assyrian calendar	5238
Balinese saka calendar	409–410
Bengali calendar	−106 – −105
Berber calendar	1438
Buddhist calendar	1032
Burmese calendar	−150
Byzantine calendar	5996–5997
Chinese calendar	丁卯年 (Fire Rabbit); 3185 or 2978 — to — 戊辰年 (Earth Dragon); 3186 or 2979
Coptic calendar	204–205
Discordian calendar	1654
Ethiopian calendar	480–481
Hebrew calendar	4248–4249
- Hindu calendars
Vikram Samvat	544–545
Shaka Samvat	409–410
Kali Yuga	3588–3589
Holocene calendar	10488
Iranian calendar	134 BP – 133 BP
Islamic calendar	138 BH – 137 BH
Javanese calendar	374–375
Julian calendar	488; CDLXXXVIII
Korean calendar	2821
Minguo calendar	1424 before ROC 民前1424年
Nanakshahi calendar	−980
Seleucid era	799/800 AG
Thai solar calendar	1030–1031
Tibetan calendar	མེ་མོ་ཡོས་ལོ་ (female Fire-Hare); 614 or 233 or −539 — to — ས་ཕོ་འབྲུག་ལོ་ (male Earth-Dragon); 615 or 234 or −538

Year 488 (CDLXXXVIII) was a leap year starting on Friday of the Julian calendar. At the time, it was known as the Year of the Consulship of Ecclesius and Sividius (or, less frequently, year 1241 Ab urbe condita). The denomination 488 for this year has been used since the early medieval period, when the Anno Domini calendar era became the prevalent method in Europe for naming years.

== Events ==
=== By place ===
==== Byzantine Empire ====
- Emperor Zeno regains power from the usurper Leontius and the Isaurian patrician Illus, who are captured and executed, ending a 4-year rebellion (see 484).
- Zeno orders Theodoric the Great to overthrow his rival Odoacer, who has established himself as king of Italy (see 476). He marches with an Ostrogoth army to the West.

==== Europe ====
- According to the Anglo-Saxon Chronicle, Hengist dies and is succeeded by his son Oisc as king of Kent.
- Among the peoples who live on the south bank of the Danube in Noricum ripense and who are de facto ruled by the Rugii, whose empire has its centre near Krems on the north bank, are Romii who had been evacuated earlier from Danube settlements above the River Enns. They include members of the Severin convent. Because some of the Rugii want to fight for East Rome against Odoacer, they destroy the Rugian Empire and allow the Romii to be evacuated to Italy by his brother, Hunulf, in order to prevent the re-establishment of the Rugian Empire by a surviving prince. The northern Danubian Limes of the Roman Empire are effectively abandoned. Even the relics of Severinus of Noricum are carried with them.
- The Gepids capture Belgrade.

==== Persia ====
- Kavadh I is crowned by the nobles, and succeeds his blind uncle Balash as the 19th king of Persia.

==== Asia ====
- Ninken, adopted heir of Seinei, succeeds his brother Kenzō and becomes new emperor of Japan.

=== By topic ===
==== Religion ====
- Peter the Fuller is succeeded by Palladius as patriarch of Antioch.
- Fravitta becomes patriarch of Constantinople.

== Births ==
- He Di, emperor of Southern Qi (d. 502)
- Senán mac Geirrcinn, Irish saint
- Yu, empress of Northern Wei (d. 507)

== Deaths ==
- Balash, king of the Persian Empire
- Hengest, leader of Kent
- Illus, Byzantine general
- Leontius, Byzantine usurper
- Peter the Fuller, patriarch of Antioch
