= Baderic =

6th century Thuringian king

Baderic, Baderich, Balderich or Boderic (c. 480 – 529), son of Bisinus and Menia, was a co-king of the Thuringii. He and his brothers Hermanfrid and Berthar succeeded their father Bisinus. After Hermanfrid defeated Berthar in battle, he invited King Theuderic I of Metz to help him defeat Baderic in return for half of the kingdom. Theuderic I agreed and Baderic was defeated and killed in 529. Hermanfrid became the sole king.

== Notes ==
- Victor Duruy (1918). A Short History of France. J. M. Dent. p. 86.
