= Theuderic I =

King of Metz (c. 487–534)

Theuderic I *Þeudurik
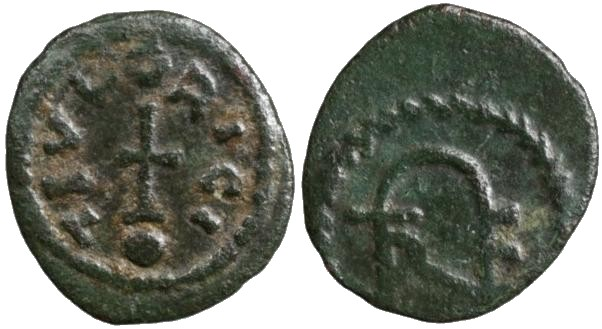
- Bronze coin of Theuderic I

King of Metz
- Reign: 511–534
- Predecessor: Clovis I
- Successor: Theudebert I
- Born: c. 487
- Died: c. 534 (aged 46–47)
- Spouse: Eustère of Visigothia; Suavegotha
- Issue: Theudebert I Theodechild
- Dynasty: Merovingian
- Father: Clovis I

Theuderic I (Note: Also spelled Theuderich, Theoderic, or Theodoric; in French, Thierry) (c. 487 – 534) was the Merovingian king of Metz, Rheims, or Austrasia—as it is variously called—from 511 to 534.

He was the son of Clovis I and one of his earlier wives or concubines (possibly a Franco-Rhenish Princess, Evochildis of Cologne). In accordance with Salian tradition, Clovis's kingdom was divided between his four surviving sons, who also included Childebert I in Paris, Chlodomer in Orléans, and Chlothar I in Soissons. Theuderic inherited Metz in 511 at his father's death. Early in his reign, he sent his son Theudebert to kill the Scandinavian King Chlochilaich (Hygelac of Beowulf fame) who had invaded his realm.

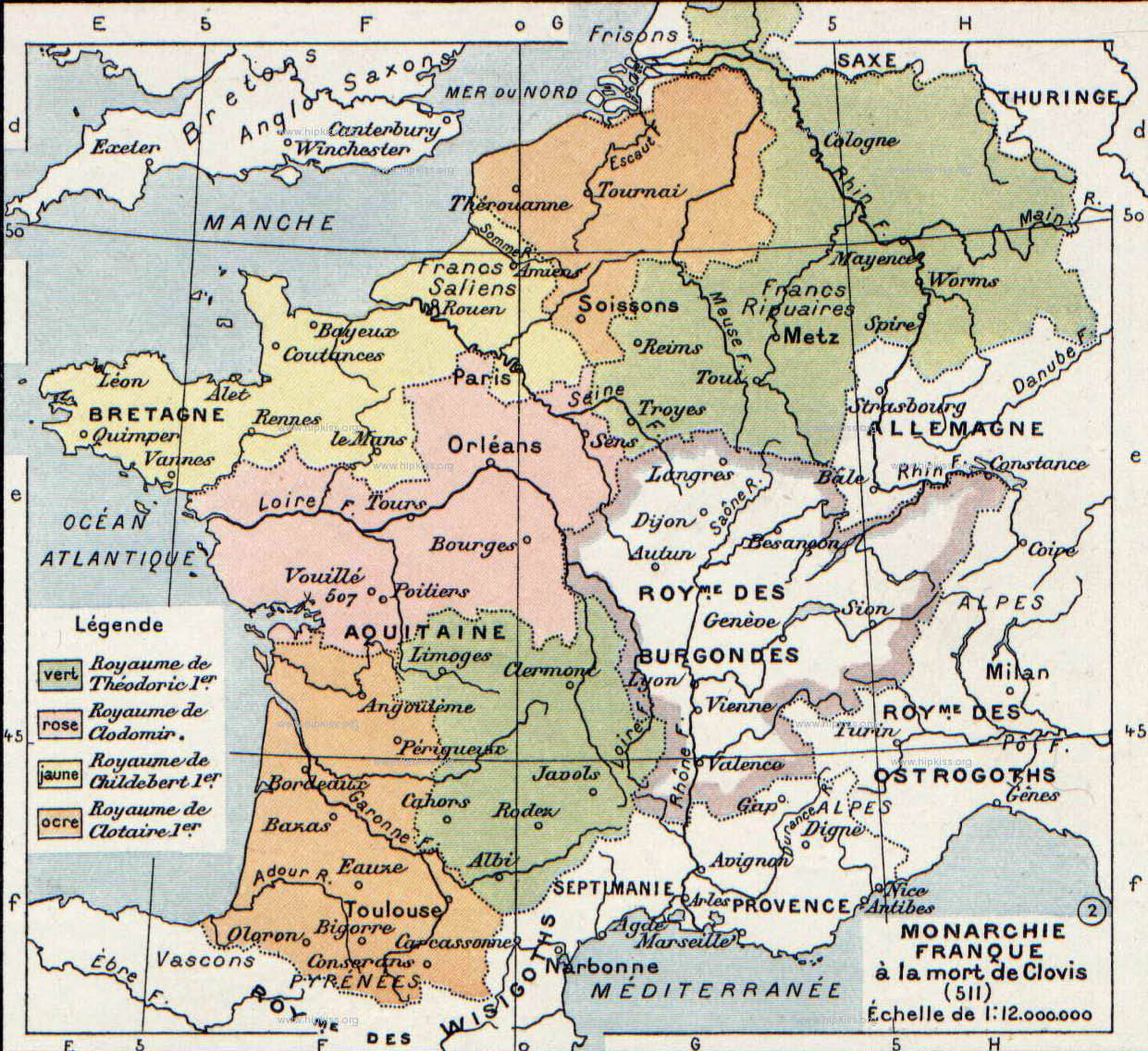
Division of Gaul on Clovis's death, showing Theuderic's kingdom beside his brothers'

Theuderic got involved in the war between the Thuringian King Hermanfrid and his brother Baderic. Theuderic was promised half of Thuringia for his help; Baderic was defeated, but the land promised was not given up. In 531, Theuderic then, with his brother Chlothar and his son, attacked Thuringia to avenge himself on Hermanfrid. With the assistance of the Saxons under Duke Hadugato, Thuringia was conquered, and Chlothar received Radegund, daughter of King Berthar (Hermanfrid's late brother). Hermanfrid was killed in battle at Unstrut and his kingdom was annexed.

The four sons of Clovis then all fought the Burgundian kings Sigismund and Godomar; Godomar fled and Sigismund was taken prisoner by Chlodomer. Theuderic married Sigismund's daughter Suavegotha. Godomar rallied the Burgundian army and won back his kingdom. Chlodomer, aided by Theuderic, defeated Godomar, but died in the fighting at Vézeronce.

After making a treaty with his brother Childebert, Theuderic died in 534. Upon his death the throne of Metz, passed (without hindrance, unexpectedly) to his son Theudebert. Theuderic also left a daughter Theodechild (by his wife Suavegotha, daughter of the defeated Sigismund of Burgundy). Theodechild founded the Abbey of St-Pierre le Vif at Sens.

== Sources ==
- Herbermann, Charles, ed. (1913). "Sens". Catholic Encyclopedia. Robert Appleton Company.
- Wood, Ian N. (1994). The Merovingian Kingdoms, 450–751. Longman.

Theuderic I Merovingian dynasty Born: 487 Died: 534
Preceded by Clovis I	King of Rheims; 511–534	Succeeded by Theudebert I
