= Bertachar =

6th century Thuringian king

Bertachar (or Berthachar) was a king of Thuringia from about 510 until about 525, co-ruling with his brothers Hermanfrid and Baderic.

Bertachar was probably not a Thuringian himself. Frankish sources, such as Venantius Fortunatus, make the three brothers sons of King Bisinus. They are sometimes considered as sons of Bisinus' wife Menia, or else as sons of Basina, who is called a wife of Bisinus by the Frankish historian Gregory of Tours. Many scholars, however, reject Bisinus' marriage to Basina as ahistorical, leaving Menia as his only known wife.

Bertachar's rule probably began between 507 and 511. He was murdered by his brother Hermanfrid, who later murdered Baderic to become sole ruler of Thuringia. This assassination may have taken place as early as 525.

Bertachar had at least one daughter and, depending on the source, one or several sons. His sons are unnamed. His daughter, Radegund, married the Frankish king Chlothar I and founded Holy Cross Abbey in Poitiers. She is revered as a saint in the Catholic Church. Two hagiographies of her were produced by her friends Baudonivia and Venantius Fortunatus. Fortunatus specifies that she was "from the Thuringian region", a daughter of King Bertachar and a granddaughter of King Bisinus.

== Sources ==
Primary sources

- Venantius Honoricus Clementianus Fortunatus, Vita Sanctae Radegundis, ed. Bruno Krusch. MGH SS rer. Merov. 2 (Hanover, 1888), 364–377.

Secondary sources

- Burns, Thomas S. (1984). A History of the Ostrogoths. Indiana University Press.
- Halsall, Guy (2001). "Childeric's Grave, Clovis' Succession, and the Origins of the Merovingian Kingdom". In Ralph Mathisen; Danuta Shanzer (eds.). Society and Culture in Late Antique Gaul. Routledge. pp. 130–147.
- Hartmann, Martina (2009). Die Königin im frühen Mittelalter. Kohlhammer Verlag.
- Jarnut, Jörg (2009). "Thüringer und Langobarden im 6. und beginnenden 7. Jahrhundert". In Helmut Castritius; Dieter Geuenich; Matthias Werner (eds.). Die Frühzeit der Thüringer: Archäologie, Sprache, Geschichte. De Gruyter. pp. 279–290.
- Martindale, John R., ed. (1980). The Prosopography of the Later Roman Empire: Volume II, AD 395–527. Cambridge: Cambridge University Press. ISBN 0-521-20159-4.
- Mladjov, Ian (2014). "Barbarian Genealogies". In H. B. Dewing (trans.); Anthony Kaldellis (eds.). The Wars of Justinian by Prokopios. Hackett. pp. 560–566.
- Neumeister, Peter (2014). "The Ancient Thuringians: Problems of Names and Family Connections". In Janine Fries-Knoblach; Heiko Steuer; John Hines (eds.). The Baiuvarii and Thuringi: An Ethnographic Perspective. Boydell. pp. 83–102.
