= Thuringi =

Early Germanic people native to Thuringia (now part of Germany)

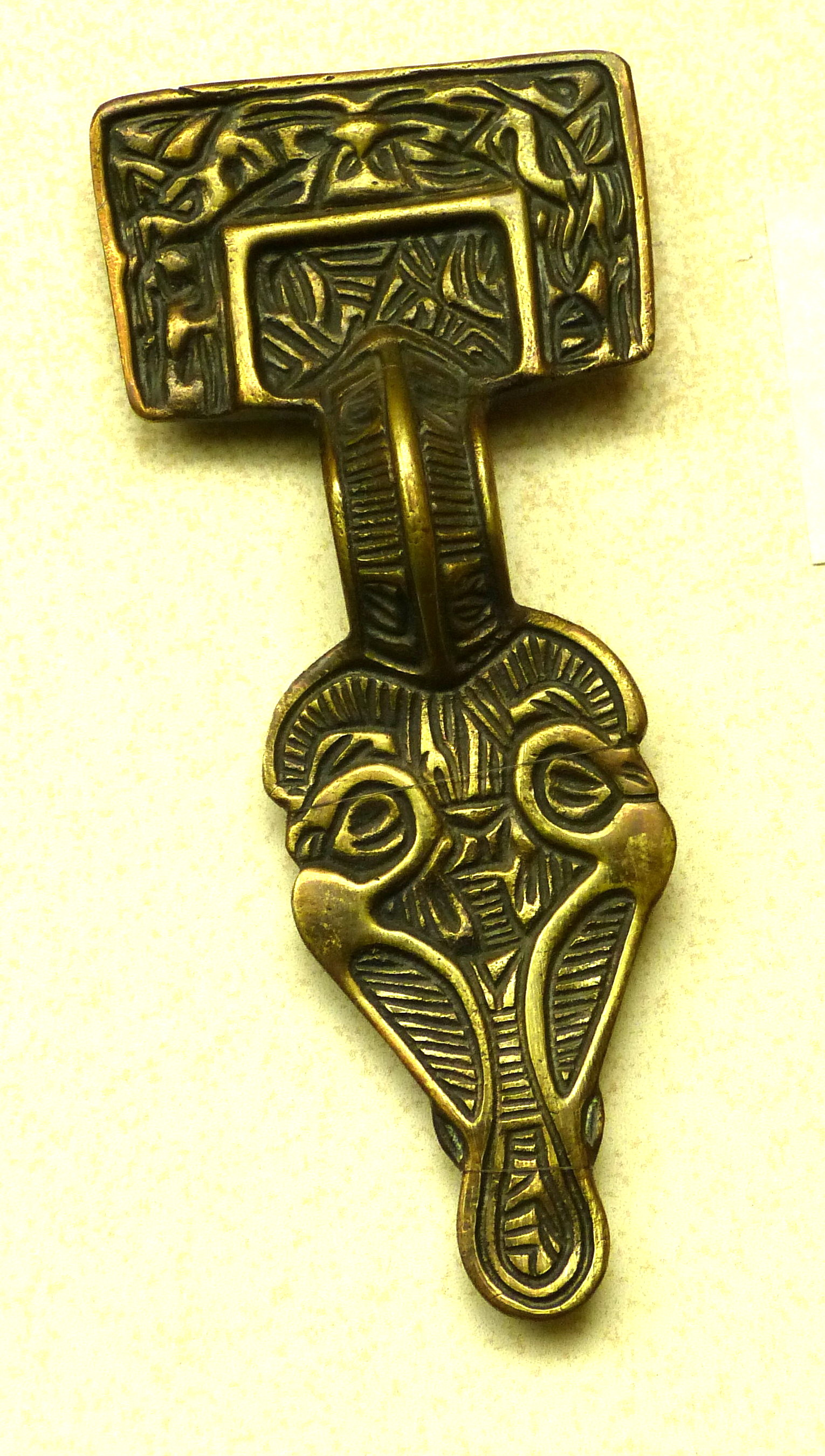
Fibula found in Mühlhausen, 4th/5th century AD

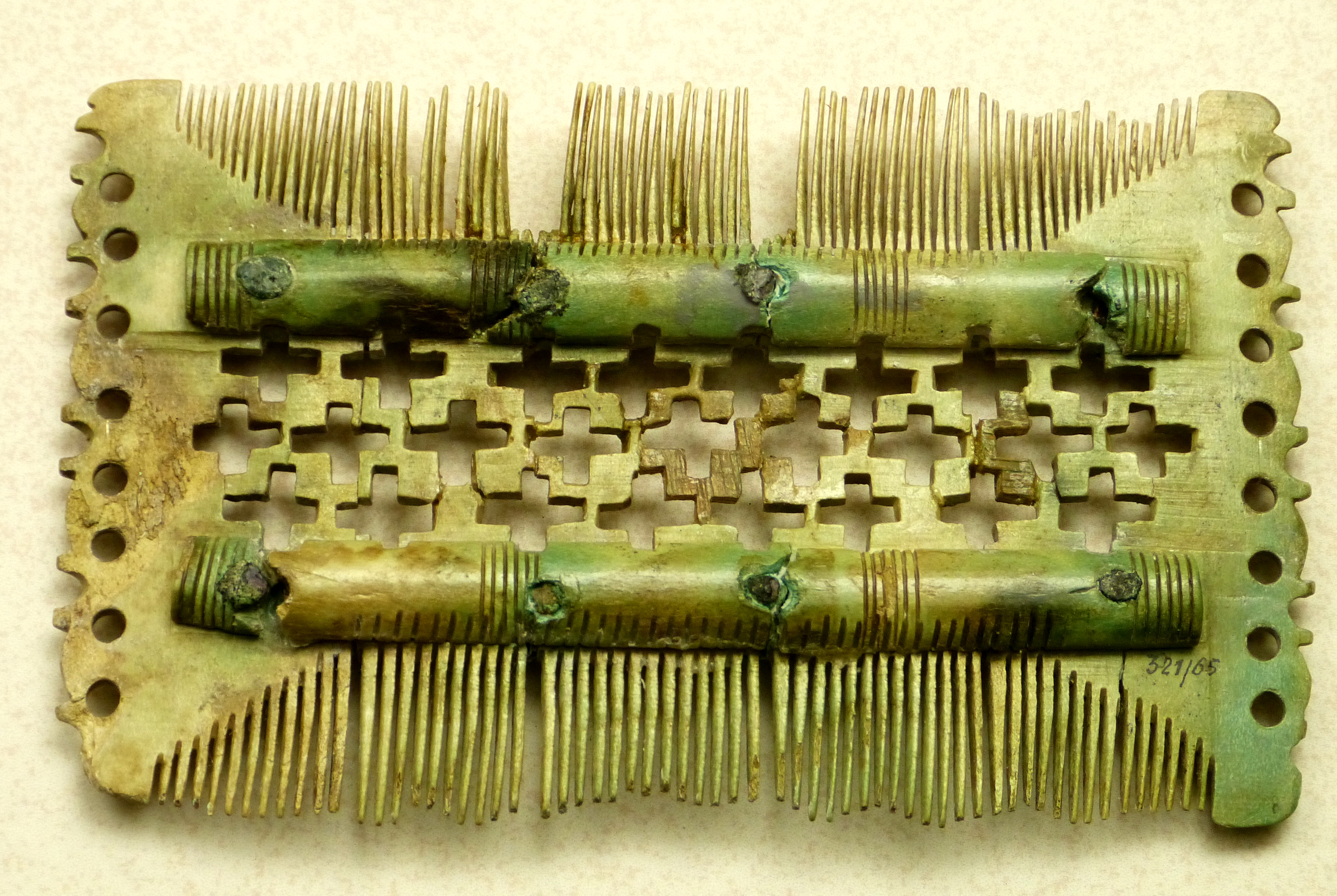
Ancient Germanic bone comb, Thuringia

The Thuringi, or Thuringians were a Germanic people who lived in their own kingdom in what is now Central Germany. They are first mentioned in written records starting in the fifth century, during a period when the Huns were the most influential force in Central Europe and the Western Roman Empire lost control of this region.

The kingdom's early history and boundaries are uncertain. However, the medieval kingdom, and the modern German federal state which is still called Thuringia, lies between the Harz in the north, and the Thuringian forest in the south.

On the other hand there are indications in near-contemporary records that early forms of this kingdom stretched further south, to northern Bavaria, and further east, to the Rhine somewhere in the stretch between Mainz and Xanten.

This medieval Thuringian kingdom came into conflict with the Merovingian Franks, and it later became a stem duchy within the Frankish realm.

== Name origins ==
The Thuringians do not appear in classical Roman texts under that name. This has led to several proposals connecting them to peoples known from earlier periods.

- In older scholarship it has traditionally been presumed that they were the remnants of the Hermanduri. Johann Kaspar Zeuss for example proposed that the last part of the name (Duri) was the tribal name. Two objections to this tradition have been explained by Matthias Springer. Firstly linguistically, the pronunciation of the "th" sound in the Latin name for Thuringians is believed to have been like an English "th", but this sound could not have evolved from d-sounds in Germanic. Secondly geographically, the Hermunduri didn't live in or near the area of medieval Thuringia. Tacitus, in his Germania, describes the Hermunduri in about 100 AD living in a region stretching from an area where the Elbe starts, all the way to the Danube where it formed the northern boundary of the Roman province of Rhaetia. This is far to the south of medieval Thuringia.
- Another early people sometimes proposed as forerunners of the Thuringians because of their name are the Teuriochaemae, who were described by Claudius Ptolemy as living just north of what he called the "Sudetes" mountains in the second century. According to this proposal, "Chaemae" may represent a version of the Germanic word for "home".
- Since the late 20th century a new proposal (or old proposal with new support) has been that the Thuringi were actually descended somehow from the Tervingians, who were a Gothic people who entered central Europe from the east during the period of Hunnic dominance.
- Another old proposal which has renewed support is that they may be the same as the Torcilingi (or Thorcilingi) who were a people (or tribe or dynasty) mentioned only by the 6th century author Jordanes, and authors who drew upon his works, when describing Odoacer. Jordanes referred to Odoacer once as "king of the Torcilingi", once as the "king of the Thorcilingi and Rogi" (regis Thorcilingorum Rogorumque), and once as being "by origin Rugian, strengthened by crowds of Thorcilingi, of Sciri and of Heruli" (genere Rogus Thorcilingorum Scirorum Herolorumque turbas munitus).

== First appearances ==
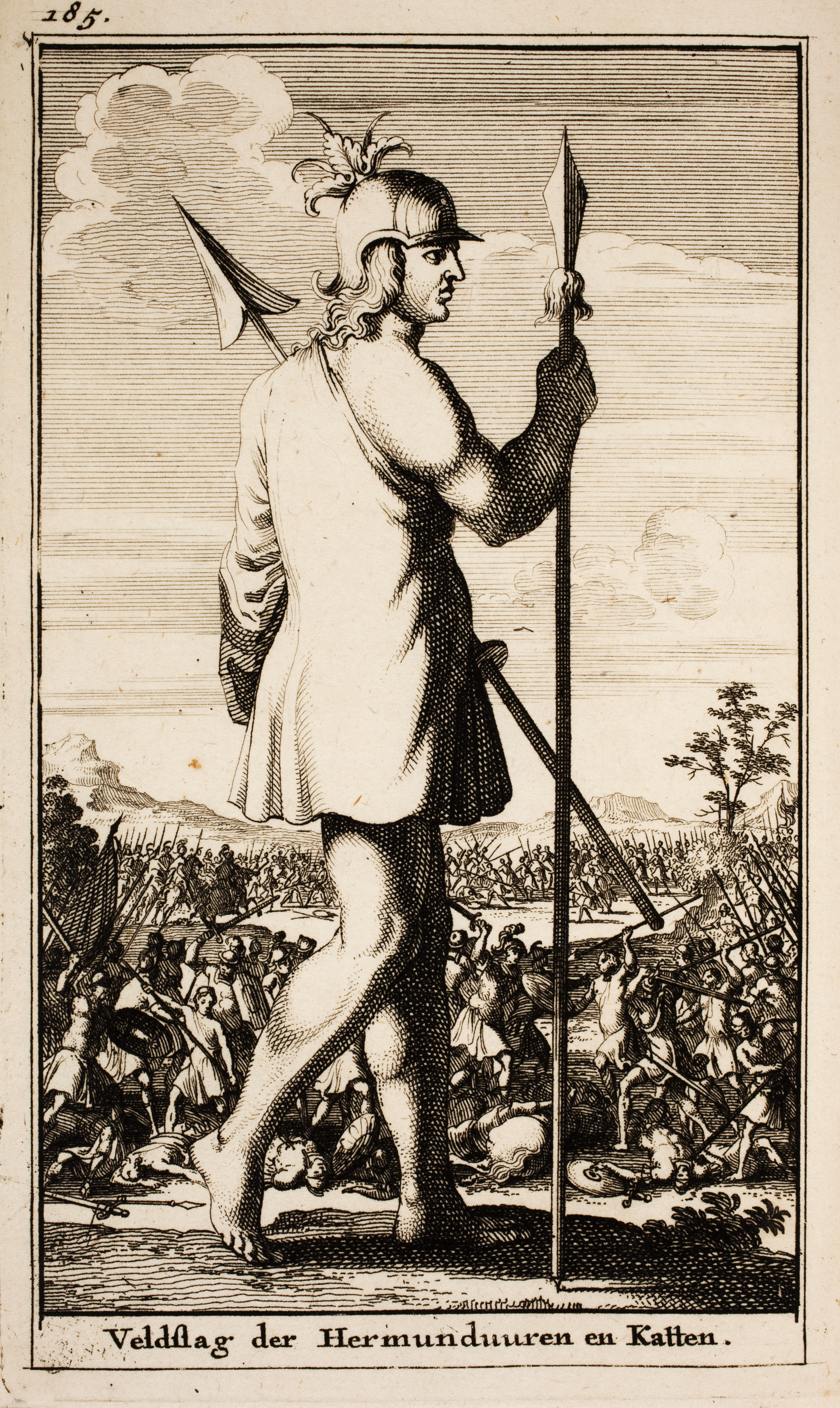
Image from "Battle of Hermunduri and Chatti", 1717

The name of the Thuringians appears to have first been mentioned in the veterinary treatise (Mulomedicina) of Vegetius, written about 383-450 AD. The text specifically mentions Thuringian horses, which it pairs together with the Burgundian horses: "the Thuringian and the Burgundian horses … can be recognized by their patient endurance of poor treatment" (Toringos dehinc et Burgundiones iniuriae tolerantes). Historians such as Matthias Springer have noted that other early medieval evidence also exists which implies a connection between the Thuringians and Burgundians.

The second mention of the Thuringians is as allies of Attila the Hun who joined his invasion of Gaul in 451. Sidonius Apollinaris listed them among the invaders writing only a few years later, in Gaul itself. From this it can be inferred that the Thuringians were present in the Battle of the Catalaunian Plains.

The early 6th century writer Eugippius, who was writing about the 460s and 470s, reported that the Thuringians carried out raids south of the Danube, into Roman imperial territory near Passau and Linz. Some scholars see this as implying that they lived close to the Danube at this time. Eugippius was himself living in this region until the death of Saint Severinus of Noricum in 482.

Before 464 when Aegidius died the Frankish King Childeric I (died about 481), according to Gregory of Tours and Fredegar, took refuge with the Thuringi and then married the runaway wife of their king, named Basina, but the story may be distorted. (For example, the area of Tongeren, now in Belgium, may have been intended.)

In about 470, Jordanes, writing in the 6th century, described the Thuringi already living immediately north of the Alemanni and Suevi, when the latter were attacked by the Ostrogoths. He placed the Burgundians south of the Alemanni, and the Franks immediately to their west. This is also one of the earliest reports of the early Bavarians, who he placed to the east of the Alemanni.

Another 6th-century historian, Procopius, wrote that the "Thoringi" lived on the eastern border of the 5th-century Franks, in lands that had originally been granted to them by the first emperor Augustus (died 14 AD). To their south lived the Burgundians, and "beyond" the Thoringi, lived the Suebi and Alemanni, who he called powerful nations.

Similarly, the Ravenna Cosmography, which was possibly written using 5th and 6th century sources, described the Thuringians as eastern neighbours of the Franks, separated from them only by the Rhine river, and living in the region which was once called "Germania". To their north were Frisians and Saxons, and two rivers of Thuringia were named as the "Bec" and the "Reganum". The latter is specifically described as a river which merges into the Danube, and is generally accepted to be the Regen, which is today in Bavaria rather than Thuringia.

These early sources have been seen by some scholars as evidence that the Thuringians originally ruled over lands stretching to the northwest as far as the Rhine north of the Main, and close to the Danube in the southeast.

In the period 493-507 Theoderic the Great (died 526) wrote a letter which is preserved in the Variae of Cassiodorus, addressed to the kings of the Warini (Guarni), Heruli and Thuringians. He urged them to join him in support of the Visigothic kingdom of Alaric II, who was under attack from the lawless aggression of Clovis I, which threatened all of them. He reminded the three kings that Alaric's father Euric (reigned 466-484) had once supported them, but he does not give details about how. Clovis conquered the Visigoths of Alaric II in 507 at the Battle of Vouillé.

In another letter Theoderic wrote specifically to "Herminafrid, king of the Thuringians" and this was sent with the embassy which accompanied his niece to Thuringia (Thoringia) for her marriage (9, XII, 114). The letter also mentions that Theoderic had received as a gift of horses from Herminafrid.

According to Gregory of Tours, this Herminafrid killed his brother Berthachar, and then allied himself with the Frankish king of Austrasia, Theuderic I (died 534), against another brother named Baderich, who fell in battle. Theuderic and his son and brother subsequently defeated Herminafrid in two battles and took control of the Unstrut region. According to Gregory, Herminafrid died in Zülpich, where he was staying for negotiations, as the result of an assassination attempt.

== Relationship with Warini, Anglii and Saxons ==
The sixth-century historian Procopius described the Warini living in a large area which stretched from near the Danube as far as the Rhine delta and the Ocean coast, stretching from the Danes to the Franks. In another passage he places The Thuringi east of the Franks, across the Rhine. It has been proposed that in this period the terms Warini and Thuringi covered the same peoples, or overlapping groups of peoples.

The Ravenna Cosmography in contrast placed the Saxons of "Old Saxony" between the Thuringi and Ocean, and the Frisians, Franks and Danes. Procopius does not mention Saxons at all, and only mentions Frisins and Anglii as living on the island of Brittia, not on the continent.

The Carolingian law code written for the Thuringi was called the "law of the Angles and Warini that is the Thuringians".

Centuries earlier, in his Germania for example, Tacitus had grouped the Anglii and Warini together within a group of Suebic tribes, living beyond the Elbe, and near the Baltic sea, where they worshipped a goddess called Nerthus.

== Political history ==
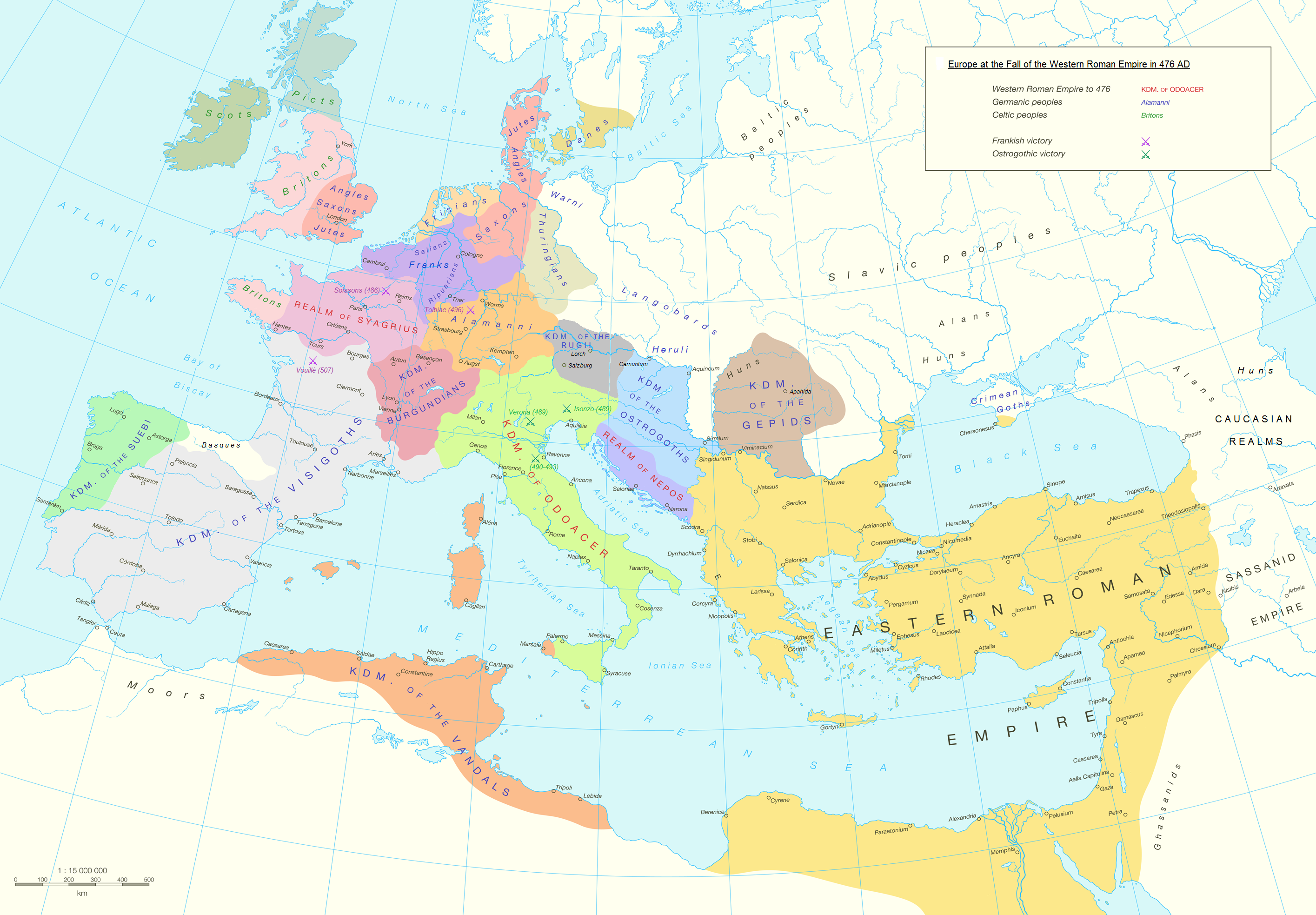
Europe at the fall of the Western Roman Empire in 476 AD.

The Thuringi established an empire in the late fifth century. It reached its territorial peak in the first half of the sixth century, before it was conquered by the Franks in 531–532.

Under the leadership of Alboin, a large group of Thuringi joined the Lombards on their migration into Italy. The Lombard king Agilulf (590–616) was of Thuringian descent.

After their conquest, the Thuringi were placed under Frankish dukes, but they rebelled and had regained their independence by the late seventh century under Radulf. Towards the end of this century, parts of Thuringia came under Saxon rule.

By the time of Charles Martel and Saint Boniface, they were again subject to the Franks and ruled by Frankish dukes, with their seat at Würzburg in the south. Under Martel, the Thuringian dukes' authority was extended over a part of Austrasia and the Bavarian plateau. The valleys of the Lahn, Main, and Neckar rivers were included. The Naab formed the south-eastern border of Thuringia at the time. The Werra and Fulda valleys were within it also and it reached as far as the Saxon plain in the north. Its central location in Germania, beyond the Rhine, was the reason it became the point d'appui of Boniface's mission work.

The Thuringi had a separate identity as late as 785–786, when one of their leading men, Hardrad, led an abortive insurrection against Charlemagne. The Carolingians codified the Thuringian legal customs (but perhaps did not use them extensively) as the Lex Thuringorum and continued to exact a tribute of pigs, presumably a Merovingian imposition, from the province. In the tenth century, under the Ottonians, the centre of Thuringian power lay in the north-east, near Erfurt. As late as the end of the tenth century, the porcine tribute was still being accepted by the King of Germany.

== Archaeology ==
Examination of Thuringian grave sites reveal cranial features which suggest the strong presence of Hunnic women or slaves, perhaps indicating that many Thuringians took Hunnic wives or Hunnic slaves following the collapse of the Hunnic Empire. There is also evidence from jewellery found in graves that the Thuringians sought marriages with Ostrogothic and Lombard women.

== Ecclesiastical history ==
Christianity had reached the Thuringi in the fifth century, but their exposure to it was limited. Their real Christianisation took place, alongside the ecclesiastical organisation of their territory, during the early and mid eighth century under Boniface, who felled their "sacred oak" at Geismar in 724, abolishing the vestiges of their paganism.

In the 1020s, Aribo, Archbishop of Mainz, began the minting of coins at Erfurt, the oldest market town in Thuringia with a history going back to the Merovingian period. The economy, especially trade (such as with the Slavs), greatly increased after that.

== Social history ==
The Thuringian nobility, which had an admixture of Frankish, Thuringian, and Saxon blood, was not as landed as that of Francia. There was also a larger population of free peasant farmers than in Francia, though there was still a large number of serfs. The obligations of serfs there were also generally less oppressive. There were also fewer clergymen before Boniface came. There was a small number of artisans and merchants, mostly trading with the Slavs to the east. The town of Erfurt was the easternmost trading post in Frankish territory at the time.

== Historiography ==
The history of the Thuringi is best known from the writings concerning their conquerors, the Franks. Gregory of Tours, a Gallo-Roman, includes the nearest account in time of the fall of the Thuringian Empire. Widukind of Corvey, writing in tenth-century Saxony, inundates his similar account with various legends.

The Thuringi make brief appearances in contemporary Italian sources when their activities affect the land south of the Alps. Procopius, the Eastern Roman author, mentions them and speaks of their fall. The seventh-century Origo Gentis Langobardorum mentions a king of the Thuringi, Fisud, as a contemporary of Theudebert I.

== Sources ==
- Halsall, Guy (2007). Barbarian Migrations and the Roman West, 376–568. Cambridge Medieval Textbooks. Cambridge: Cambridge University Press. ISBN 978-0-521-43491-1.
- Maenchen-Helfen, Otto (1947). "Communications". The American Historical Review. 52 (4): 836–841. doi:10.1086/ahr/52.4.836. JSTOR 1842348.
- Reynolds, Robert L.; Lopez, Robert S. (1946). "Odoacer: German or Hun?". The American Historical Review. 52 (1): 36–53. doi:10.1086/ahr/52.1.36. JSTOR 1845067.
- Reuter, Timothy (2014-06-06). Germany in the Early Middle Ages c. 800-1056. Routledge. ISBN 978-1-317-87239-9.
- Schutz, Herbert (2000). The Germanic Realms in Pre-Carolingian Central Europe, 400-750. P. Lang. ISBN 978-0-8204-4965-4.
- Springer, Matthias (2005), "Thüringer (§ 2. Historisch. Frühzeit; § 3. Das Thüringerreich oder die Thüringerreiche)", in Beck, Heinrich; Geuenich, Dieter; Steuer, Heiko (eds.), Reallexikon der Germanischen Altertumskunde, vol. 30 (2 ed.), De Gruyter, pp. 521–530, ISBN 978-3-11-018385-6
- Springer, Matthias (2006), "Warnen", in Beck, Heinrich; Geuenich, Dieter; Steuer, Heiko (eds.), Reallexikon der Germanischen Altertumskunde, vol. 33 (2 ed.), de Gruyter, pp. 274–281, ISBN 978-3-11-018388-7
- Springer, Matthias (2009), "Zwischen (H)Ermunduren und Thüringern besteht kein Zusammenhang", in Castritius, Helmut; Geuenich, Dieter; Werner, Matthias (eds.), Die Frühzeit der Thüringer. Archäologie, Sprache, Geschichte, Reallexikon der Germanischen Altertumskunde - Ergänzungsbände, vol. 63, De Gruyter, ISBN 978-3-11-021454-3
- Udolph, Jürgen (2005), "Thüringer § 1. Namenkundlich", in Beck, Heinrich; Geuenich, Dieter; Steuer, Heiko (eds.), Reallexikon der Germanischen Altertumskunde, vol. 30 (2 ed.), De Gruyter, pp. 519–521, ISBN 978-3-11-018385-6
