= 480 =

Calendar year

480 in various calendars
- Gregorian calendar: 480; CDLXXX
- Ab urbe condita: 1233
- Assyrian calendar: 5230
- Balinese saka calendar: 401–402
- Bengali calendar: −114 – −113
- Berber calendar: 1430
- Buddhist calendar: 1024
- Burmese calendar: −158
- Byzantine calendar: 5988–5989
- Chinese calendar: 己未年 (Earth Goat); 3177 or 2970 — to — 庚申年 (Metal Monkey); 3178 or 2971
- Coptic calendar: 196–197
- Discordian calendar: 1646
- Ethiopian calendar: 472–473
- Hebrew calendar: 4240–4241
- Hindu calendars
- Vikram Samvat: 536–537
- Shaka Samvat: 401–402
- Kali Yuga: 3580–3581
- Holocene calendar: 10480
- Iranian calendar: 142 BP – 141 BP
- Islamic calendar: 146 BH – 145 BH
- Javanese calendar: 365–367
- Julian calendar: 480; CDLXXX
- Korean calendar: 2813
- Minguo calendar: 1432 before ROC 民前1432年
- Nanakshahi calendar: −988
- Seleucid era: 791/792 AG
- Thai solar calendar: 1022–1023
- Tibetan calendar: ས་མོ་ལུག་ལོ་ (female Earth-Sheep); 606 or 225 or −547 — to — ལྕགས་ཕོ་སྤྲེ་ལོ་ (male Iron-Monkey); 607 or 226 or −546

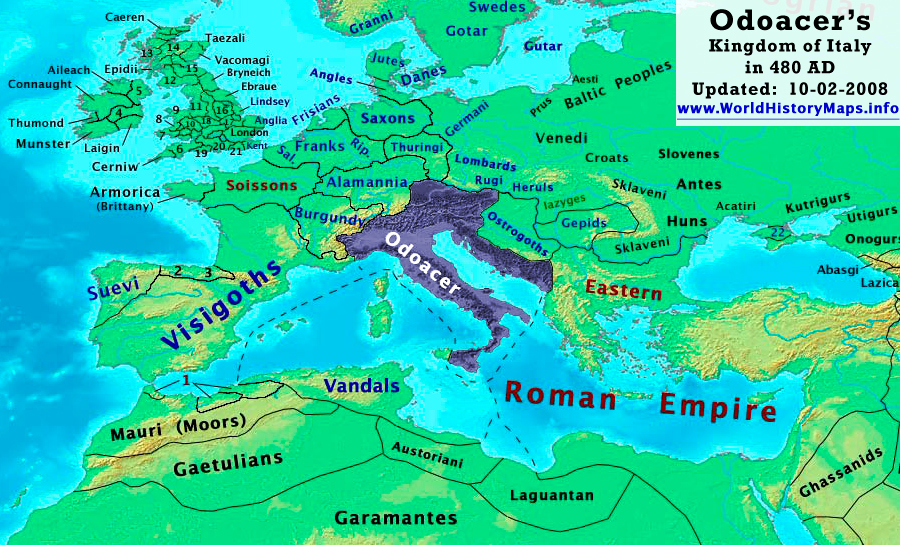
Kingdom of Italy under Odoacer (480)

Year 480 (CDLXXX) was a leap year starting on Tuesday of the Julian calendar. At the time, it was known as the Year of the Consulship of Basilius without colleague (or, less frequently, year 1233 Ab urbe condita). The denomination 480 for this year has been used since the early medieval period, when the Anno Domini calendar era became the prevalent method in Europe for naming years.

== Events ==
=== By place ===
==== Byzantine Empire ====
- Emperor Zeno officially dissolves the east/west co-emperorship, ruling as the first sole emperor of Rome in 85 years. The position of emperor is never again divided.

==== Balkans ====
- Julius Nepos, former emperor of the Western Roman Empire, dies in exile in Dalmatia (he is murdered by his own soldiers, in his villa, near Salona).
- December 9 – Odoacer occupies Dalmatia and prosecutes Nepos's killers. He later establishes his political power with the co-operation of the Roman Senate.

==== Europe ====
- King Chilperic I dies and is succeeded by his nephew Gundobad, whose realm covers much of eastern Gaul and has two capitals, at Lyon and Geneva. He rules the Kingdom of Burgundy with his brothers Chilperic II, Gundomar and Godegisel.
- Syagrius, ruler of Domain of Soissons, manages to maintain the Roman authority in northern Gaul. He defends his "kingdom" against the neighbouring Salian Franks.
- The Visigoths under King Euric extend their rule from the Loire to Gibraltar (approximate date).
- Ireland: The Diocese of Connor is erected.

==== Asia ====
- Budhagupta, ruler of the Gupta Empire, establishes diplomatic relations with the Kannauj Kingdom and drives the Huns out of the fertile plains of northern India.
- Prince Seinei succeeds his father Yūryaku and becomes the 22nd emperor of Japan.

=== By topic ===
==== Religion ====
- Constantius of Lyon begins his research for his book Vita sancta Germani ("on the Life of Germanus"). He also writes a hagiography of Germanus of Auxerre (approximate date).

== Births ==
- Baderic, king of the Thuringi (approximate date)
- Benedict of Nursia, monasticist (approximate date)
- Boethius, Roman philosopher and writer (d. 524)
- Dignāga, Buddhist founder of Indian logic (d. 540)
- Eutharic, Visigothic prince (approximate date)
- Gelimer, king of the Vandals and Alans (d. 553)
- Scholastica, Christian nun (approximate date)
- Xiao Zhaowen, emperor of Southern Qi (d. 494)
- Zu Gengzhi, Chinese mathematician (d. 525)

== Deaths ==
- Chilperic I, king of Burgundy
- Conall Cremthainne, king of Uisneach (Ireland)
- Erbin of Dumnonia, Brythonic king (approximate date)
- Julius Nepos, Western Roman Emperor
- Nechtan I, king of the Picts
- Tydfil, female saint (approximate date)
