= Godomar I =

Burgundian Prince

Godomar I (? – 476) was a son of the Burgundian king Gondioc, and a brother of Godegisel, Chilperic II and Gundobad. After the death of Gondioc and his brother Chilperic I, the four sons of Gondioc are said to have ruled Burgundy together from different parts of the kingdom. This is doubted by modern scholars due to lack of evidence. It is now believed that both Godomar and Chilperic had died before 476/477, and that only Godegisel and Gundobad shared the rule.

== Sources ==
- Reinhold Kaiser: Die Burgunder (= Kohlhammer-Urban-Taschenbücher. Bd. 586). Kohlhammer Verlag, Stuttgart 2004, ISBN 3-17-016205-5, S. 57 und S. 114–116.
