= Teudelinda =

5th c queen consort of Burgundy

Teudelinda (5th-century – d. 501) was a Burgundian queen consort by marriage to king Godegisel. She founded a number of churches around Geneva. Teudelinda was killed at Vienne during the war between her husband and his brother, Gundobad.

== History ==
No information has been preserved about the origin and early life of Theudelinda. She is mentioned in historical sources already at the time when she was the wife of Godegisel, one of the rulers of the Burgundian kingdom at the end of the fifth century.

Hagiographical works describe Theudelinda as a devout Christian who especially honored the warrior-martyrs of the Theban Legion. With the support of Bishop Dormitianus, Theudelinda, together with her relative Sedeleuba, built in and around Geneva several churches consecrated in honor of these saints. Among them is the Cathedral of Saints Ursa and Victor in Solothurn.

According to Frederick George Holweck, in 480 the body of Victor was brought to Geneva by the Burgundian Queen Theudelinde. He is buried in the former St-Victor's Basilica in Geneva. Gregor Reinhold, writing in the Catholic Encyclopedia attributes this to Sedeleuba, who had a basilica built dedicated to Victor. (He also says Sedeleuba was a sister to Clotilde, wife of Clovis, King of the Franks.)

Together with her husband, Theudelinda founded the monastery of St. Peter in Lyon. It is assumed that the Arian Godegisel did so both to rally his subjects in anticipation of a possible military clash with his brother Gundobad and to strengthen his alliance with the King of the Franks, Clovis.

In the year 500 an internecine war broke out between Godegisel and Gundobad. At first, success was on the side of Theudelinda's husband, who, with the help of Clovis, managed to defeat Gundobad's army in a battle near Dijon. Godegisel, however, failed to capture his brother when he besieged him at Avignon, and in the following year he himself was besieged at Vienne. This siege ended with the capture of the city by Gundobad's warriors.

By order of his brother, Godegisel, who had taken refuge in the church, was killed. Gundobad also ordered the execution of the wife and children of Godegisel: Queen Theudelinda was drowned in the Rhone, and two sons (the older of them, perhaps, named Hilperic) beheaded and thrown into a well. Only the two granddaughters of Theudelinda and Godegisel (probably daughters of Prince Hilperic) were spared because of their young age: Gunteka and Sedelevbeuda.
