= 480th =

480th may refer to:

- 480th Fighter Squadron, active United States Air Force unit
- 480th Intelligence, Surveillance and Reconnaissance Wing (480th ISR Wing) is headquartered at Langley Air Force Base, Va.

== See also ==
- 480 (number)
- 480, the year 480 (CDLXXX) of the Julian calendar
- 480 BC
