= Kingdom of Burgundy =

Name of various European kingdoms during the Middle Ages

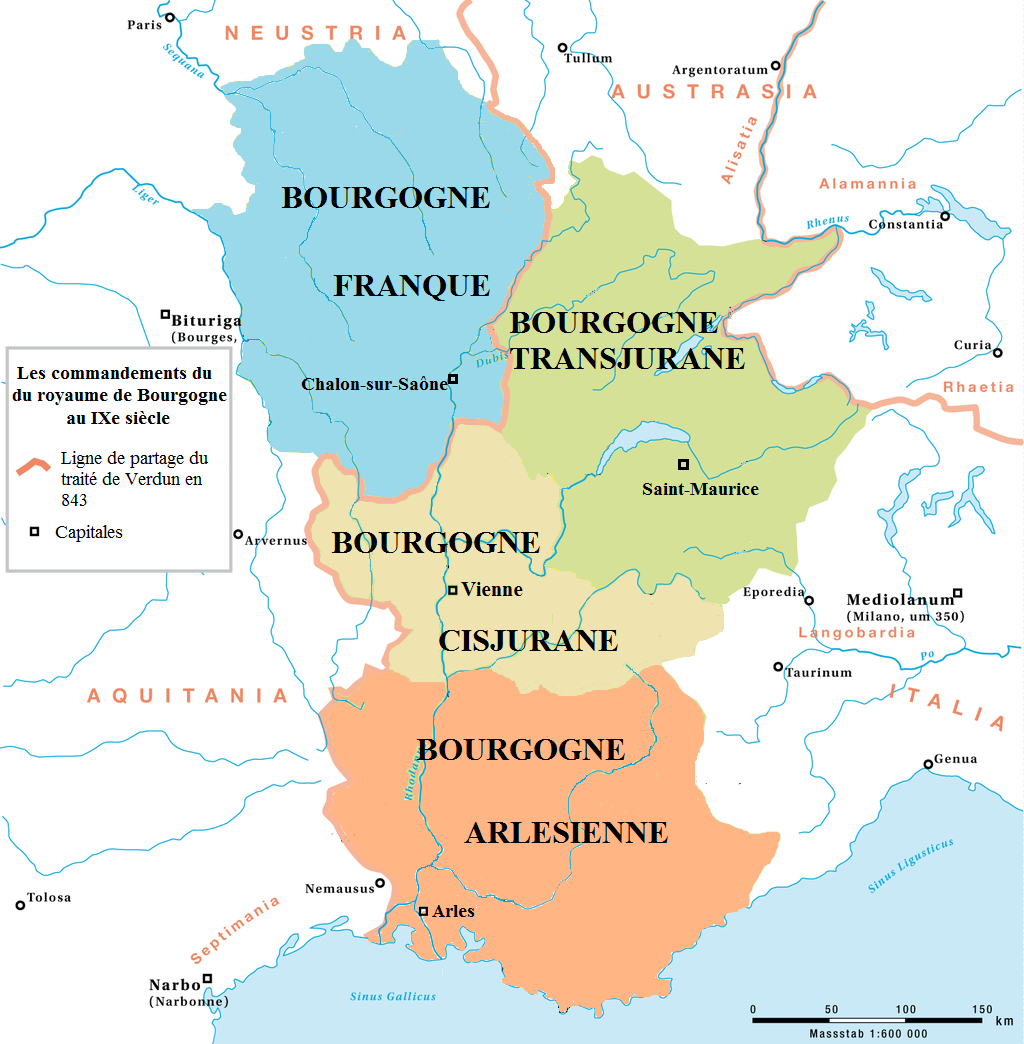
Main historical regions of Burgundy

Kingdom of Burgundy, named after the Germanic tribe of Burgundians, was a name given to various successive kingdoms centered in the historical region of Burgundy during the Middle Ages. The heartland of historical Burgundy correlates with the border area between France and Switzerland, and includes the major modern cities of Geneva and Lyon.

As a political entity, Burgundy existed in a number of forms with different boundaries. During the 9th century, it was divided into Upper and Lower Burgundy and Provence. Two of these entities, the first established around the 6th century and the second around the 11th century, were called the Kingdom of Burgundy. Later successors to this state included the Kingdom of Provence, the Duchy of Burgundy and the County of Burgundy.

== Kingdom of the Burgundians (411–534) ==
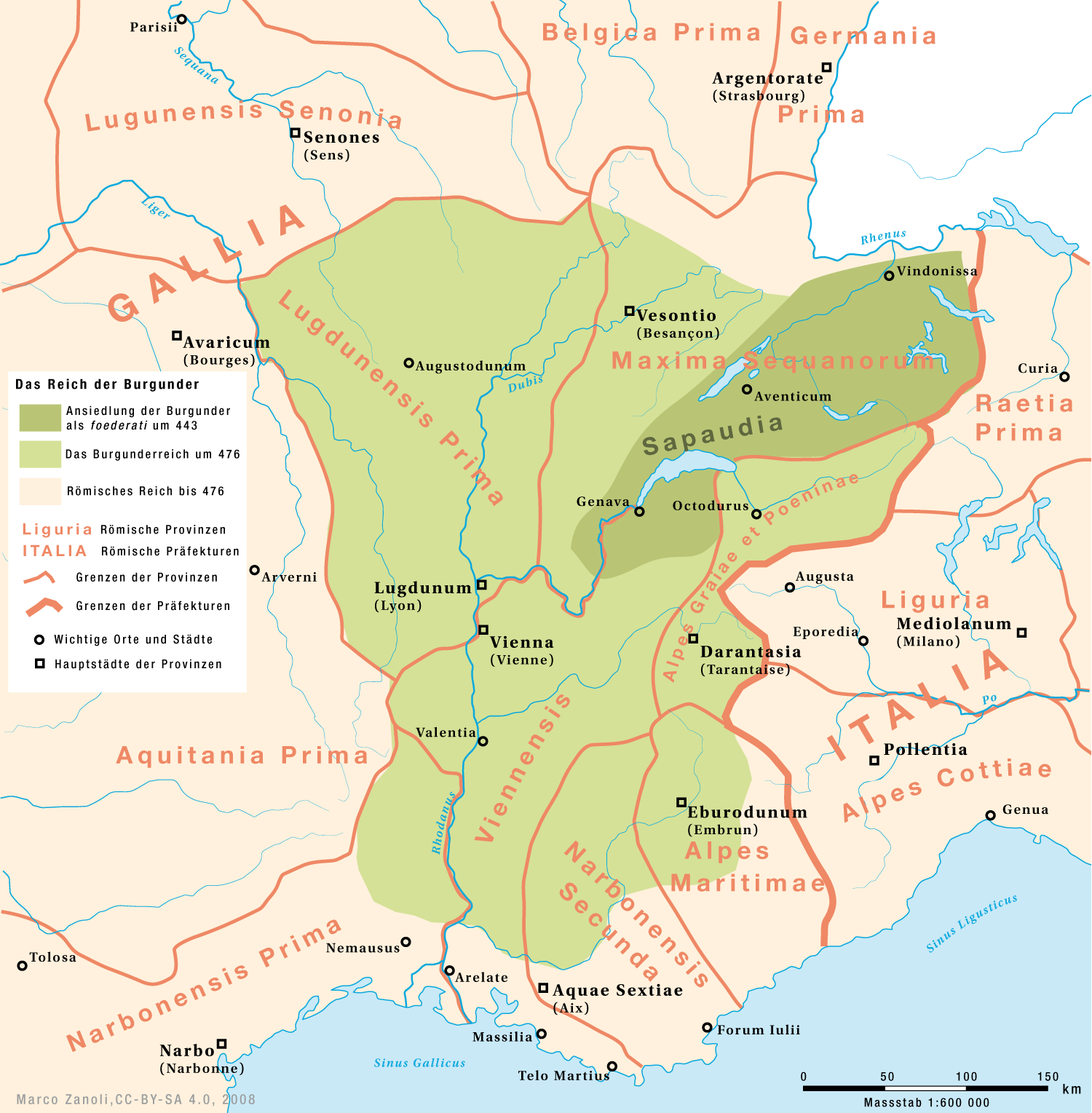
Kingdom of the Burgundians after the settlement in Savoy from 443

Burgundy is named after a Germanic tribe of Burgundians who may have originated on the island of Bornholm, whose name in Old Norse was Burgundarholmr ("Island of the Burgundians"). The Burgundian name may have also been a general Germanic name for "highlanders", as such may have been the name of more than one unrelated tribe. From their first documented location on the Middle Rhine, they migrated south into Roman Gaul and settled in large numbers in the territory of Sapaudia, in what is today western Switzerland and northeastern France, before expanding their domain further south to the Rhône valley, establishing a barbarian kingdom of the Burgundians.

The first documented, though not historically verified, King of the Burgundians was Gjúki (Gebicca), who lived in the late 4th century. In the course of the Crossing of the Rhine in 406, the Burgundians settled as foederati in the Roman province of Germania Secunda along the Middle Rhine. Their situation worsened when, about 430, their king Gunther started several invasions into neighbouring Gallia Belgica, which led to a crushing defeat by joined Roman and Hunnic troops under Flavius Aetius in 436, near Worms (the focus of the mediæval Nibelungenlied poem).

From 443 onwards, the remaining Burgundians settled in the Sapaudia region, again as foederati, in the Roman Maxima Sequanorum province (modern day western Switzerland and northeastern France). Their efforts to enlarge their kingdom down the Rhône river brought them into conflict with the Visigothic Kingdom in the south. After the fall of the Western Roman Empire in 476, king Gundobad allied with the powerful Frank king Clovis I against the threat of Theoderic the Great. He was then able to organize the Burgundian acquisitions based on the Lex Burgundionum, an Early Germanic law code.

The decline of the Kingdom began when they came under attack from their former Frank allies. In 523, the sons of Clovis I campaigned in the Burgundian lands, instigated by their mother Clotilde, whose father king Chilperic II of Burgundy had been killed by Gundobad. In 532, the Burgundians were decisively defeated by the Franks at Autun, whereafter king Godomar was killed and Burgundian lands was annexed by Francia in 534.

== Merovingian Burgundy (534–751) ==
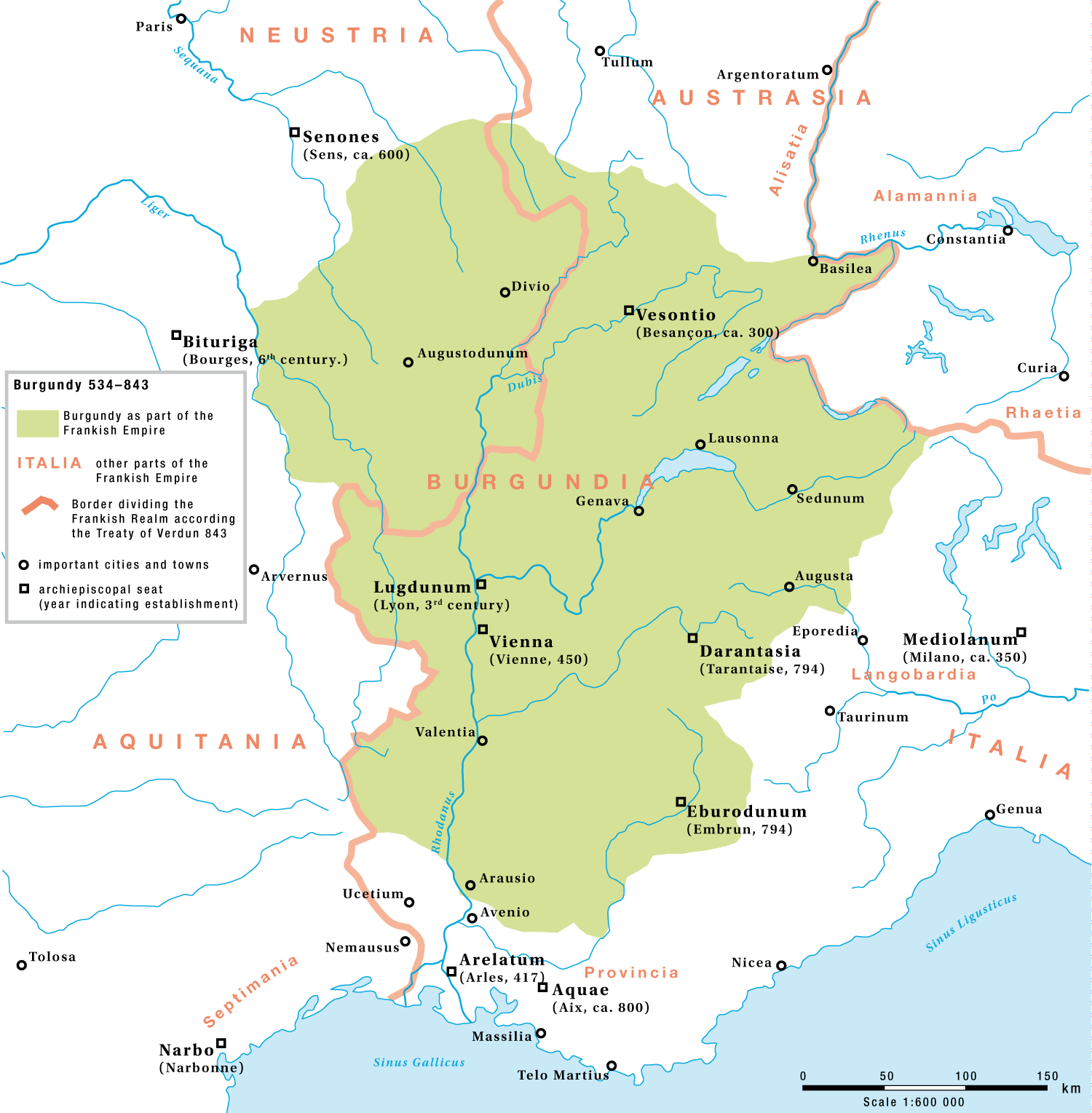
Burgundy as part of the Frankish Empire between 534 and 843, when it was the Kingdom of Burgundy

While there no longer was an independent Burgundian kingdom, Burgundy remained as one of the three main polities that together defined the core Frankish realm, together with Austrasia and Neustria. Between 561 and 592 and between 639 and 737, several rulers of the Frankish Merovingian dynasty used the title of "King of Burgundy".

== Carolingian Burgundy (751–879) ==
Partitions of Charlemagne's empire by his immediate Carolingian heirs led to a short-lived kingdom of Middle Francia, which was created after the 843 Treaty of Verdun. It included lands from the North Sea to southern Italy and was ruled by emperor Lothair I. The northwestern part of the former Burgundian lands was included in the kingdom of West Francia as the Duchy of Burgundy, with its capital in Dijon.

Shortly before his death in 855, Lothair I divided his kingdom among his three sons in three parts: Lotharingia, the Kingdom of Italy, and the regions of Lower Burgundy and Provence. The latter were left to the youngest son, thus known as Charles of Provence. This partition created more conflicts, as older Carolingians who ruled West Francia and East Francia viewed themselves as the true heirs of Middle Francia.

As Charles of Provence was too young to rule, the actual power was held by regent, count Girart II of Vienne, whose wife was the sister-in-law of emperor Lothar I. Girart was a strong regent, defending the kingdom from Vikings, who raided as far as Valence. Charles' uncle, Charles the Bald of West Francia, attempted to intervene in Provence in 861 after receiving an appeal for intervention from the Count of Arles. He invaded Provence as far as Mâcon before being restrained by Hincmar of Rheims.

In 858, Count Girart arranged that, should Charles of Provence die without heirs, the Kingdom of Provence would revert to Charles' older brother Lothair II, who ruled in Lotharingia. When Charles died in 863, his oldest brother Louis II claimed Provence for himself, so the kingdom was divided between the two remaining brothers: Lothair II received the bishoprics of Lyon, Vienne and Grenoble, to be governed by Girart; and Louis II received Arles, Aix-en-provence and Embrun.

After the death of Lothair II, the 870 Treaty of Meerssen allotted the northern part of former Middle Francia to King Louis the German of East Francia and the southern lands of Charles of Provence to King Charles the Bald of West Francia.

== Lower and Upper Burgundy (879–933) ==
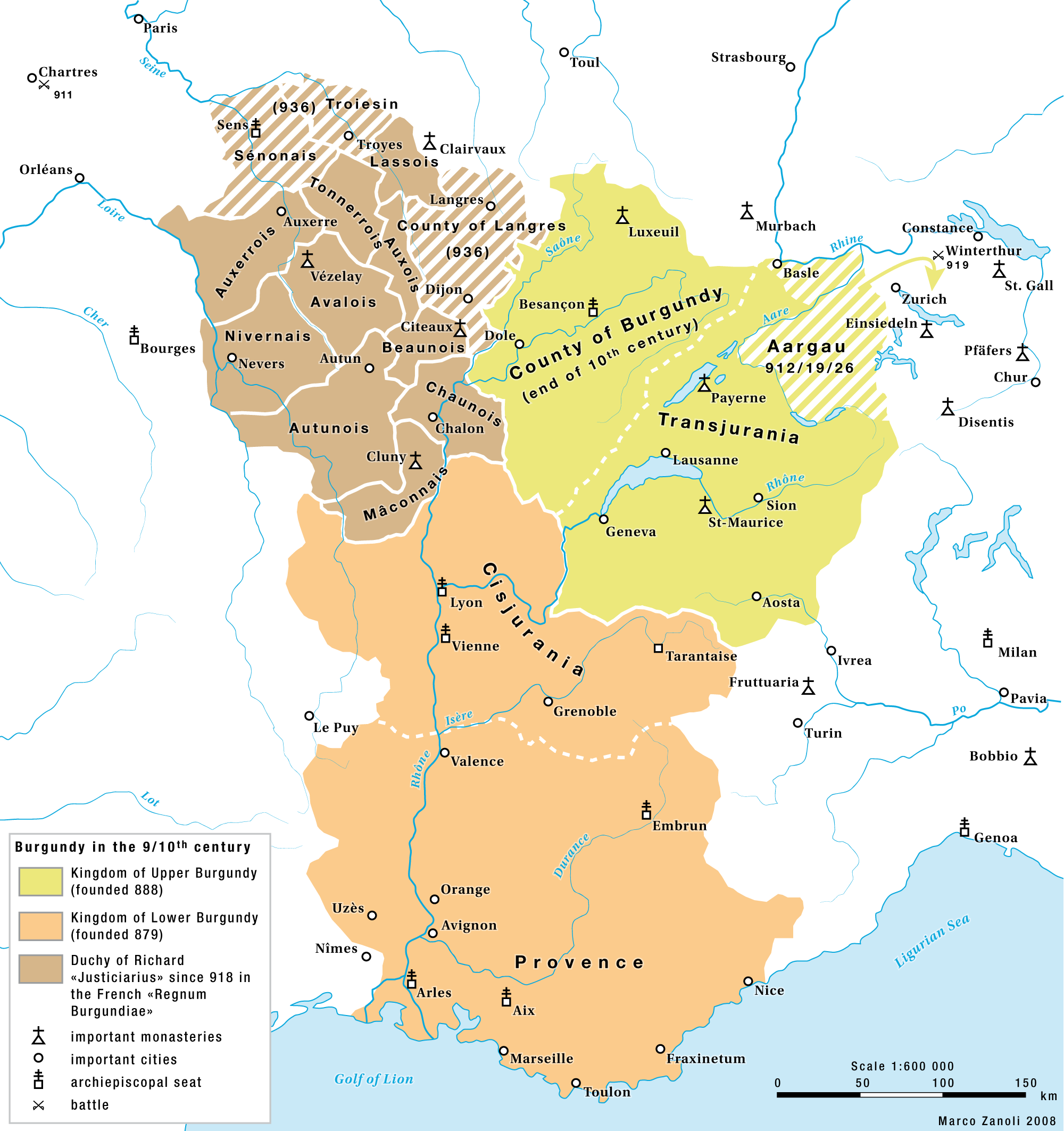
The Kingdoms of Upper and Lower Burgundy between 879 and 933

After the overthrow of Charles the Bald in 877, followed by the death of his son Louis the Stammerer two years later, the Frankish noble Boso of Provence of the Bosonid family proclaimed himself a "King of Burgundy and Provence" at Vienne in 879. Boso's reign lasted until his death in 887. The following year, Rudolph I of Burgundy of the Elder House of Welf carved out his own kingdom of Upper Burgundy, centered on Lake Geneva and including the lands around Besançon that later became the Franche-Comté. Meanwhile, Boso's child son Louis, later known as Louis the Blind, became king of Lower Burgundy in Valence in 890. In 933, Rudolph's son and heir Rudolph II acquired Lower Burgundy and merged the two kingdoms into a single Kingdom of Burgundy.

== Kingdom of Burgundy-Arles (after 933) ==
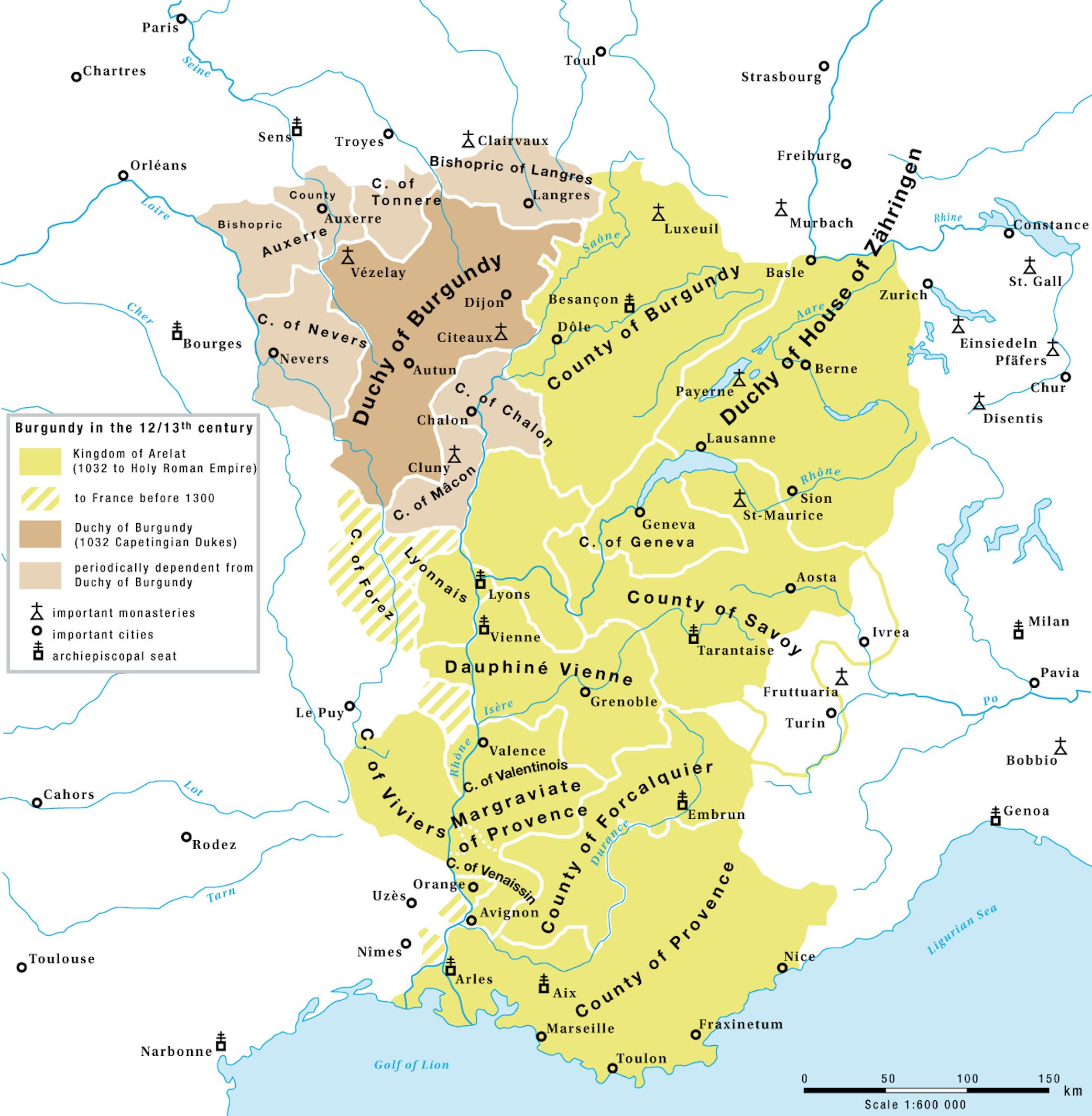
Kingdom of Arles (after 1032)

The Kingdom of Burgundy existed independently until 1032, even though the reality of its monarchs' power did not extend much beyond the region of Lake Geneva. In 1032, it was absorbed into the Holy Roman Empire under Conrad II, who received its crown twice, first at Payerne Abbey in February 1033 and then, after repelling a challenge from Odo II of Blois, at Geneva Cathedral on 1 August 1034. Burgundy thereafter was one of the three kingdoms within the medieval Empire, along with the Kingdom of Germany and the Kingdom of Italy. From the 12th century, it was also known as Kingdom of Arles.

The kingdom gradually fragmented as it was divided among heirs, or territories were lost and acquired through diplomacy and dynastic marriages. Emperors generally neglected its administration, even though Frederick I and Charles IV both performed a Burgundian coronation ceremony in Arles, in 1178 and 1365 respectively. Frederick also convened an imperial diet in Besançon in 1157 that highlighted the importance of the regnum Burgundiae within the Empire.

== Valois revival attempt ==
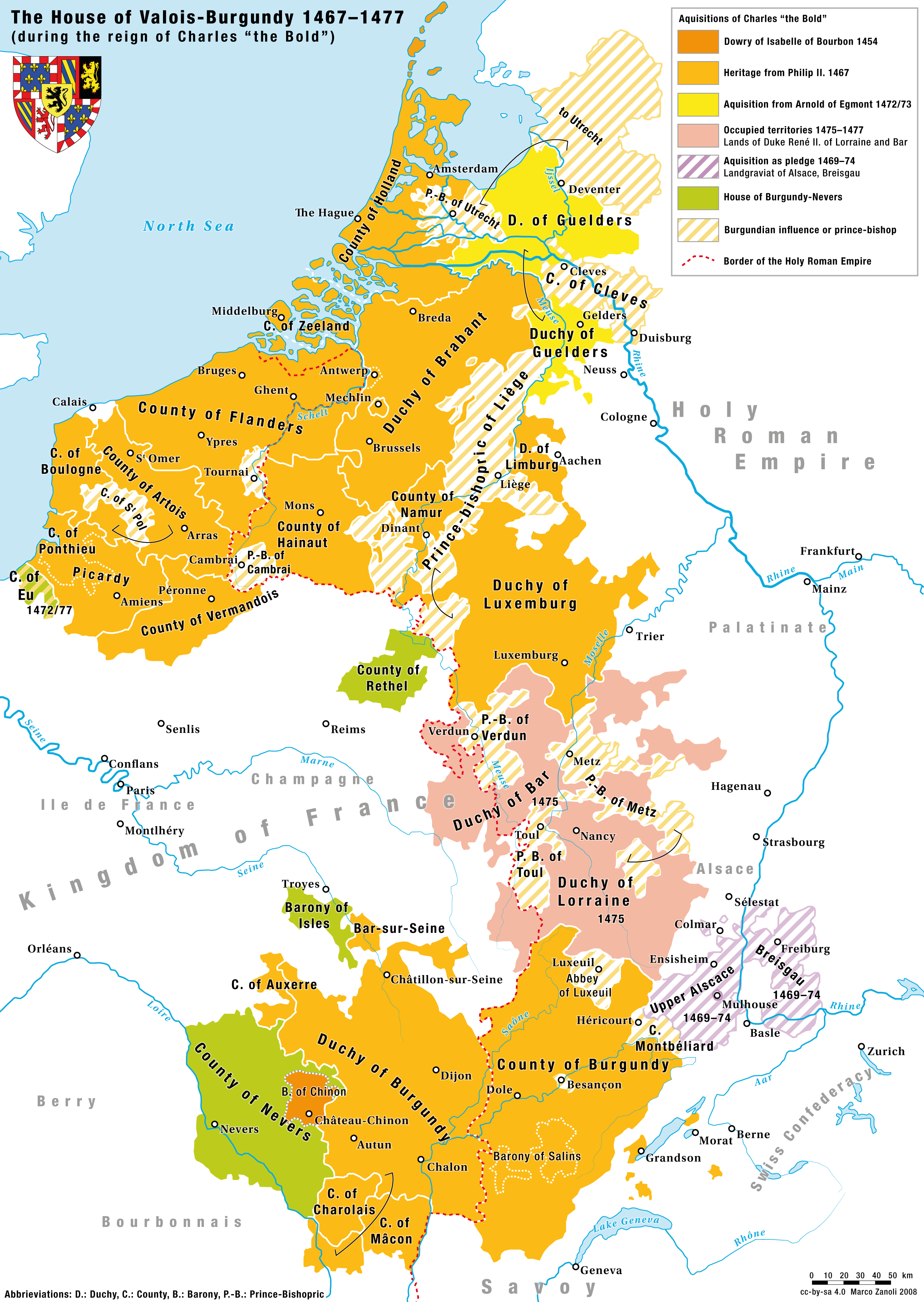
The holdings of the House of Valois-Burgundy during the reign of Charles the Bold in the late 15th century.

In the late 15th century, Charles the Bold, Duke of Burgundy, conceived the project of combining his territories (the Duchy of Burgundy, Franche-Comté and the Burgundian Netherlands) into a revived Kingdom of Burgundy with himself as king. Charles and Emperor Frederick III undertook negotiations that could have led to a coronation ceremony at Trier. The planned ceremony did not take place because the emperor fled during the night in September 1473, due to displeasure with the duke's attitude. The duchy ultimately ended as an independent realm with the defeat and death of Charles at the Battle of Nancy in 1477.

== See also ==
- History of Burgundy
- List of kings of Burgundy
- Burgundian State

== Sources ==
- Cope, Christopher (1987). Phoenix Frustrated: The Lost Kingdom of Burgundy. Constable.
- Davies, Norman (2011). Vanished Kingdoms: The History of Half-Forgotten Europe. Penguin.
- Fournier, Paul (1885). Le royaume d'Arles et de Vienne sous le règne de Frédéric II (1214–1250). Grenoble: G. Dupont. Archived from the original on 2021-01-22.
- Fournier, Paul (1891). Le royaume d'Arles et de Vienne (1138–1378): étude sur la formation territoriale de la France dans l'Ést et le Sudest. Paris: Picard.
- Fournier, Paul (1959). "The Kingdom of Burgundy or Arles from the Eleventh to the Fifteenth Century". In C. W. Previté-Orton (ed.). The Cambridge Medieval History, VIII: The Close of the Middle Ages. Cambridge: Cambridge University Press. pp. 306–31.
- McKitterick, Rosamond (1983). The Frankish Kingdoms Under the Carolingians, 751-987. Harlow: Longman. ISBN 978-0-582-49005-5.
- Poole, Reginald (1911). "Burgundian Notes, I: The Alpine Son-in-Law of Edward the Elder". English Historical Review. 26 (102): 310–17. doi:10.1093/ehr/xxvi.cii.310. Archived from the original on 2021-01-14.
- Poole, Reginald (1912). "Burgundian Notes, II: Cisalpinus and Constantinus". English Historical Review. 27 (106): 299–309. doi:10.1093/ehr/xxvii.cvi.299. Archived from the original on 2021-01-14.
- Poole, Reginald (1913). "Burgundian Notes, III: The Union of the Two Kingdoms of Burgundy". English Historical Review. 28 (109): 106–12.
- Poole, Reginald (1915). "Burgundian Notes, IV: The Supposed Origin of Burgundia Minor". English Historical Review. 30 (117): 51–56. doi:10.1093/ehr/xxx.cxvii.51. Archived from the original on 2021-01-14.
- Poupardin, René (1899). Boson et le royaume de Provence (855–933). Chalon-sur-Saône: E. Bertrand.
- Poupardin, René (1901). Le Royaume de Provence sous les Carolingiens, 855–933. Paris: Émile Bouillon.
- Poupardin, René (1907). Le Royaume de Bourgogne, 888–1038: étude sur les origines du royaume d'Arles. Paris: Champion. Archived from the original on 2021-06-12.
- West, Charles (2023). The Fall of a Carolingian Kingdom: Lotharingia, 855–869. Toronto: University of Toronto Press. ISBN 978-1-4875-4518-5.
- Wilson, Peter (2016). Heart of Europe: A History of the Holy Roman Empire. Cambridge, MA: Belknap Press.
