= Chilperic I of Burgundy =

King of Burgundy (died c. 480)

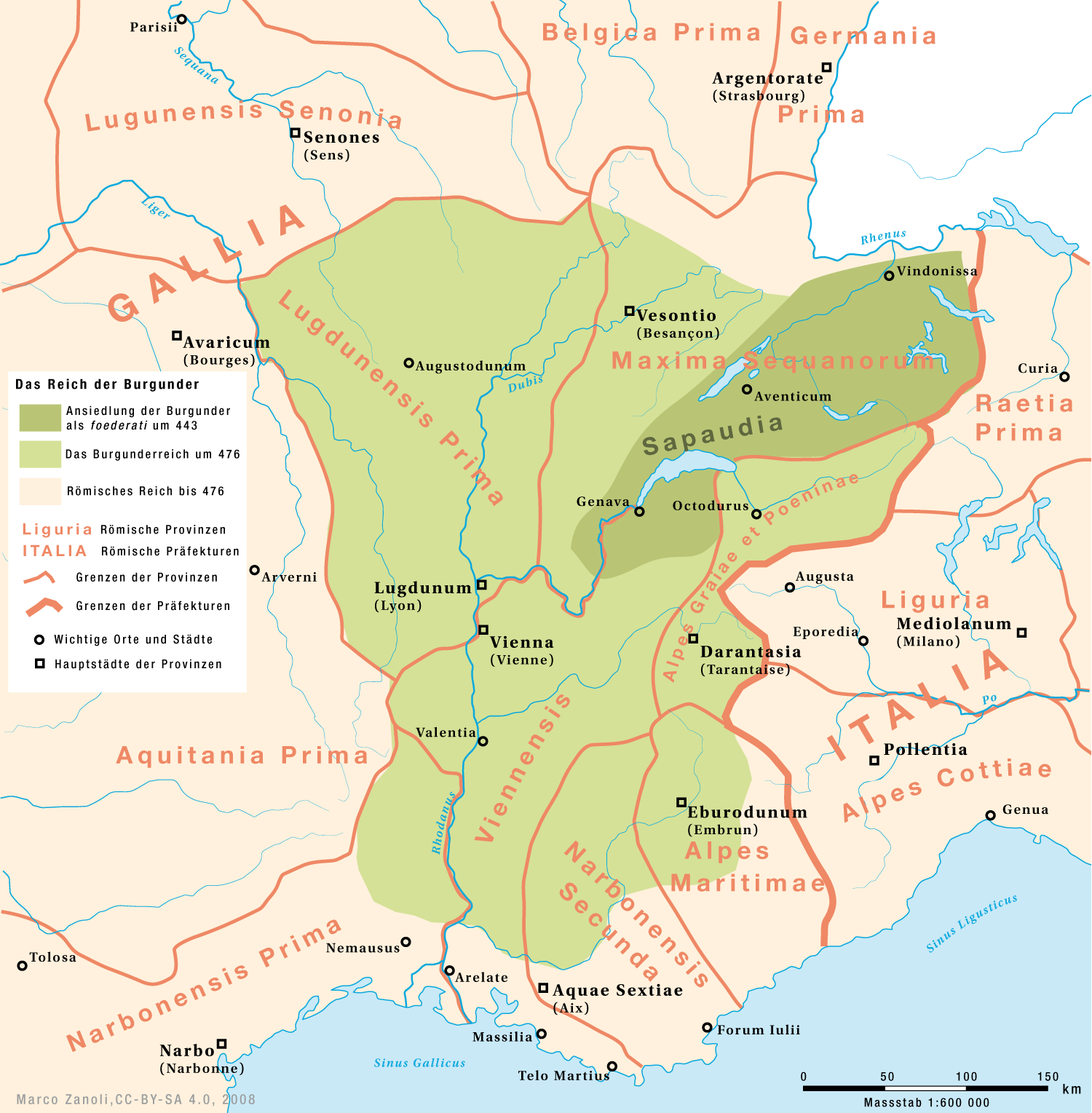
Kingdom of the Burgundians between 443 and 476 AD

Chilperic I (died c. 480) was the King of Burgundy from about 456 until his death. He succeeded his brother Gundioc and co-ruled with his nephews Gundobad and Godegisel.

== History ==
Chilperic I is called king in 457, i.e. during his brother's lifetime. According to Jordanes he was present in Theodoric's campaign against the Sueves in 457. By his brother death around 473, he became the sole ruler. He also assumed his office as Magister militum Galliarum, while Gundioc's son Gundobad took over the title of a Magister militum praesentialis, i.e. an imperial commander. It is unclear to what extent Gundioc's sons Chilperic II, Godomar I, Gundobad and Godegisel were already involved in power at this time. In recent research it is assumed that both Godomar and Chilperich II had died in 476/77 and only Godegisel and Gundobad shared the rule after the death of Chilperic I Chilperic initially continued the fight against the Aquitanian Goths, but stopped it when his nephew Gundobad fell out of grace by the Roman emperor Julius Nepos in 474. After Chilperic's adjustment, Rome had to restore their relations with the Burgundians. After negotiations Julius Nepos dissolved the Foederati treaty and recognised not only the independence of the Burgundians, but also the possession of the Province Viennensis (the Rhone Valley), whose southern part was lost to the Aquitanian Goths in 476.

== Magister militum per Gallias ==
Chilperic succeeded his brother as magister militum per Gallias. Just as Gundioc he was first and foremost an agent of the empire. Evidence of Burgundian conquests aimed at creating a kingdom are missing, although the appointment of Nepos as emperor in 474 did lead to a break with the Romans.

An anecdote about his actions as magister militum is known by Sidonius Apollinaris in which Chilperic judges in favor of Lupicinus on the matter of illegal slavery.

== Marriage ==
Chilperic's marriage to Caretene, which was concluded around 471, remained childless, so that after his death around 480 the empire fell to the two sons of his brother Gundioc.

== Sources ==
- Jordanes, Getica
- Kaiser, Reinhold (2004). Die Burgunder. Universiteit Stuttgart ISBN 3-17-016205-5.
- Wood, Ian N. (2021), "The Making of the 'Burgundian Kingdom", Reti Medievali Journal, 22 (2): 111–140, doi:10.6093/1593-2214/7721, ISSN 1593-2214

Regnal titles
| Preceded by Gondioc | King of the Burgundians; 456–c. 480 | Succeeded by Gundobad, Godegisel |
