= Gondioc =

King of Burgundy from 455 to 473

Coordinates: 47°00′N 4°30′E

King of the Burgundians
- Reign: 437–473
- Predecessor: Gunther
- Successor: Chilperic I
- Born: c. 420
- Died: c. 473
- Spouse: Sister of Ricimer
- Issue: Chilperic II; Gundobad; Godomar I Godegisel
- Father: Gundahar
- Religion: Arianism
- Military career
- Allegiance: Western Roman Empire
- Branch: Roman army
- Service years: 455–473
- Rank: Magister militi per Gallias (463–473)

Gondioc (c. 420 – c. 473), also called Gunderic and Gundowech, was a king of the Burgundians who held a senior command in the Roman army. Under his authority, the foundations were laid for the later Burgundian kingdom. Around 455, he led the Burgundian people together with his brother Chilperic I.

== Origin ==
The origins of Gondioc are unclear. According to the Frankish bishop Gregory of Tours, he was descended from the Gothic king Athanaric († 381), which historian Reinhold Kaiser rejects in light of the name-pattern of the Burgundian list of kings found in the Lex Burgundionum. Some scholars believe that the list implies that he was a close relative, possibly a even a son, of King Gundahar who had been the previous king of the Burgundians.

=== Familial kinship ties ===
Gondioc married a sister of Ricimer, the commander-in-chief of the Roman army in Italy, the Gothic general who effectively ruled the Western Roman Empire. Gundioc's marriage to Ricimer's sister tied his royal house by kinship to the dominant West-Roman military figure. Gondioc had four sons: Godigisel, Gundobad, Chilperic II, and Gundomar.

Wallia	Gibica
mother	Rechila	Gundahar
Rechiar	Ricimer	sister	Gondioc	Chilperic I
Godegisel	Gundobad	Chilperic II	Gundomar

(Family tree)

== Shared kingship with Chilperic ==
Sidonius Apollinaris and Gregory of Tours indicate that Gondioc and his brother Chilperic exercised joint authority over the Burgundian people. Most historians interpret this as a shared dynastic rule rather than a division into separate realms. Similar arrangements were common among several Germanic elites, including the Franks and Goths. The Roman administration appears to have recognized this brotherly structure so long as it remained integrated within Roman governance. Only Gondioc appears in official Roman lists, suggesting he acted publicly as primus inter pares. He commanded the federate troops and later held the Roman title magister per Gallias, while Chilperic oversaw internal administration as the "underking"; meanwhile the Goths and Burgundians "expanded their dominion with the consent of the Gallic senators."

== Burgundian state ==
Gondioc played an important role in shaping the emerging Burgundian state. After the devastating defeat at Worms in 436—during which King Gundahar was killed along with most of the royal family—the Burgundians nevertheless retained their status as foederati. In 443, at the initiative of the Roman general Aetius, they were resettled in Sapaudia, with Geneva as their new center. During Gondioc's reign, Burgundian political structures gradually took form, but evidence of Burgundian conquests aimed at creating a kingdom are missing. Historians can only conclude that Gondioc was an official of the Roman state and that he could exercise his jurisdiction with the help of the Burgundians.

== Military campaign ==
Following their resettlement, the Burgundians could muster only a small force. This was primarily a mobile cavalry contingent tasked with defending the northern flank of the empire. Despite their size, they played a notable military role for Rome. They fought alongside Aetius against Attila, and Hydatius reports that in 456 the Burgundians campaigned with the Aquitanian Goths in Spain against the Suebi. Although Gondioc is not explicitly named as commander, historians generally assume Gundioc and Chilperic led the Burgundian contingent.

=== Revolt against Avitus and Gothic War ===
During the civil war, Gondioc returned to Gaul and supported the new emperor Majorian. In return he received an allotment of land for his people. His role in the subsequent Gothic War (457–458) is uncertain. Some sources (notably Sidonius Apollinaris) suggest he was not fully loyal, maintained contacts with Theodoric II, and supported Gallic rebels who promoted Marcellinus, an influential Roman general, as emperor. After Aegidius and Nepotianus suppressed the rebellion on Majorian's behalf, Burgundian forces defended certain cities (such as Lyon), leading to limited hostilities. Gondioc appears to have acted pragmatically, prioritizing Burgundian interests.

=== Fall of Emperor Majorian ===
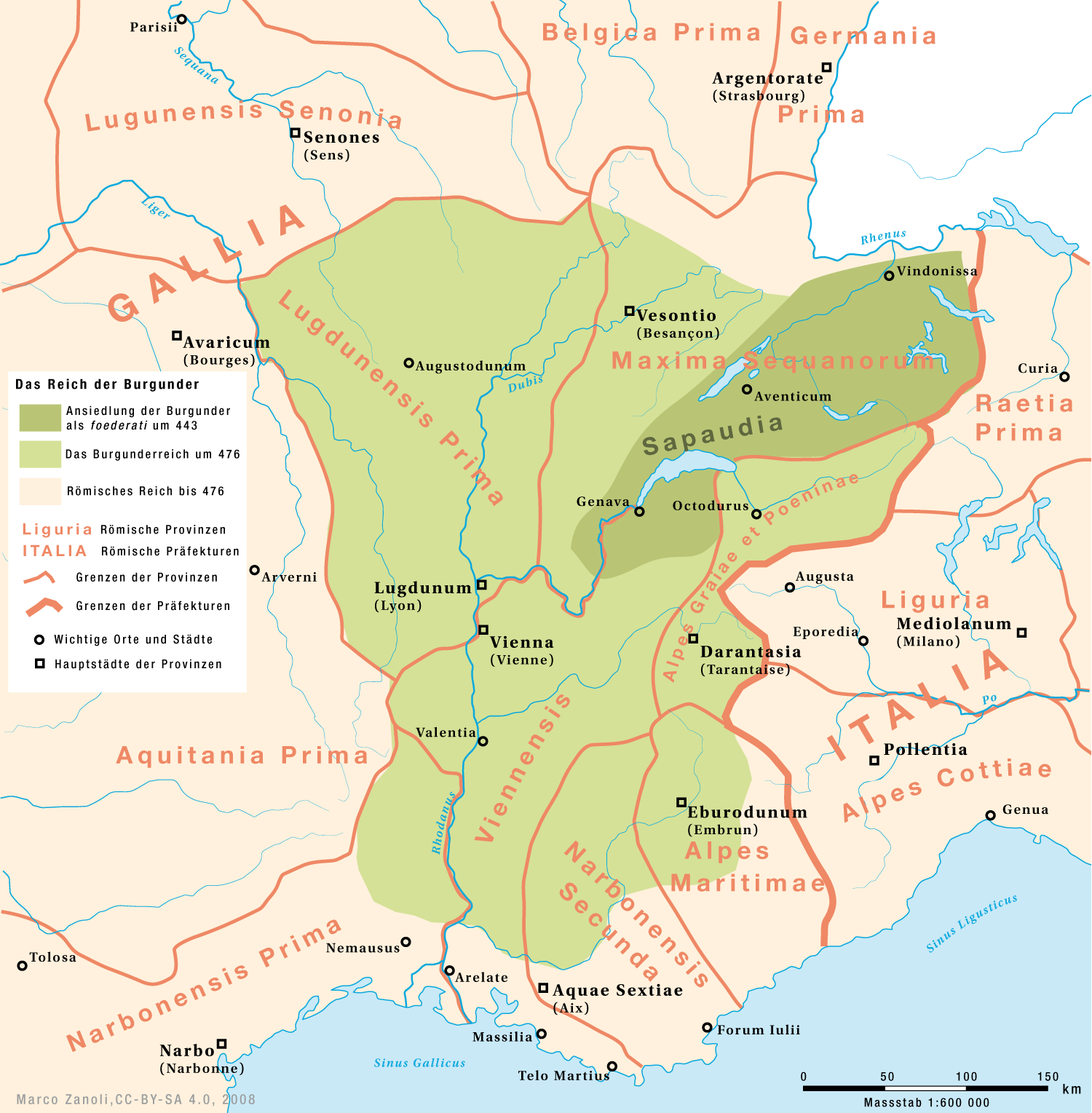
Expansion of the Burgundian territory 443-473

Under Emperor Majorian, Gondioc evolved from a regional foederati leader into a significant Roman ally with an established territorial base. His strength lay in diplomatic agility: he supported Majorian and provided troops but avoided risky undertakings. This enabled him to survive Majorian's downfall and expand his own authority amid the ensuing power vacuum. After Majorian's death, Ricimer dominated Italy, while Gaul fractured into spheres controlled by Aegidius (Soissons), Theodoric II (Aquitaine), and Gondioc north of the Alps.

== Magister militia per Gallias ==
Between 461 and 473, Gondioc shifted from being Ricimer's ally to an autonomous regional ruler. He helped maintain Roman influence in Gaul, and in 463 the emperor appointed him magister militum, commander of the Roman forces in Gaul. His position was strengthened by his kinship with Ricimer. In addition to his traditional role as military commander, Gundioc also appeared to have intervened in ecclesiastical affairs, specifically in a dispute over episcopal succession.

Roman authority in Gaul continued to erode. The uprising of Euric ended Roman power in southern Gaul, and Emperor Anthemius' conflict with Ricimer further diminished imperial influence.

As Roman structures collapsed, various groups competed for control in Gaul. Gondioc fought primarily against the Franks, Alemanni, and the usurper Aegidius. Nevertheless, he expanded Burgundian power northward and northwestward, reaching beyond Langres and near Solothurn by 469. His eldest son Gundobad became commander-in-chief of the Roman army in Italy, appointed to that post in 472 by Emperor Olybrius. Not long before during the same year, Gondioc had killed Emperor Anthemius at Ricimer's request.

== Death ==
Gondioc's death date remains a subject of confusion and debate. Historian Herwig Wolfram places Gondioc's death date around 470, while Kaiser uses a much broader range between 463 and 472, postulating that he probably died before 467. Other sources place Gondioc's death year as late 474, but there is little evidence in the sources to confirm such a date. His brother Chilperic I succeeded him. After Chilperic I's death, Burgundy was divided between the surviving sons of Gundioc, Chilperic II, Gundobad, Godegisel and Godomar. The oldest among them, Gundobad, effectively became king and took up his residence at Lyon, whereas Godegisel resided in Geneva, and the other two likely resided in Vienna and Valence. It is assumed that both Godomar and Chilperic II had died in 476/77 and only Godegisel and Gundobad shared rule after the death of Chilperic I.

== Bibliography ==
=== Primary sources ===
- Hydatius
- Chronica Gallica of 452
- Gregory of Tours
- Sidonius Apollinaris

=== Cited works ===
- Drinkwater, John F. (2007). The Alamanni and Rome, 213–496: Caracalla to Clovis. Oxford and New York: Oxford University Press. ISBN 978-0-19929-568-5.
- Grant, Michael (1978). History of Rome. New York: Scribner. ISBN 0-684-15986-4.
- Gregory of Tours (1974). The History of the Franks. Translated by Lewis Thorpe. New York: Penguin Books. ISBN 978-0-14044-295-3.
- James, Edward (2014). Europe's Barbarians, AD 200–600. London and New York: Routledge. ISBN 978-0-58277-296-0.
- Kaiser, Reinhold (2004). Die Burgunder (in German). Stuttgart: Verlag W. Kohlhammer. ISBN 3-17-016205-5.
- Martindale, J.R. (1980). "Gundiocus". Prosopography of the Later Roman Empire. Vol. II (A.D. 395–527). London; New York: Cambridge University Press. ISBN 0-521-20159-4.
- Nedoma, Robert; Anton, Hans H. (1998). "Gibichungen". In Beck, Heinrich; Geuenich, Dieter; Steuer, Heiko (eds.). Reallexikon der Germanischen Altertumskunde. Vol. 12. New York/Berlin: de Gruyter.
- Thompson, Edward Arthur (1969). The Goths in Spain. Clarendon Press. ISBN 978-0198142713.
- Wood, Ian N. (2021), "The Making of the 'Burgundian Kingdom", Reti Medievali Journal, 22 (2): 111–140, doi:10.6093/1593-2214/7721, ISSN 1593-2214
- Wolfram, Herwig (1997). The Roman Empire and its Germanic Peoples. Berkeley and Los Angeles: University of California Press. ISBN 0-520-08511-6.

Regnal titles
Preceded by Gunther	King of the Burgundians; 437(?)–473	Succeeded by Chilperic I
