= Sigismund of Burgundy =

King of the Burgundians

Saint Sigismund of Burgundy
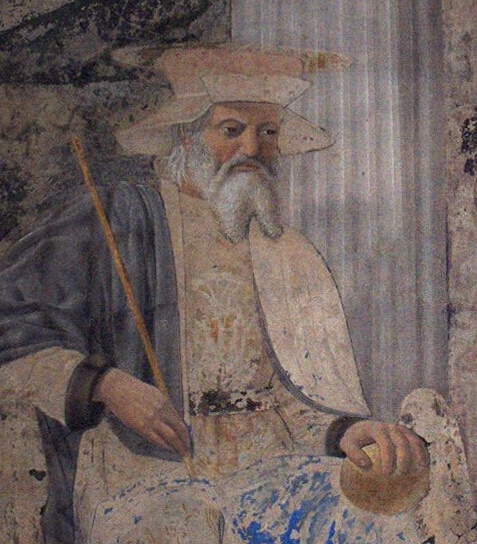
- 1451 fresco by Piero della Francesca
- Born: c. 475
- Died: 524; Aurelianum, Kingdom of the Franks
- Venerated in: Eastern Orthodox Church; Roman Catholic Church
- Feast: 1 May
- Patronage: Czech Republic, monarchs, Germanic peoples, bibliophiles, monasteries

Sigismund (Latin: Sigismundus; died 524 AD) was King of the Burgundians from 516 until his death. He was the son of king Gundobad and Caretene. He succeeded his father in 516. Sigismund and his brother Godomar were defeated in battle by Clovis's sons, and Godomar fled. Sigismund was captured by Chlodomer, King of Orléans, where he was kept as a prisoner. Later he, his wife and his children were executed. Godomar then rallied the Burgundian army and won back his kingdom.

== Life ==
Sigismund was a student of Avitus of Vienne, the Chalcedonian bishop of Vienne who converted Sigismund from the Arian faith of his Burgundian forebears. Sigismund was inspired to found a monastery dedicated to Saint Maurice at Agaune in Valais in 515. The following year he became king of the Burgundians.

== Sigismund's conflict with Bishop Apollinaris ==
Sigismund came into conflict with Apollinaris of Valence over the rules regarding marriage. The king's treasurer, Stephen, was living in flagrant incest. The four bishops of the province ordered him to separate from his companion, but he appealed to Sigismund, who supported his official and exiled the four bishops to Sardinia. They refused to yield, and after some time the king relented, and permitted three of them to return to their Sees, with the exception of Apollinaris, whose defiance had made him particularly obnoxious to the king. He was kept a close prisoner for a year. At last the king, stricken with a severe illness, sent the Queen to request Apollinaris go to the court to restore the monarch to health. On his refusal, the Queen asked for his cloak to place on the sufferer. The request was granted, the king recovered, and Apollinaris was allowed to return to his see.

== Murder of his son ==
According to Gregory of Tours, Sigismund married the daughter of the Ostrogoth King Theodoric. They had a son, Sigeric. The widowed Sigismund later remarried, and his second wife "maltreated and insulted her stepson". When, on a feast day in 517, Sigeric saw his stepmother dressed in his late mother's ceremonial clothes, he called out that she was unworthy to wear them. (Under Burgundian law, his mother's clothes should have gone to his sister, Suavegotha.) The Queen persuaded Sigismund to deal with his son, alleging that Sigeric planned not only to kill his father and seize the throne, but that he also had designs on his grandfather's kingdom in Italy. Sigismund ordered the young man to be taken while drunk and drowned in a well. Then, overcome with remorse, Sigismund retreated to the monastery that he had founded (perhaps on Île Barbe).

== Burgundian War, defeat and death of Sigismund ==
In 523, Clotilde, daughter of Chilperic II of Burgundy, who had been slain by Sigismund's father Gundobad in 493, took revenge for the murder of her father, when she incited her sons against Sigismund, and provoked the Burgundian War, which led to Sigismund's deposition and imprisonment, and his assassination the following year. In 523, the Kingdom of the Burgundians was invaded by the four Frankish kings, Chlodomer, Childebert I, Clotaire I and Theuderic I, children of Frankish king Clovis I and Sigismund's first cousins once removed by Clotilde. Sigismund and his brother Godomar led the Burgundian defence but lost the battle. Godomar fled while Sigismund put on a monk's habit and hid in a cell near his abbey. He was captured by Chlodomer, king of Aurelianum (modern Orléans), beheaded and his body thrown in a well. Sigismund's wife and remaining children were also put to death.

== Aftermath ==
Sigismund was succeeded on the throne by his brother Godomar. Godomar then rallied the Burgundian army and called for aid from his ally, the Ostrogothic king Theodoric the Great. Godomar regained his territory; the garrisons that the Franks had left behind were massacred.

Chlodomer marched with his brother Theuderic I, King of Metz, on Burgundy in 524. Chlodomer was killed at the Battle of Vézeronce, which took place on 25 June 524, reportedly at the hands of Godomar.

== Veneration ==
In 535, Sigismund's remains were recovered from the well on which a chapel was built, around which the village and monastery of Saint-Sigismond later developed, and it was transferred and buried in the monastery at Agaunum. Both of these sites, the place of death and the tomb, became centers of the cult of Sigismund, who was regarded as the patron of those suffering from fever. This devotion spread to Switzerland, France, and Italy. In 675, Dagobert II received the skull of Saint Sigismund from Agaunum and placed it in the abbey he had founded in Rouffach, Alsace. Relics of the saint were also kept in Milan and Imola.

In 1366, Charles IV, Holy Roman Emperor, transferred Sigismund's relics from Agaunum to Prague and placed them in the cathedral church, hence he has become a patron saint of the Kingdom of Bohemia, now Czech Republic. Charles IV built an altar in honor of Sigismund and also commissioned a reliquary for his head, which contradicts the claim that the head had been transferred to Rouffach by Dagobert II. It is possible that only a part of it was brought there.

The emperor gave the saint's name to one of his sons, the later King Sigismund of Hungary (who also became decades later King of Bohemia and Holy Roman Emperor). In 1424, Sigismund of Hungary constructed a church in the honor of Saint Sigismund in the City of Buda. The same year, King Sigismund took the relics of Saint Sigismund from Prague and sent them to the Hungarian city of Varad to protect them from the Hussites.

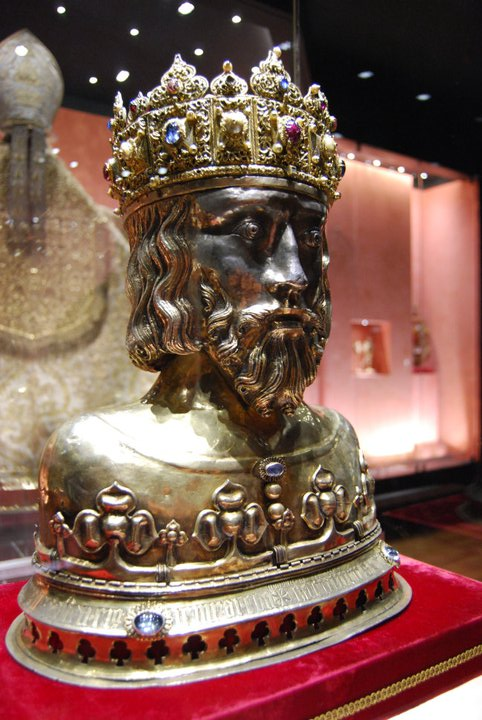
Reliquary of Saint Sigismund in Płock Cathedral (2011)

The relics and cult of Saint Sigismund also appeared in the cathedral church in Płock before the 13th century. It is unclear how they came to be there. They may have been brought by Bishop Werner, who in 1166, on the order of Duke Bolesław IV the Curly, traveled to Emperor Frederick Barbarossa in an attempt to persuade him and prevent a planned military campaign against Poland. The mission was successful, and the bishop received a gift of Saint Henry’s relics. On his return, near the border of Meissen and Poland, he built a church dedicated to Saint Henry, where he consecrated an altar to both Saint Henry and Saint Sigismund. So it is possible that he also carried relics of Sigismund with him.

An exceptionally rich reliquary bust is associated with the cult of Sigismund in Płock. It was commissioned by the Polish king Casimir the Great between 1350 and 1356 and created in a Kraków workshop. The facial features of the bust closely resemble those of Casimir the Great as depicted on his tomb in Wawel Cathedral, thus representing the founder himself. In 1370, after falling from his horse during a hunt, the king vowed to God and Saint Sigismund to rebuild the ruined cathedral in Płock. Although the king died shortly thereafter, his will was fulfilled by his chaplain, Jan of Skrzynno, who donated the royal reliquary bust to the cathedral. It was adorned with a 13th-century Piast crown and served as a reliquary of the saint. Looted by the Germans during World War II, it was returned to the Płock Cathedral in 1980.

A Catalan legend, dating at least to the XVI century, has it that as a young man Sigismund travelled to Hispania and once there he heard about the hermits of the Montseny mountain and decided to join them. As soon as he arrived at the mountain he found a hermit who initially welcomed him in his cave, but Sigismund, looking for a more secluded and solitary place, settled in a cave and lived there for two years dedicated to prayer and the interior life, feeding on herbs and other wild products. A place where his father came to look for him to integrate him into the government of his kingdom. This cave later became a sanctuary where hermits lived and pilgrims gathered to venerate the king saint, a tradition that still continues to this day each 1st of May.

== Family and issue ==
In 494, he married Ostrogotha, the illegitimate daughter of Theodoric the Great and a concubine, as a part of Theodoric's negotiation for an alliance with Sigismund and the Burgundians. They had the following issue:

- Sigeric (494/95 – 517), murdered by his own father
- Suavegotha (495/96 – ?), married to Theuderic I, son of Clovis I
- Daughter, name unknown

== See also ==
- Statues of Saints Norbert, Wenceslaus and Sigismund

== Bibliography ==
- Askanas, Kazimierz (1988). "Płocka herma fundacji Kazimierza Wielkiego" (PDF). Notatki Płockie. 33.
- Rojewski, Andrzej (1967). "Zarys kultu liturgicznego św. Zygmunta w Polsce w okresie przedtrydenckim". Roczniki Teologiczno-Kanoniczne. XIV (4).

Regnal titles
Preceded by Gundobad	King of Burgundy; 516–523	Succeeded by Godomar
