= Clotilde =

Queen of the Franks (c. 474 – 545)

Saint Clotilde
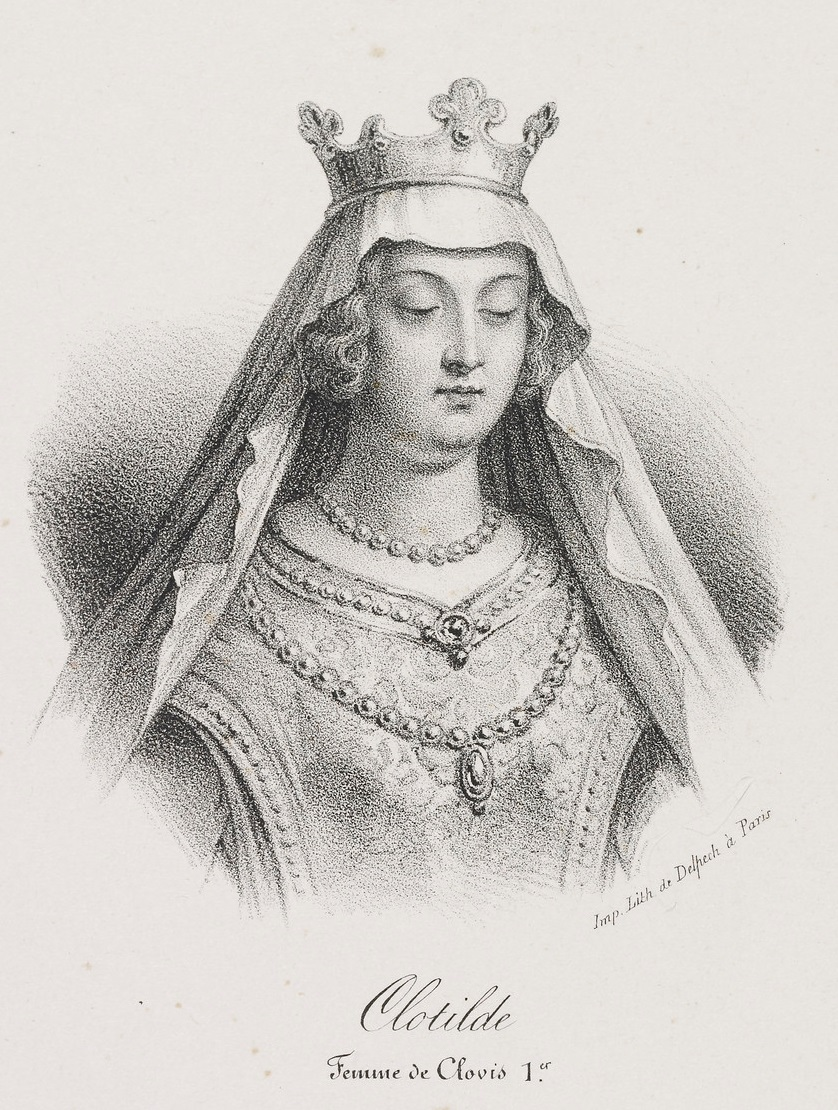
- A lithograph of Saint Clotilde

Queen consort of the Franks Confessor
- Born: c. 474; Lyon, Burgundy
- Died: 545; Aged 70–71; Tours, Francia
- Venerated in: Catholic Church, Eastern Orthodox Church, Lutheranism
- Canonized: Pre-Congregation
- Feast: June 3 (June 4 in France)
- Attributes: as a praying queen and as a nun, with a crown on her head or beside her
- Patronage: brides, adopted children, parents, exiles, notaries, widows, the lame

Clotilde (c. 474 – 3 June 545 in Burgundy, France) (also known as Clotilda (Fr.), Chlothilde (Ger.) Chlothieldis, Chlotichilda, Clodechildis, Croctild, Crote-hild, Hlotild, Rhotild, and many other forms) is a Roman Catholic saint. As the consort of the Merovingian king Clovis I, the first king of the Franks, she was a Queen of the Franks. She convinced Clovis to convert to Christianity; the Franks, due to her influence, remained Catholics for centuries. Clotilde is the patron saint of the lame in Normandy and that of Les Andelys, and she has been "invoked against sudden death and iniquitous husbands." Her feast day is June 3.

Since the 6th century, according to hagiographer David Hugh Farmer, the marriage of Clovis and Clotilde has been "the theme of epic narratives, in which the original facts were materially altered". Belgian historian Godefroid Kurth writes that Clotilde's story fascinated later generations because it was "the centerpiece of a struggle between the old Catholic, Roman population against the Arianism of the Germanic tribes," although there is no evidence that Clovis was an Arian sympathizer before his marriage and conversion to Catholicism.

Clotilde is represented as a praying queen and as a nun. She built churches, monasteries, and convents, including the Basilica of the Holy Apostles, originally dedicated to Saints Peter and Paul. After the death of Saint Genevieve, the patron saint of Paris, Clovis and Clothilde built a mausoleum for her at the church and rededicated it to her.

Political and violent intrigue surrounded Clotilde's family for most of her life. Kurth writes that she was "saddened by cruel trials." After Clovis died, she spent the rest of her life near the tomb of Saint Martin of Tours, "led a devout life," became "totally detached from politics and power-struggles except through prayer", and gave all her possessions to the poor.

== Biography ==
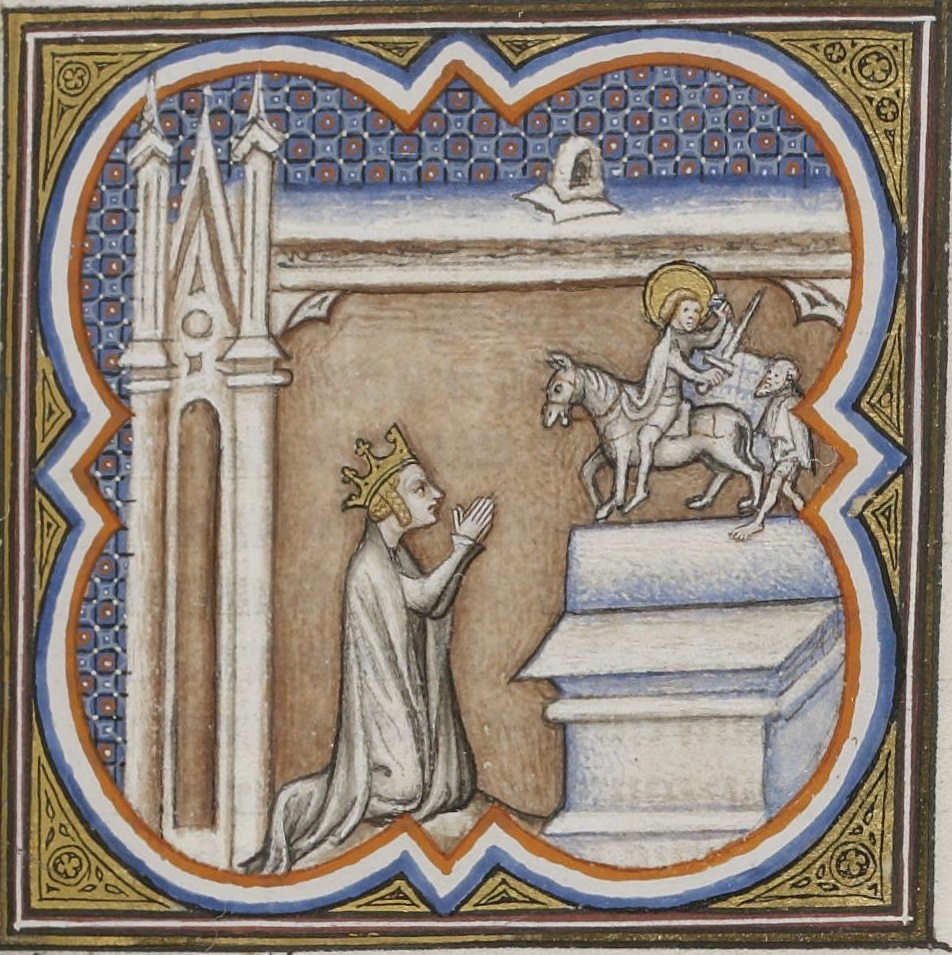
St Clotilde at prayer (illuminated initial)

=== Early life ===
Clotilde, born c. 474, was from Burgundy. According to her hagiographer Alban Butler, the only source for her biography was a pre–8th-century account by a monk from Saint-Denis, which was edited by Bruno Krusch before the 10th century. Her history has also been pieced together from the writings of Gregory of Tours and Fredegarius and from certain hagiographies. Butler states that the most reliable source on Clotilde's life is Belgian historian Godefroid Kurth, but David Hugh Farmer calls Gregory's hagiography of Clotilde "the principal source for her life" and said that a later hagiography "celebrated her as the saintly ancestor of the French kings." Her history also appears in French hagiographies, but most of them were written before Kurth's.

Clotilde's grandfather was Gondioc, who had four sons: her father Chilperic II of Burgundy, Gundobad, Gondemar, and Godegisel. After Gondioc's death, Burgundy was divided up among them, but Gundobad gained power over Burgundy when he murdered his brothers. Gundobad also killed Clotide's brothers and her mother Carétène, who might have converted Chilperic to Christianity and was called "a remarkable woman" by Sidonius Apollinaris and Venantius Fortunatus. (Note: As scholar JoAnne McNamara put it, Clothild and her mother "set a pattern for a chain of Catholic female missionaries to the courts of the pagan and Arian kings they married".)

Clotilde and her sister, Sedeleuba (or Chrona), who later became a nun and founded the church of Saint-Victor in Geneva, were raised at the court of Gundobad. They were educated as Catholics, even though Gundobad, like most of the Burgundian kings, were Arians. (Note: Gundobad's son was later converted to Catholicism, although he was killed by Clotilde's sons.) According to hagiographer Sabine Baring-Gould, Clotilde "grew up full of piety and tenderness to sufferers."

=== Later life and marriage ===
In 492 or 493, shortly after her parents were murdered, Clotilde was wed to Clovis I, the first king of the Franks. Farmer writes that Clovis was "impressed by her beauty and wisdom." Clotilde exercised influence over her husband. Although few actual historical details have been recorded about her during Clovis's lifetime, or about their marriage, she might have been involved with his intervention into the quarrel among the Burgundian kings at the time and Clovis's support of Gondobad.

Clotilde actively encouraged Clovis to convert to Catholicism. He allowed the baptism of their oldest son, Ingomir, who died in infancy, and of their next son, Chlodomer, but he blamed their oldest child's death on Clotilde's faith and resisted her attempts to convert him. Clodomir also became ill but recovered. Clovis and Clotilde had five children in all: four sons—Ingomir, Chlodomer, Childebert, and Clotaire, who all became kings—and one daughter, Clotilde, named after her mother. The elder Clotilde's vita describes her daughter's life, who married a Visigothic man named Amalaric. The younger Clotilde unsuccessfully tried to convert Amalaric to Catholicism and was "cruelly treated" by him.

Clovis was baptized by St. Remigius at Reims in 496, along with 3,000 of the Frankish people, after a battle with the Alemanni. Clovis's army was losing, but he appealed to his wife's God for help, promising that if he won he would accept the Christian faith. According to tradition, while Clotilde was in prayer and as Clovis began to win the battle, an angel brought her three white lilies; Clovis later substituted lilies for the three frogs in the insignia on his battle shield. Baring-Gould considers Clovis's conversion sincere, not due to political considerations; he disputes the assertion that Clotilde influenced Clovis to fight this or other wars to avenge her family's death. Nor do Clovis's subsequent military achievements against the Burgundians and Visigoths seem to have been associated with Clotilde.

Clovis died in 511; Clotilde buried him at the Basilica of the Holy Apostles, later the Church of Sainte-Geneviève. Genevieve might have been the first to suggest that Clovis build a church honouring Saint Peter and Saint Paul, which he built in deference to Clotilde's wishes; she completed the church after his death.

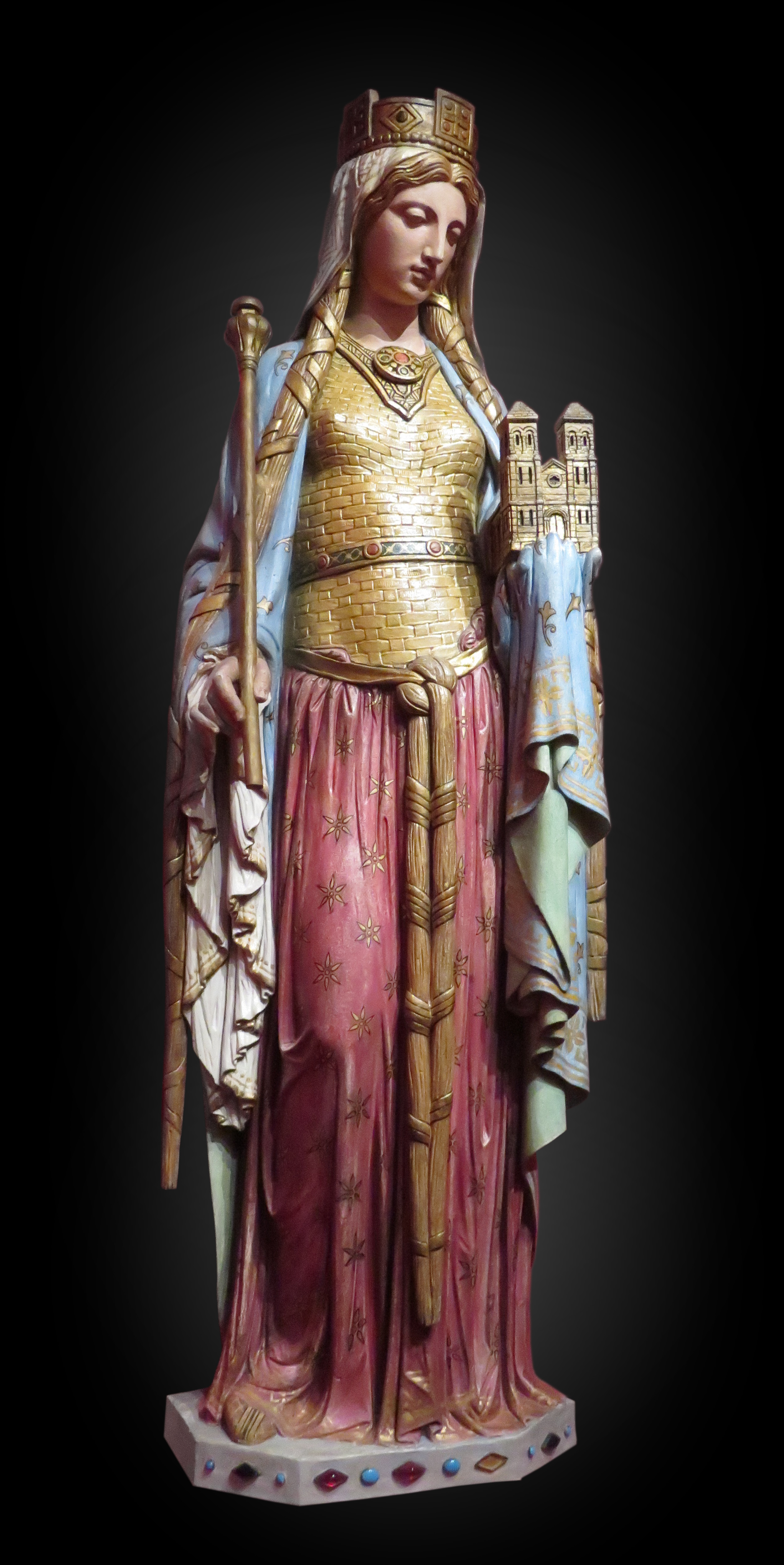
Statue of Saint Clotilde by Eugène Guillaume and Alexandre-Dominique Denuelle

=== Post-marriage and death ===
According to Kurth in The Catholic Encyclopedia, an epic about the Franks accuses Clotilde of inciting her son Chlodomer to start a war with his cousin, Sigismund of Burgundy, to avenge the deaths of her parents. Godefroid doubts the story is true, considers it a defamation against Clotilde, and states that she arranged a truce between Clovis and Gondebad, Sigismund's father. Butler agrees, stating that sources such as the writings of Gregory of Tours have been disproven, which has "vindicated the queen from charges of ferocity and vindictiveness, little in keeping with her saintly character." (Note: Dunbar takes the opposite view (see pp. 192-`93), although she states that Clotilde led a virtuous life in her later years.)

According to Butler, Chlodomer captured and killed Sigismund as well as his wife and children, but was then killed by Sigismund's brother. Clotilde adopted her three young grandsons, but was induced to send them to her other sons, who had the two elder boys killed. The youngest, Clodoald, was saved and later became a monk in Paris, at the monastery in Nogent-sur-Marne, which was later renamed in his honour. According to Agnes B.C. Dunbar, Clotilde's son-in-law Amalaric at one point sent a bloodstained veil to her brothers; her brother Childebert retaliated against him, pillaging his towns, and rescued his sister from Amalaric, but the younger Clotilde died on the way to Paris.

After the deaths of Clovis and her grandchildren, Clotilde left Paris and moved to Tours, where she spent most of her time near the tomb of Saint Martin of Tours and became closely associated with the diocese of Tours. Dunbar writes that Clotilde and Clovis were devoted to Saint Martin. As Farmer reports, "thenceforward she led a devout life," becoming "totally detached from politics and power-struggles except through prayer". Dunbar states that she "prayed and fasted and wept, and gave all she had to the poor."

Despite her apparent withdrawal from politics, Farmer states that Clotilde continued to exert political influence in "the violent Merovingian world," mostly through her sons. Gregory of Tours wrote that her prayers delayed a war between her two surviving sons; as Butler put it, "The very next day, as the armies were about to engage, there arose a tempest that all military operations had to be abandoned." A month later, on June 3, 545, Clotilde died at Tours. She was buried at the Church of the Holy Apostles, at the feet of St. Genevieve and beside Clovis and her older children. She had been a widow for 34 years.

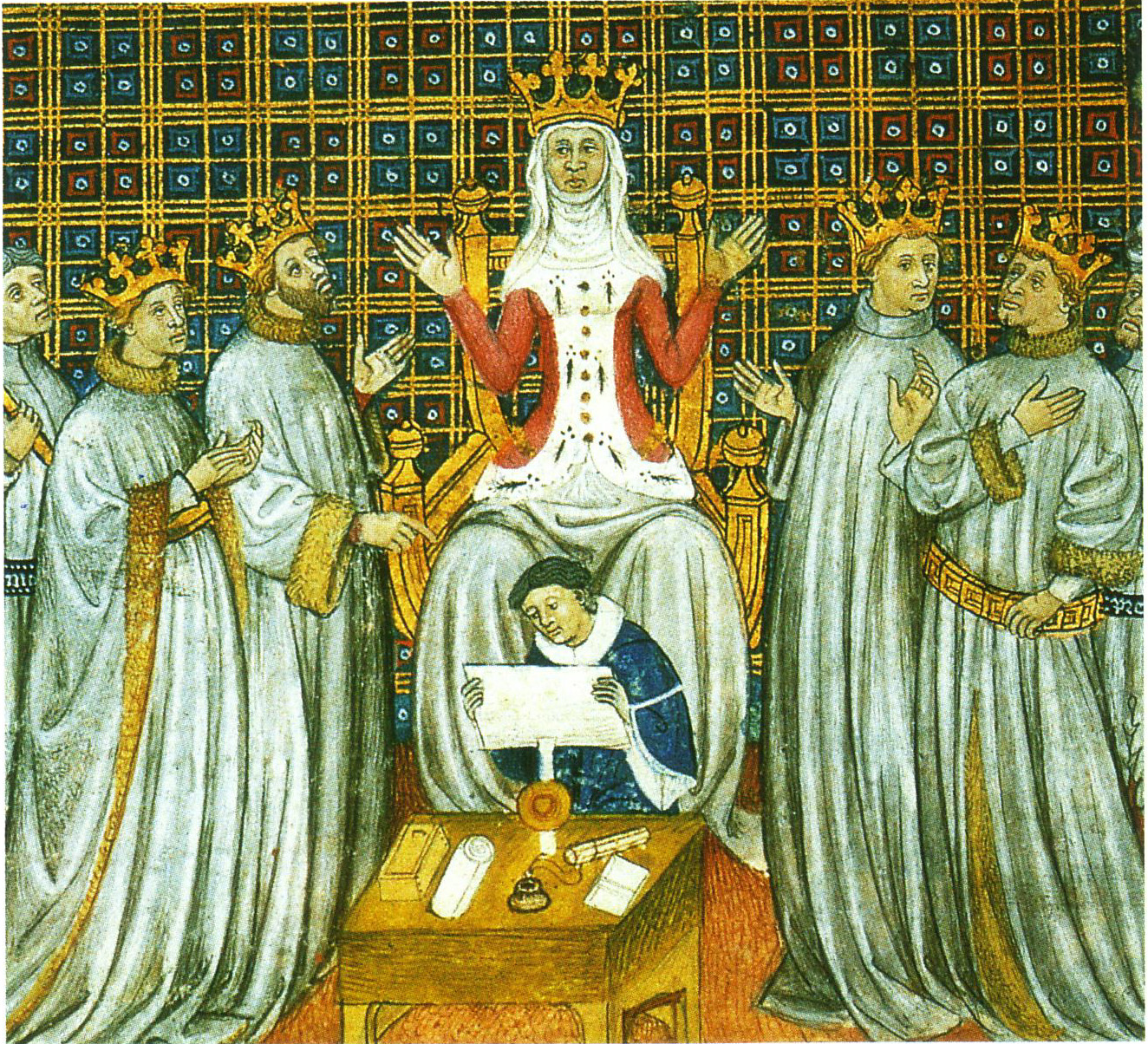
Clotilde and her sons, Grandes Chroniques de Saint-Denis

== Legacy ==
Clotilde founded a convent for young noble girls in Les Andelys, where the Collegiate Church of Notre-Dame des Andelys [fr] now stands. According to a story related on the Les Andelys tourist office website, a miracle occurred during the convent's construction. One day, the workers complained about the heat and their thirst; in response, Clotilde prayed, and water from a nearby fountain "had the power and the taste of wine for the workers." The space in front of the fountain was larger than it currently is, providing enough room for pilgrims who came for healing, which reinforced people's belief in its power. The spring has become known for healing skin diseases.

At a royal Merovingian villa in Chelles, Seine-et-Marne, she had a small chapel dedicated to Saint George c. 511; a century and a half later, Saint Balthild would build Chelles Abbey on the chapel's ruins. The monastery was wealthy until modern times and was for many years "a great place of resort and education for English princesses" who descended from Clovis and Clotilde.

Clotilde also built churches reportedly at Rouen and Lyon.

Clotilde has been depicted in art over the centuries presiding over the baptism of Clovis or as a supplicant at St. Martin's shrine. The church dedicated to her in Andelys contains a "fine 16th-century stained-glass window devoted to her life." The Bedford Hours missal contains a painting of Clotilde, probably by Jan Van Eyck, which Dunbar describes as "a beautiful and brilliant representation of the granting of the lilies to Clovis." Clotilde's relics survived the French Revolution and since 1997 have been stored at the Church of Saint Louis of France in Paris. In 1857, a "grand new church" was founded in her honour in Paris.

== In Art ==
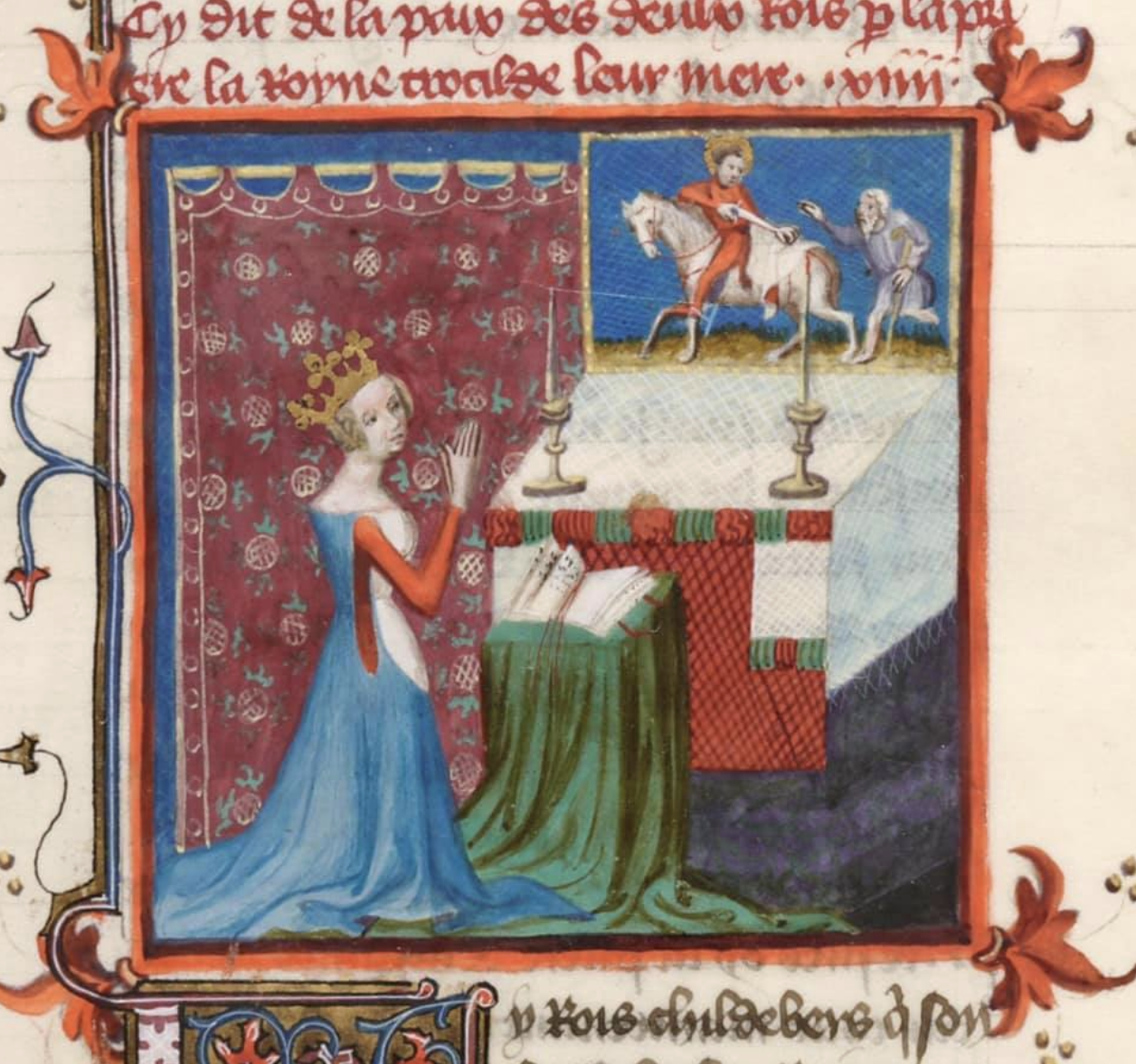
Clotilde invoking Saint Martin, Les Grandes Chroniques de France (15th c.)

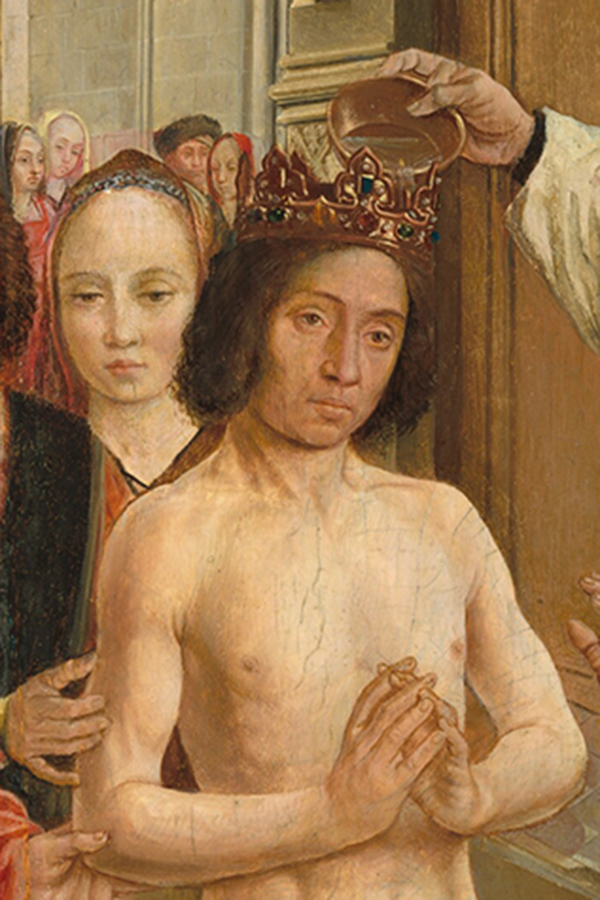
Master of Saint Giles, The Baptism of Clovis I (1500)

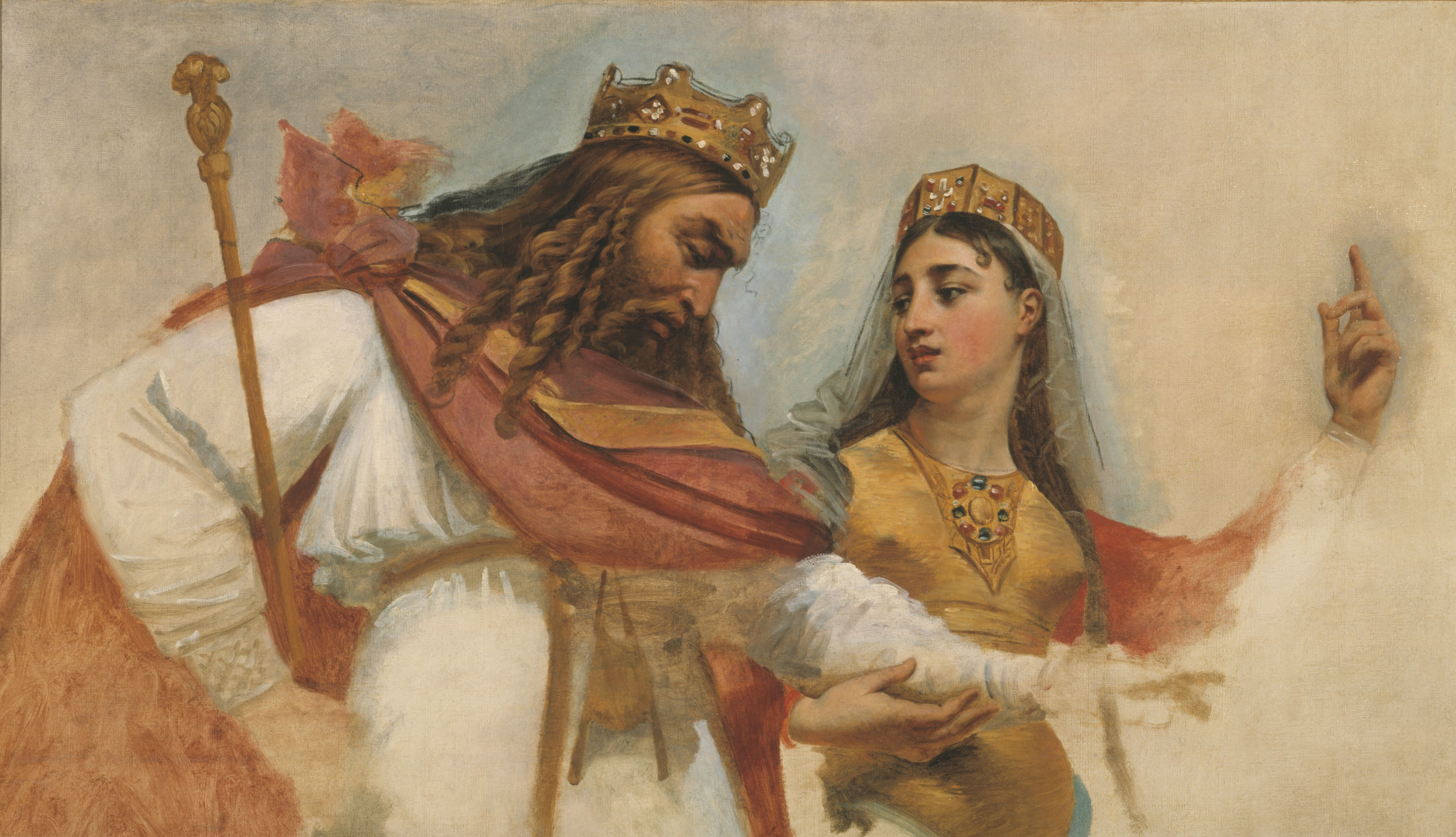
Antoine-Jean Gros, Apotheosis of Saint Genevieve (1811-34) detail

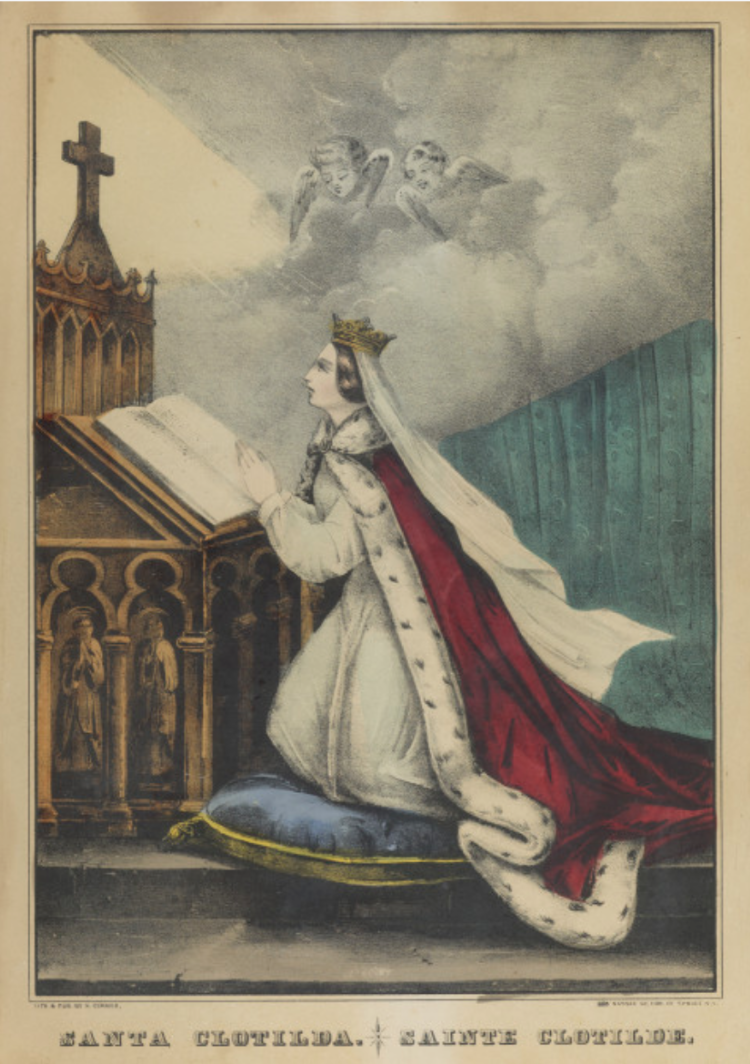
Nathaniel Currier, Saint Clothilde (1850)

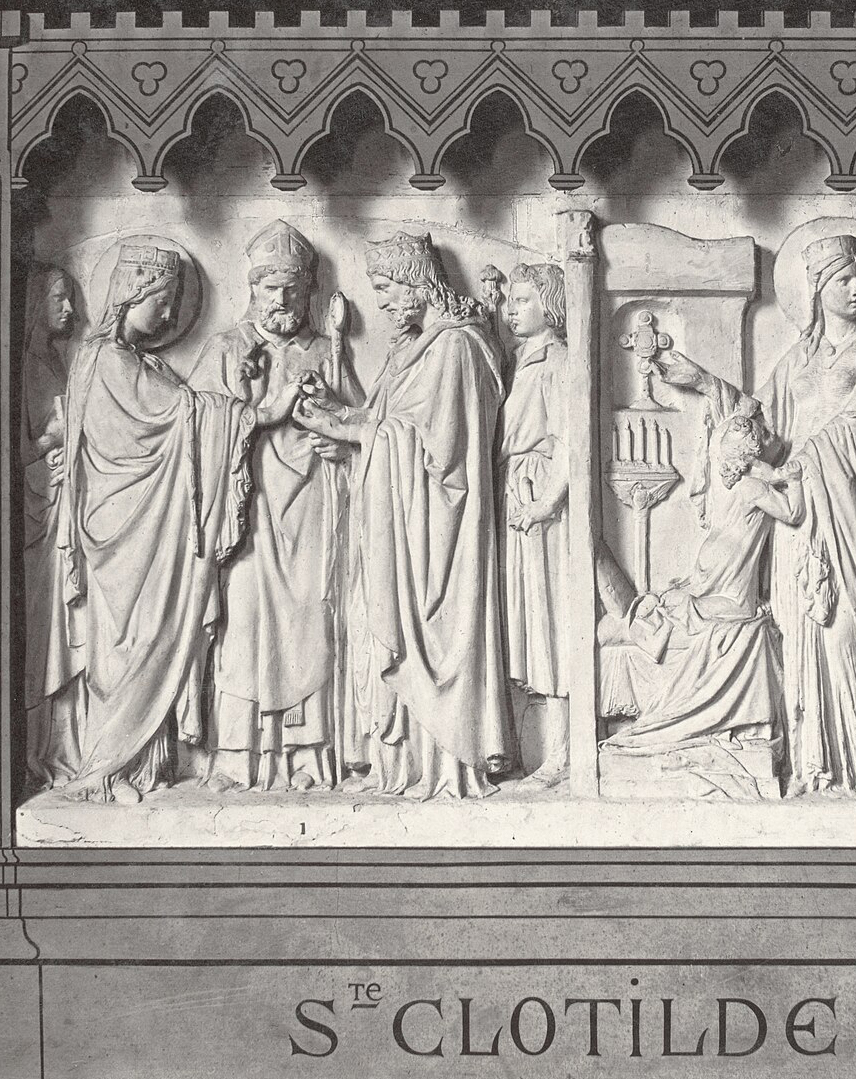
Charles Marville, Eglise Sainte Clotilde (1854)

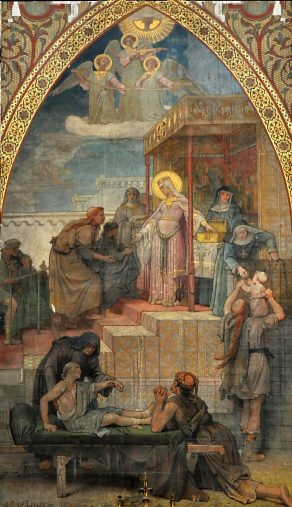
Désiré François Laugée, Sainte-Clotilde aiding the poor (1856)

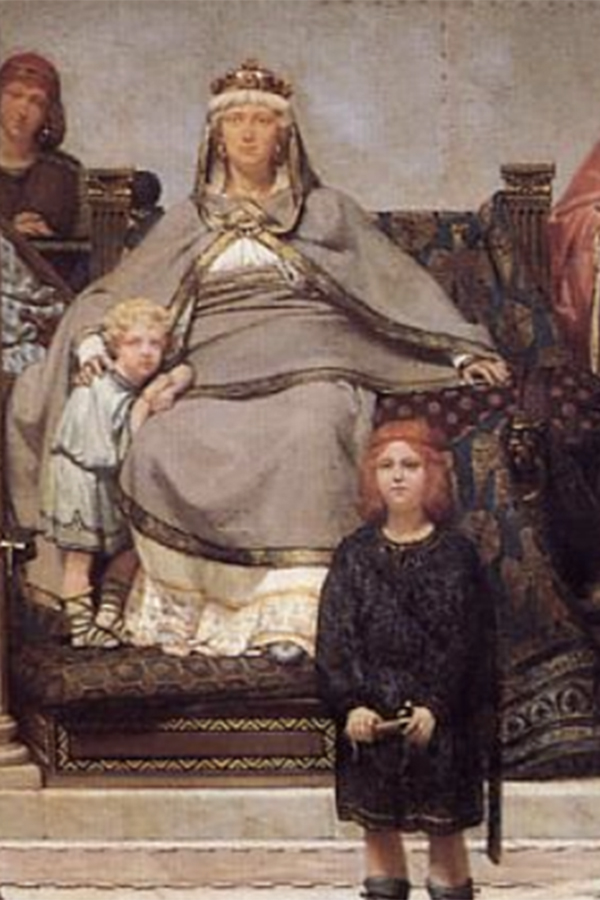
Lawrence Alma-Tadema, The Education of the Children of Clovis (1861), detail

== See also ==
- List of Catholic saints
- List of Frankish queens

== Works cited ==
- Baring-Gould, Sabine (1897). The Lives of the Saints. Vol. 1. John C. Nimbo Publishers.
- Butler, Alban (1995). "St Clotilda, Widow". In Thurston, Herbert J.; Attwater, Donald (eds.). Butler's Lives of the Saints. Westminster, Maryland: Christian Classics. pp. 462–463.
- Dunbar, Agnes B.C. (1904). A Dictionary of Saintly Women. Vol. 1. London: George Bell & Sons. pp. 191–193.
- McNamara, Jo Ann; Halborg, John E.; Whatley, E. Gordon, eds. (1992). Sainted Women of the Dark Ages. Duke University Press. ISBN 0-8223-1200-X.
