= Godegisel =

Son of the Burgundian king Gondioc (died 501)

Godegisel (? – 501) was a Burgundian sub-king and son of the Burgundian king Gondioc.

Godegisel was the educator and uncle of Clotilde, wife of the Frankish king Clovis I. Beginning in 463 he was a sub-king of Kingdom of the Burgundians. With the help of Clovis, Godegisel attempted to become the king of all the Kingdom of the Burgundians by eliminating his brother Gundobad. Gundobad had previously seized the rest of the kingdom after the assassination of their brother Chilperic II, the father of Clotilde.

With the promise of annual tribute and territorial cessions, Clovis agreed to aid Godegisel, and in 500 (or 501) Clovis entered the Burgundian territory, compelling Gundobad to march against the invaders and request his brother's aid. When the armies arrived outside of Dijon, Gundobad found himself fighting both the Franks and his brother. Defeated, Gundobad fled to Avignon, while Godigisel retired to Vienne. Clovis followed Gundobad to Avignon and began besieging it, only to abandon the operation and make peace with Gundobad. In 501 Gundobad was able to recover his territory with Visigothic aid. Gundobad murdered Godegisel in Vienne, and replaced him with his son Sigismund. He was married to Teudelinda, who also died at Vienne.

== Sources ==
- Hodgkin, Italy and Her Invaders, Book IV, Ch. 9 (pp323-350)
- Reinhold Kaiser: Die Burgunder (Kohlhammer-Urban-Taschenbücher. Bd. 586). Kohlhammer Verlag, Stuttgart 2004, ISBN 3-17-016205-5, S. 57 und S. 114–116.
- Kaiser, Reinhold (2004). Die Burgunder (in German). Stuttgart: Verlag W. Kohlhammer. ISBN 3-17-016205-5.
- Wood, Ian N. (2021), "The Making of the 'Burgundian Kingdom", Reti Medievali Journal, 22 (2): 111–140, doi:10.6093/1593-2214/7721, ISSN 1593-2214
