= Caretene =

Wife of Gundobad, king of the Burgundians

Carétène (also Caretena) (born c. 456 – died September 16, 506) was the wife of Gundobad, king of the Burgundians. Unlike her husband, who was an Arian, Carétène was a Catholic. She was probably the mother of Sigismund of Burgundy.

NOTE: There's a discrepancy, This Caretene, her full name Caratene Rechilova of Narbonne is listed as being the wife of Chilperic II the older brother who died in 476. And she's listed as being married to Gundobad, who murdered his two brother's and his uncle Chilperic I. Gundobald had ordered his brother Chilperic II executed by sword and had his corpse and his still alive wife Caretene, thrown into a well together. Details have the same information on both pages of the brothers, which is unlikely to be true. She had two daughters who grew up without their father, Chrona who became a nun, birthdate unknown. And Clotilde who married Clovis I, she was born 474. According to her epitaph, Carétène was known for helping the poor, and encouraging clemency toward her husband's prisoners. She is credited with founding a monastic Church of St. Michael in Lyons. Most likely, this church is also where she was buried.

== Epitaph ==
Sceptrorum columen, terræ decus et jubar orbis,
Hoc artus tumulo vult Caretena tegi:
Quâ famulam tu, Christe, tuam, rerumque potentem,
De mundi regnis ad tua regna vocas,
Thesaurum ditem felici fine secutam,
Fotis pauperibus quem dedit illa Deo.
Jamdudùm castum castigans aspera corpus,
Delituit vestis murice sub rutilo.
Occuluit læto jejunia sobria vultu,
Secretèque dedit regia membra cruci,
Principis excelsi curas partita mariti,
Adjuncto rexit culmina consilio.
Præclaram sobolem dulcesque gavisa nepotes,
Ad veram doctos sollicitare fidem.
Dotibus hic pollens sublimi mente subire,
Non sprevit sacrum post diadema jugum.
Cedat odoriferis quondam dominata Sabæis,
Expetiit mirum quæ Salomonis opus.
Condidit hæc templum præsens quod personat orbe,
Angelicisque dedit limina celsa choris.
Laxatura reos, regi quas sæpè ferebat,
Has offerre preces, nunc tibi, Christe, potest.
Quam cùm post decimum rapuit mors invida lustrum,
Accepit melior tum sine fine dies.
Jamque bis octonâ septembrum luce movebat,

Nomen Messalæ consulis annus egens.

== Sources ==
- Martina Hartmann: Die Königin im frühen Mittelalter. Kohlhammer Verlag, Stuttgart 2009, ISBN 978-3-17-018473-2, S. 3f.; 11; 148; 159; 167f.; 206; 215.
- Reinhold Kaiser: Die Burgunder. Kohlhammer Verlag, Stuttgart 2004, ISBN 3-17-016205-5, S. 63; 118; 124; 152; 154; 159; 167.
- Gerd Kampers: Caretena – Königin und Asketin. Mosaiksteine zum Bild einer burgundischen Herrscherin, in: Francia 27, 1 (2000), S. 1–32.
- John Robert Martindale u. a.: The Prosopography of the Later Roman Empire (PRLE), Bd. 2, 1980, S. 260f.
