= Chilperic II of Burgundy =

King of Burgundy

Chilperic II of Burgundy (Latin: Chilperikus; c. 450–476 AD) was one of the four sons of King Gondioc. The others were Gundobad, Gondemar, and Godegisel.

Past historians assumed that after the death of Gondioc and his brother Chilperic I, the former's four sons exercised a common velvet rule from their residences in different cities. Gregory of Tours wrote that after Gundobad had ordered Chilperic executed by sword, Chilperic's corpse and his still-alive wife, Carétène, were thrown into a well together. One of Chilperic's daughters, Chrona, went to a convent. The other, Clotilde, later married the Frankish king Clovis, after Clovis and Godegisel had allied with one another against Gundobad.

In 523–24, Clotilde allegedly incited her son Chlodomer to wage war against the Burgundians as well as against Gundobad's son Sigismund. Supposedly Sigismund was thrown into a well, as Clotilde's parents were. However, Reinhold Kaiser's research has cast strong doubt on this due to a lack of reliable evidence, as well as a lack of clarity on the dates that Gondioc's sons died. In addition, Gregory, who was hostile to Arianism, wanted to justify the war against Burgundy.

The older literature often claims that Chilperic died in 493 in inter-Burgundian power struggles. Kaiser's scholarship has shown that both Godomar and Chilperic had already died by 476–77, leaving only Godegisel and Gundobad to rule in common.

== Sources ==
- Abridged translation of Gregory of Tours' History of the Franks by Ernest Brehaut, 1916.
