= Gundobad =

King of the Burgundians (c. 452–516 AD)

- Patricius (Note: Previously held the title in 472–473, succeeding his uncle Ricimer.)
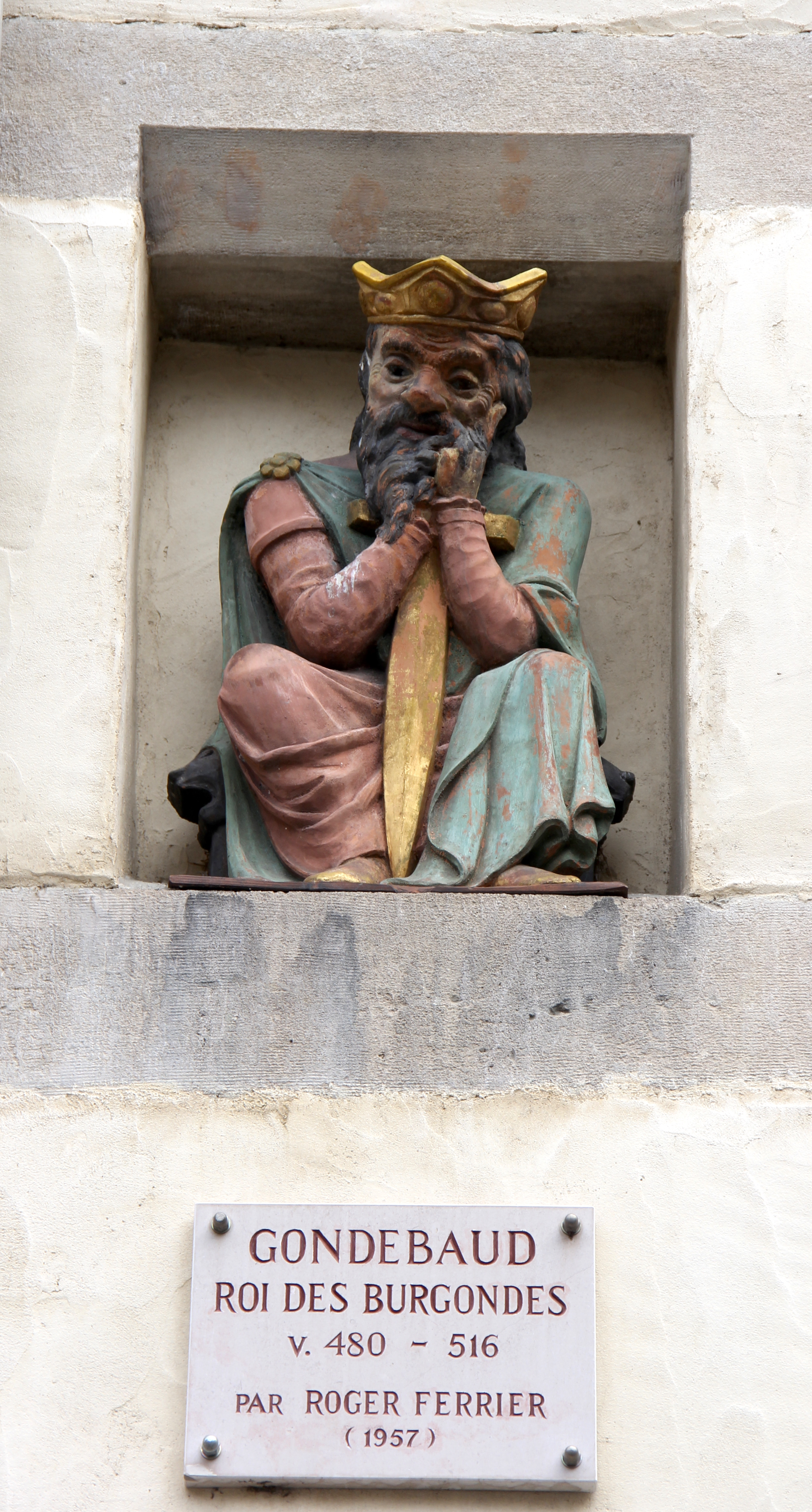
- Whimsical statuette of Gundobad on a facade of the Place du Bourg-de-Four in Geneva, Switzerland

King of the Burgundians
- Reign: 473–516
- Predecessor: Gundioc
- Successor: Sigismund
- Co-rulers: See list: Chilperic I (473–c. 480); Chilperic II (473–493); Godomar I (473–476); Godegisel (473–501)
- Born: c. 452; Burgundy, Gaul (present-day Bourgogne-Franche-Comté, France)
- Died: 516
- Spouse: Caretene
- Issue: Sigismund; Godomar II
- Father: Gundioc
- Mother: Sister of Ricimer
- Religion: Arianism
- Military career
- Allegiance: Western Roman Empire
- Branch: Roman army
- Service years: 472–473
- Rank: Magister militum (472–473) (Note: Later awarded the title in the East during his time as King.)

Gundobad (Latin: Flavius Gundobadus; French: Gondebaud, Gondovald; c. 452 – 516) was King of the Burgundians (473–516), succeeding his father Gundioc of Burgundy. Previous to this, he had been a patrician of the moribund Western Roman Empire in 472–473, three years before its collapse, succeeding his uncle Ricimer. He is perhaps best known today as the probable issuer of the Lex Burgundionum legal codes, which synthesized Roman law with ancient Germanic customs. He was the husband of Caretene.

== Early life ==
Gundobad seized the title of Patrician when his uncle Ricimer, who had been the power behind the throne for the Western Empire, died on 18 August 472. According to John of Antioch, Gundobad had previously executed the deposed emperor Anthemius on his uncle's orders.

Once in power, Gundobad elevated the current comes domesticorum, Glycerius, to the position of Roman emperor in the West. However, not long after this, Gundobad left for Burgundy where his father, Gundioc, had died; the exact date is unclear, with authorities stating it was in either 473 or 474. Once in Burgundy, his three brothers presumably challenged his rule: Godegisel, Chilperic II and Godomar I. Ian Wood speculates that Gundobad's departure may have been connected with the arrival of a new emperor, Julius Nepos, who had the support of the Roman emperor in the East. Once Julius Nepos landed in Portus (June 474), he deposed Glycerius, whom he made Bishop of Salona.

== Reign ==
The events of the first decades of Gundobad's reign are not well known. The only available source that covers this part of his reign is Gregory of Tours, who wrote almost a century later. According to Gregory, Gundobad set about ridding himself of his brothers. First slain was Gundomar, though little is known of this encounter.

Next killed was Chilperic. According to Gregory, Gundobad had his wife drowned by tying a stone around her neck, and had Chilperic's two daughters driven into exile. The older daughter, Chroma, became a nun. The other, Clotilde, had been seen by envoys of Clovis I, King of the Franks, who told their master of her beauty and intelligence. Clovis then asked Gundobad for Clotilde's hand in marriage. Gundobad was said to have been afraid to deny him.

However, a letter written by Avitus, bishop of Vienne, consoling Gundobad on the death of a daughter whose name is not mentioned, suggests there was more to the story. According to the explication of Danuta Shanzer and Ian Wood of Avitus' notoriously difficult Latin, the bishop writes, "In the past, with ineffable tender-heartedness, you mourned the deaths of your brothers." Further, Avitus alludes to Gundobad's intent to marry his deceased daughter to a foreign ruler, who, they suggest, was Clovis: "Indeed," they write, "Clovis is really the only likely candidate as a prospective son-in-law for Gundobad shortly after 501." If their reading is correct, then it is likely that Clotilde was offered to Clovis as an act of diplomacy, not subservience.

At this point occurs the earliest firm date in Gundobad's reign: in the early months of 490, while Odoacer and Theodoric the Great were locked in battle over control of Pavia, the Burgundians seized the opportunity to invade northwestern Italy. They devastated Liguria, and carried away an unknown number of victims into captivity, if not slavery. Once Theodoric had killed Odoacer and was securely in control of Italy, he sent bishop Epiphanius of Pavia on a mission to ransom as many of these captives as possible. Accompanied by Bishop Victor of Turin, they crossed the Alps in March. Shanzer and Wood believe Epiphanius was possibly also entrusted with a mission in connection with the marriage of Gundobad's son Sigismund to Theodoric's daughter Ostrogotho. In his account of this visit, Magnus Felix Ennodius, who accompanied Epiphanius on this journey, describes Godegisel as germanus regis, the "king's brother", and not king—again contradicting Gregory of Tours' later account. Ennodius notes that "more than six thousand souls" were so ransomed; from Lyons alone 400 men were thus freed.

Gregory of Tours states the battle with Gundobad's third brother, Godegisel, raged long. Unaware of the other's actions, each called upon Clovis trying to persuade him to join forces against the other. Clovis sided with Godegisel, who had offered him his pleasure of tribute; Wood observes that Clovis' wife, Clotilde, whose father had been killed by Gundobad, "was not likely to encourage good relations between the Franks and the Burgundians." Together they crushed Gundobad's force. Gundobad fled but King Clovis pursued him to Avignon. Gundobad feared the worst with Clovis's army at the gates. But Aridius went from Gundobad to Clovis and convinced him to spare Gundobad in return for a yearly tribute. The chronicler Marius of Avenches dates this conflict to 500.

Gundobad later broke his promise of tribute as he regained his power and besieged Godegisel, trapped in the city of Vienne. As famine devoured Vienne, Godegisel expelled the common people from the city for fear of his own survival. An outraged expelled artisan seeking vengeance on Godegisel went to Gundobad, and with his help he navigated the aqueduct and broke into the city. Gundobad murdered Godegisel in 501 in an Arian church along with the bishop.

The next event about which information has survived is Gundobad's role concerning the Battle of Vouillé. He was one of several rulers to whom king Theoderic sent letters urging peace, and asking for mediation between Alaric II and Clovis. Despite Theoderic's best efforts, the two kings met at Vouillé, and Alaric was slain; according to Isidore of Seville, Gundobad supported Clovis in this battle. Isidore also provides a hint that Gundobad exploited the Visigothic defeat by plundering Narbonne. Delayed by the threat of the Byzantine navy, which had been hovering off the Italian shore around the time of the battle, the Ostrogothic army arrived to relieve the Burgundian siege of Arles. According to Herwig Wolfram, the Burgundians were "the real victims of the Ostrogothic counteroffensive" following the defeat of their cousins at Vouillé. "Not only had they lost all their conquered territories and hope of acquiring Arles and Avignon but all their territory as far as Orange had been devastated."

Following the death of King Clovis of the Franks in 511, the Burgundians became the most prestigious people in Gaul. Gundobad was favored by the court of Constantinople, which awarded him the title of magister militum.

Gundobad died peacefully, succeeded by his son Sigismund in 516. He also had another son, Godomar II, who would succeed his brother after his execution in 524.

== Learning ==
In some of the manuscripts of the Lex Burgundionum, Gundobad is stated to have published this code of law on 29 March of the second year of his reign (474 or 475). However, there are a number of inconsistencies in this ascription, and L. R. deSalis proposed a restored version of this passage which does not include a date—which would better fit the reign of his son, Sigismund. Although she accepts the strong likelihood that the Lex Burgundionum as we have it was the product of Sigismund's reign, Katherine Fisher Drew still argues that a core of this law code is the product of Gundobad or his chancellery.

The letters of bishop Avitus and Cassiodorus provide glimpses of Gundobad's intellectual side. Avitus, a Nicene bishop, answers questions posed by an Arian Christian about religion in several letters, showing a great religious tolerance, and this may be the reason Gregory of Tours later thought he had secretly converted to Nicene Christianity. Cassiodorus' Variae includes a group of letters which discuss obtaining and sending a time piece to Gundobad as a diplomatic present.

== Notes ==
Regnal titles
Preceded by Gundioc	King of the Burgundians; 473–516	Succeeded by Sigismund
Military offices
Preceded by Ricimer	Magister militum of the Western Roman army 472–473	Succeeded by Ecdicius; In 474
