= List of Frankish kings =

Map of the Frankish kingdom (481–814)

Animated map of Frankish expansion

The Franks, Germanic peoples that invaded the Western Roman Empire in the 5th century, were first led by individuals called duces and reguli. The earliest group of Franks that rose to prominence was the Salian Merovingians, who conquered most of Roman Gaul, as well as the Gaulish territory of the Visigothic Kingdom, following the Battle of Vouillé in 507 AD.

The sons of Clovis I, the first king of all Franks, conquered the Burgundian and the Alamanni kingdoms, as well as Provence, and went on to make the peoples of the Bavarii and Thuringii their clients. The Merovingians were later replaced by the new Carolingian dynasty in the 8th century. By the late 10th century, the Carolingians themselves had been replaced throughout much of their realm by other dynasties.

The exact timeline of Frankish rulers has been difficult to trace since the realm, according to old Germanic practice, was always divided among the sons of a king. These territories were eventually reunited through marriage, treaties, or, more frequently, conquest. There were often multiple Frankish kings who ruled different territories, and divisions of the territories were not very consistent over time.

As inheritance traditions changed over time, the divisions of Francia (the lands of the Franks) started to become kingdoms that were more permanent. West Francia formed the heart of what was to become the Kingdom of France, while East Francia evolved into the Kingdom of Germany. A third realm, Middle Francia, was soon divided between West and East Francia.

As each realm developed its own culture, the idea of a single Frankish kingdom gradually disappeared. The last monarchs to use the title of "King of the Franks" (Rex Francorum) were Emperor Henry III (r. 1046–1056) in the East and Philip II of France (r. 1180–1223) in the West. (Note: In France, however, Francorum Rex continued to be sometimes used, for example by Louis XII in 1499, by Francis I in 1515, and by Henry II in about 1550; it was also used on coins up to the 18th century.)

== Early Frankish rulers ==
- Genobaud (3rd century?)
- Merogais and Ascaric (4th century)
- Marcomer (4th century), dux
- Sunno (4th century), dux
- Genobaud (4th century), dux
- Mallobaudes (4th century)
- Theodemer (5th century)
- Ragnachar (died c. 509), killed by Clovis
- Chararic (died c. 509), killed by Clovis

=== "Salian Franks" in Northern France ===
- Chlodio (c. 420-450)
- Merovech (c. 450–457), perhaps a relative of Chlodio
- Childeric I (c. 457–481), son of Merovech
- Clovis I (c. 481–511), the first Merovingian king, who ruled all Franks by 509

=== "Ripuarian Franks" in Cologne ===
- Childebert (5th century)
- Sigobert the Lame (died c. 509), killed at the instigation of Clovis
- Chlodoric the Parricide (died c. 509), son of Sigobert, killed by Clovis

== Merovingian dynasty (509–751) ==
Clovis I united all the Frankish petty kingdoms as well as most of Roman Gaul under his rule, conquering the Domain of Soissons of the Roman general Syagrius as well as the Visigothic Kingdom of Toulouse (Aquitaine). He took his seat at Paris, which along with Soissons, Reims, Metz, and Orléans became the chief residences. Upon his death, his four sons – and later his grandsons – split the kingdom among them. Every son received a part of the original Frankish territory and also a part of the newly acquired Aquitaine. This system remained in practice during the whole Merovingian and Carolingian periods, always resulting in civil war between the brothers.

- Kings in Austrasia (Reims/Metz); lines of Theuderic I and Sigibert I
- Kings in Orléans; lines of Chlodomer and Guntram
- Kings in Paris; lines of Childebert I and Charibert I
- Kings in Neustria (Soissons); lines of Chlothar I and Chilperic I
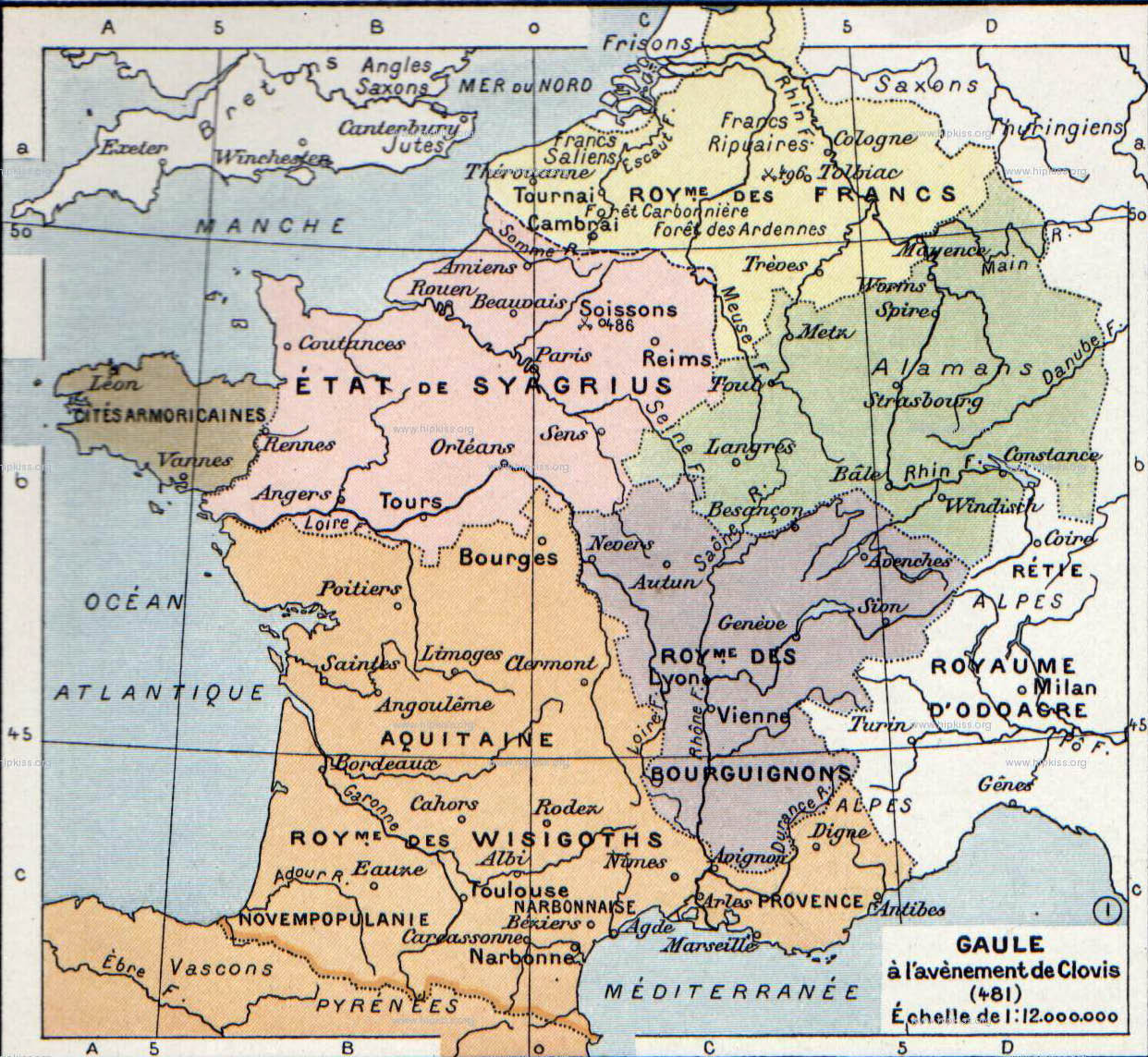
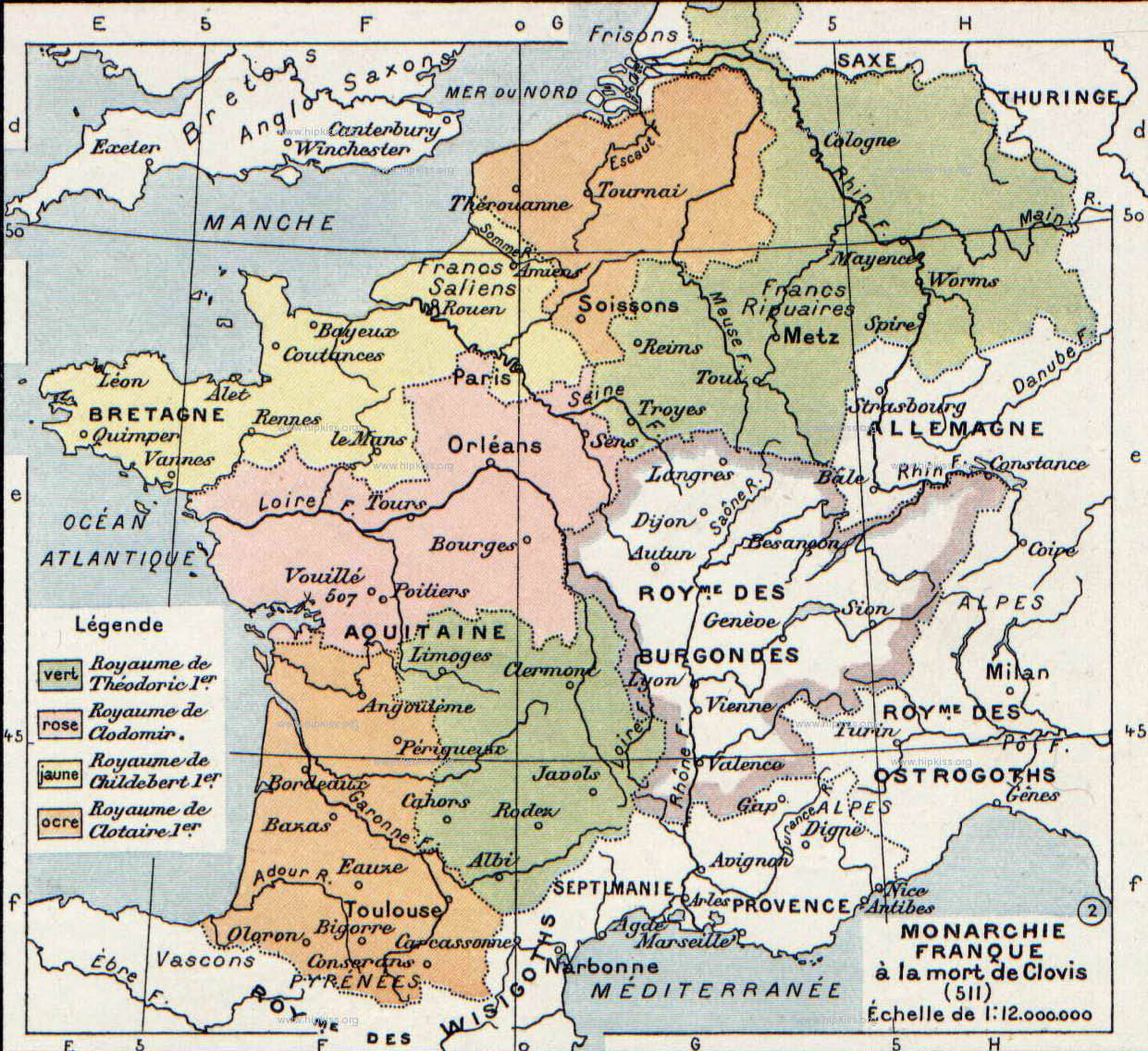
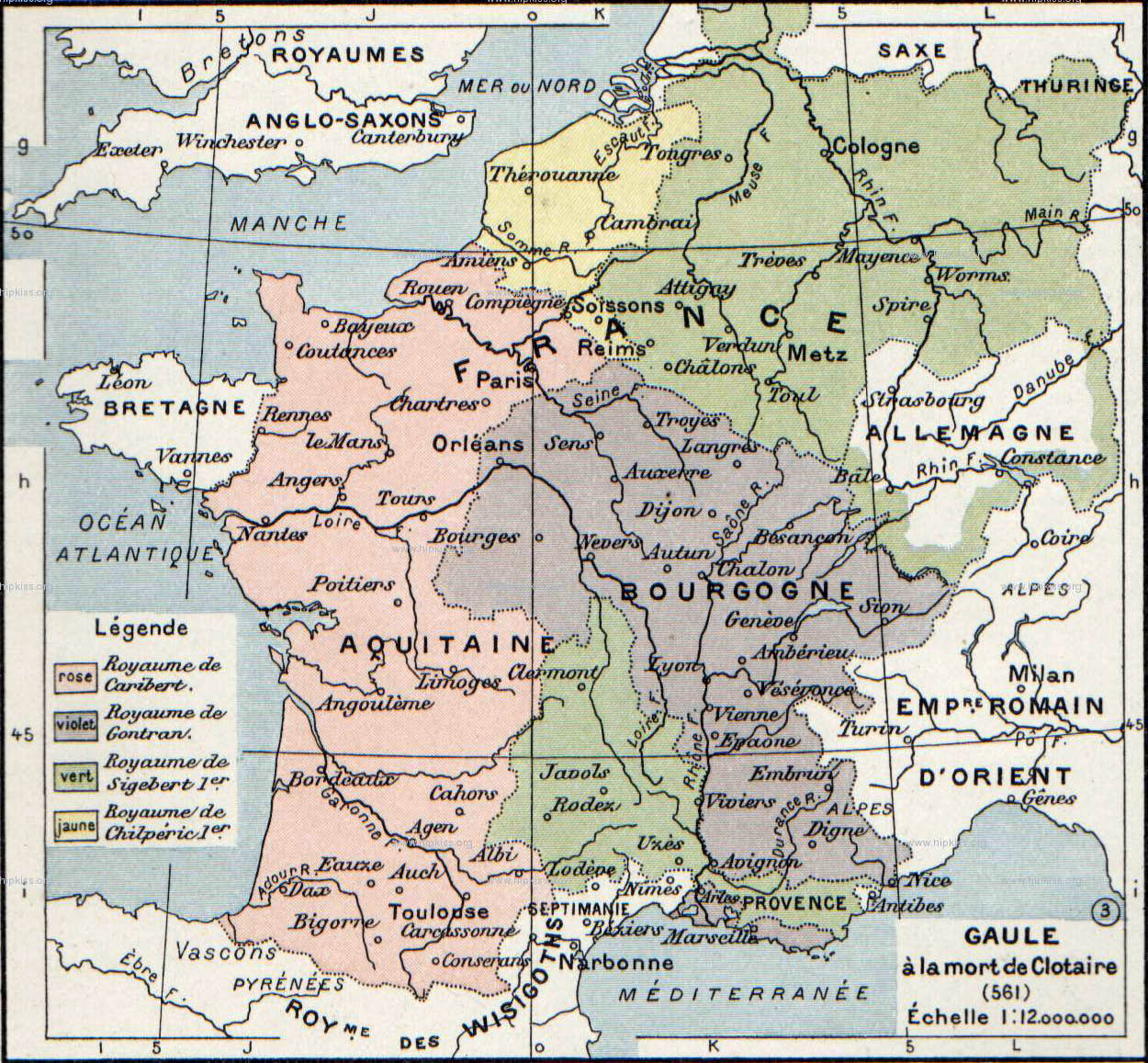
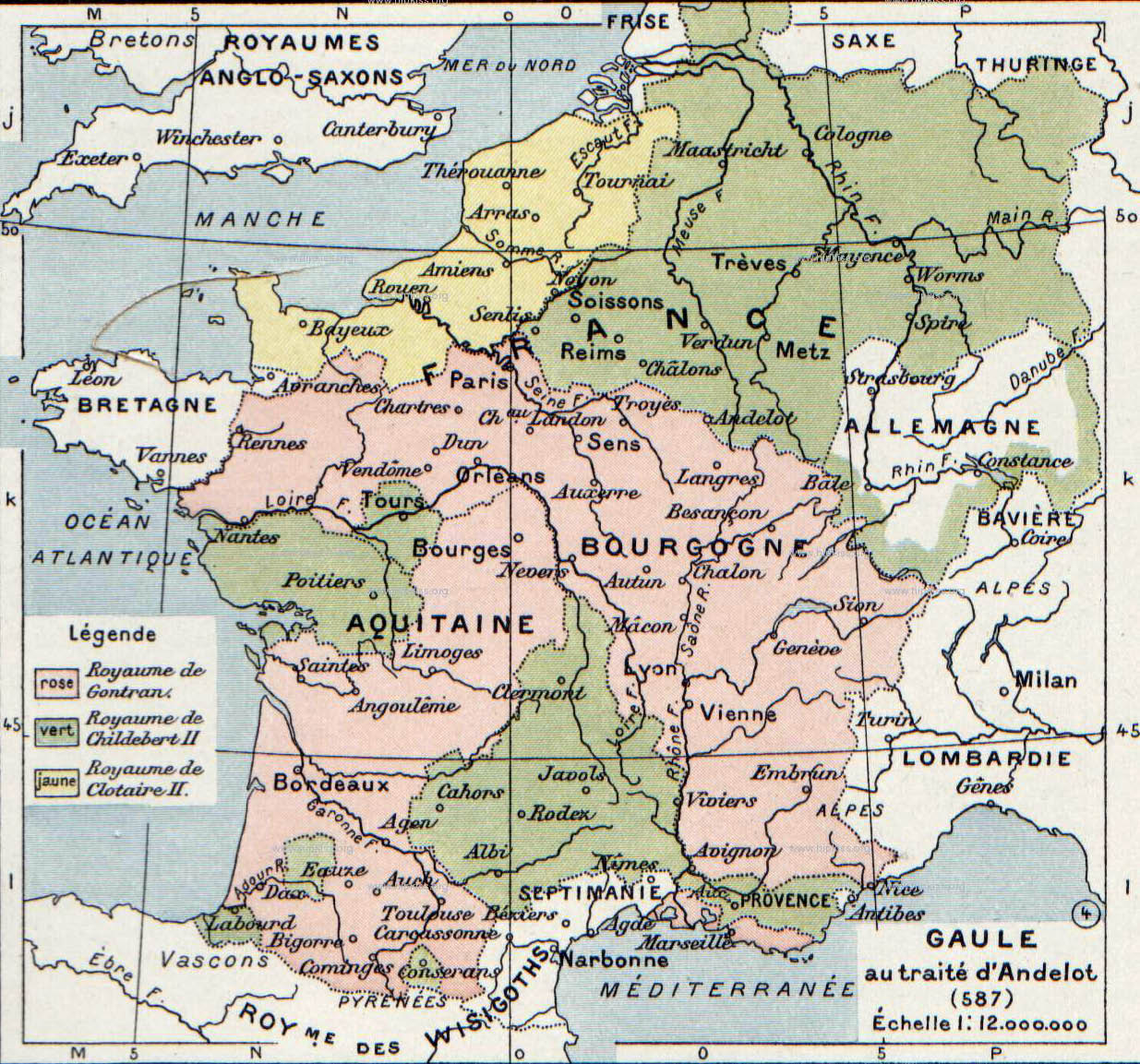
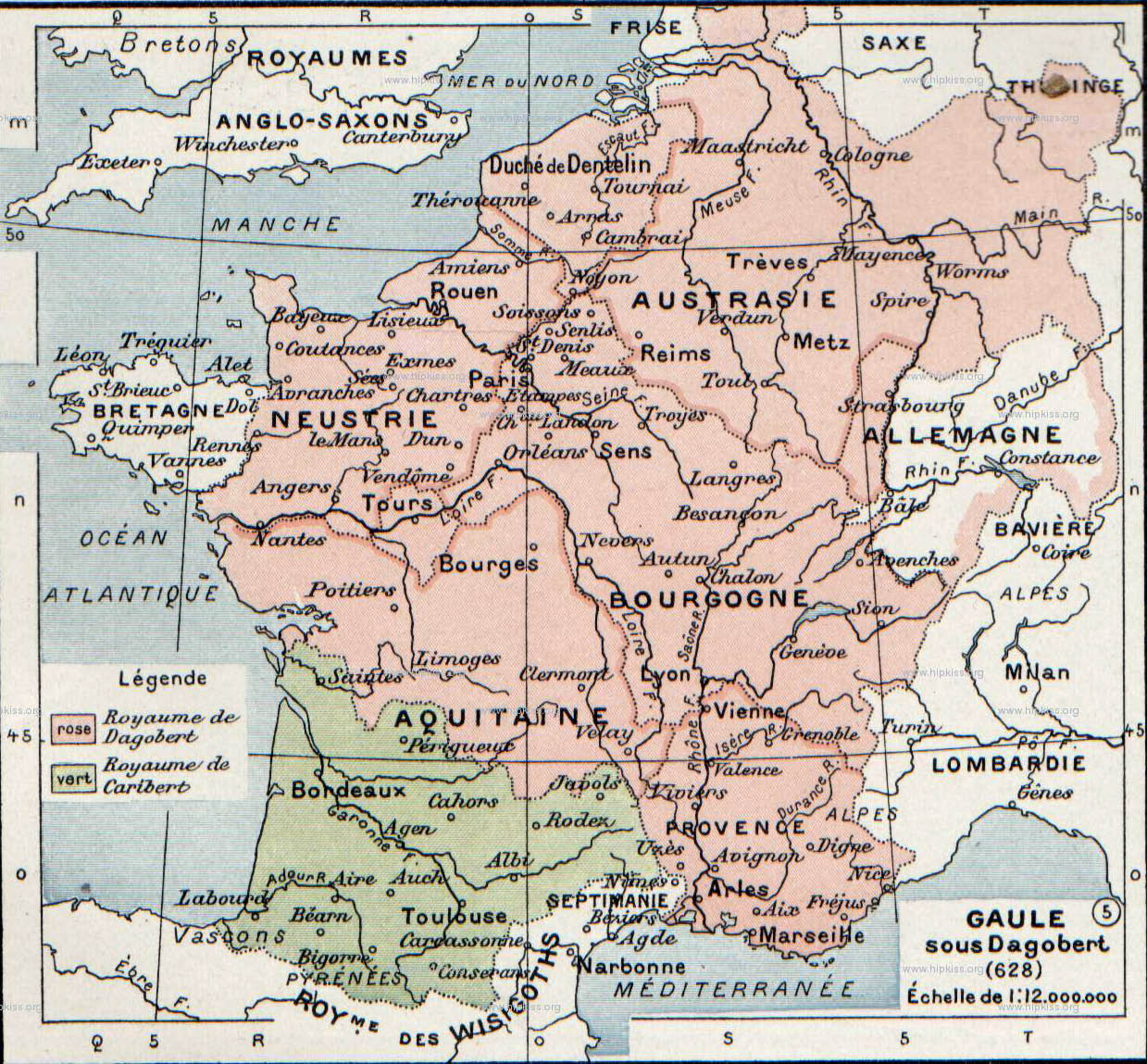
Evolution of the Frankish kingdom (AD 481, 511, 561, 587, and 628), by Paul Vidal de La Blache (1894).

Portrait	King	Reign	Succession	Marriage(s)	Life details
Non-contemporary	Clovis I King of all Franks	c. 509 (Note: The most frequently cited date is 481, the year Clovis succeeded his father Childeric I. However, at that time he was only one of several Frankish chiefs, and it was not until the end of his 30-year reign that all Franks were unified under his rule.) – 27 November 511 (2 years)	Son of Childeric I and grandson of Merovech. Ruled initially over the Salian and later Ripuarian Franks; killed his rivals and became sole king	Clotilde	c. 466 – 27 November 511 (aged ~45) King of the Salian Franks since 481; conquered Gaul in 486 and Aquitaine in 507. Baptized on Christmas Day in 508
—	Theuderic I King of Austrasia	December 511 – 534 (nearly 23 years)	Eldest son of Clovis and an earlier concubine	Suavegotha	Clovis' eldest son; died of natural causes
coin	Chlodomer; King of Orléans	December 511 – 21 June 524 (12 years and 6 months)	Eldest son of Clovis I and Clotilde	Guntheuc	c. 496 – 21 June 524 (Note: Chlodomer's date of death is found in a contemporary inscription from Anse, Rhône. The chronology of the Frankish kings is disputed. Royal documents or inscriptions are often used to calculate a given king's tenure, but this is not always certain. Some authors give the death of Charibert II as 8 April 632, but sources actually indicate that he died between January 631 and 8 April 632. Likewise, the death of Chlothar II is sometimes given as 18 October 629, but this date actually refers to his latest attestation.) (aged ~28) Killed in Burgundy; his sons were then killed by his brothers, who divided his realm
coin	Childebert I King of Paris; King of Orléans (524–558)	December 511 – 23 December 558 (46 years)	Son of Clovis I and Clotilde. Later inherited Orléans after the death of Chlodomer in 524	Ultragotha	c. 498 – 23 December 558 (aged ~60) Conquered Burgundy alongside his brothers
coin	Chlothar I King of Neustria; King of Austrasia (555–561); King of all Franks (558–561)	December 511 – December 561 (50 years)	Youngest son of Clovis I and Clotilde; ruled over the Salian heartlands and briefly reunited Francia in 558	List: (1) Ingund (2) Aregund (3) Guntheuc (4) Radegund (5) Chunsina (6) Vuldetrada	c. 500 – December 561 (aged ~61) Longest-reigning Frankish monarch
coin	Theudebert I King of Austrasia	534 – 548 (14 years)	Son of Theuderic I and Suavegotha	(1) Vuldetrada (2) Deuteria	c. 500 – 548 (aged ~48) First king to mint his own coins
—	Theudebald; King of Austrasia	548 – 555 (7 years)	Son of Theudebert I and Deuteria	Waldrada	c. 535 – November/December 555 (aged ~28) Died of illness; his realm was taken by Chlothar I
coin	Charibert I King of Paris & Aquitaine	December 561 – December 567 (6 years)	Eldest son of Chlothar I and Ingund	List: (1) Ingoberga (2) Merofleda (3) Marcovefa (4) Theudechild	c. 521 – December 567 (aged ~46) At his death his brothers divided his realm
coin	Chilperic I King of Neustria; King of Paris (567–584)	December 561 – September 584 (22 years and 9 months)	Son of Chlothar I and Aregund	(1) Audovera (2) Galswintha (3) Fredegund	c. 523/9 – September 584 (aged 55–61) Assassinated, possibly at the instigation of Sigebert I
coin	Guntram; King of Orléans; King of Paris (584–592)	December 561 – 28 March 592 (1 year and 3 months)	Son of Chlothar I and Ingund	(1) Vénérande (2) Marcatrude (3) Austregilde	c. 532 – 28 March 592 (aged ~60) Revered as a saint by the Catholic Church
	Sigebert I King of Austrasia	December 561 – December 575 (13 years and 11 months)	Son of Chlothar I and Ingund	Brunhilda	c. 535 – December 575 (aged ~40) Fought a civil war against Chilperic; assassinated at the instigation of queen Fredegund
coin	Childebert II; King of Austrasia; King of Orléans (592–596)	December 575 – November 595 (9 years and 11 months)	Son of Sigebert I and Brunhilda; began his reign as a baby	Faileuba	c. 570 – November 595 (o 596) (aged ~25) Poisoned by Chlothar II during their civil war
coin	Gundoald (disputed); King of Aquitaine	584 – 585 (a few months)	Usurper king; claimed to be a son of Chlothar I	—	Revolted with the support of Eastern emperor Maurice, defeated and killed by Guntram's forces
coin	Chlothar II; King of Neustria; King of all Franks (613–629)	September 584 – September 629 (45 years)	Son of Chilperic I and Fredegund; began his rule as a baby under several regencies	(1) Haldetrude (2) Bertrude (3) Sichilde	May/June 584 – September 629 (aged 45) Fought several wars against his brothers and queen Brunhilda, whom he executed in 613
coin	Theudebert II; Austrasia	596 – 612 (16 years)	Son of Childebert II and grandson of queen Brunhilda, who ruled as regent	(1) Bilichild (2) Théodechilde	c. 586 – 612 (aged ~26) Deposed and murdered by Chlothar II
coin	Theuderic II; King of Orléans; King of Austrasia (612–613)	596 – 613 (17 years)	Son of Childebert II and grandson of queen Brunhilda, who ruled as regent	Ermenberga	c. 587 – 613 (aged ~26) Fought his cousin and brother; died of natural causes
coin	Sigebert II; King of Orléans, Paris & Austrasia	613 (very briefly)	Son of Theuderic II	—	c. 602– late 612 (aged ~10) Murdered while still a child by Chlothar II
coin	Charibert II; King of Aquitaine	September 629 – 632 (less than 2 years)	Son of Chlothar II	—	c. 606 – 632 (aged ~26) Died of natural causes, or assassinated
—	Chilperic; King of Aquitaine	632 (very briefly)	Son of Charibert II	—	Succeeded as a baby and was killed shortly after; may have never actually reigned
coin	Dagobert I King of Austrasia; King of Neustria (629–639); King of all Franks (632–639)	February/March 623 – 19 January 639 (9 years and 2 months)	Son of Chlothar II	List: (1) Gomentrude (2) Nanthild (3) Ragnetrude (?) (4) Berchildis (5) Wulfegundis	c. 603 – 19 January 639 (aged ~35) Last Merovingian to exercise real power; first king to be buried in the Basilica of Saint-Denis

=== Puppet kings (639–751) ===
Francia was reunified by Chlothar II and his son Dagobert I. By that time the realms of Neustria, Burgundy and Austrasia had developed regional identities. In order to appease the local nobility, Austrasia, which composed the Western half of the kingdom, was usually ruled by a separate king, often a son or brother of the king ruling in Neustria and Burgundy. A similar arrangement for Aquitaine was short-lived. The kings of this period are known as the roi fainéant, "do-nothing kings" who were increasingly overshadowed by their mayors of the palace. Most of them began their reign as children and died young.

==== Kings in Neustria ====
Portrait	King	Reign	Succession	Marriage(s)	Life details
coin	Clovis II; King of Neustria	19 January 639 – October 657 (18 years and 9 months)	Son of Dagobert I	Balthild	c. 633/4 – Sept/Nov 657 (aged ~22/23) Held no real power
coin	Chlothar III; King of Neustria; King of all Franks (c. 662)	October 657 – April 673 (5 years and 6 months)	Son of Clovis II; briefly reunified Francia in 662 but was forced to divide it again	—	c. 652 – March/May 673 (aged ~21) Died suddenly of unknown causes
— Francia briefly reunified by Childeric II —
carved portrait	Theuderic III; King of Neustria; King of all Franks (679–691)	late 675 – early 691 (nearly 16 years)	Son of Clovis II; exiled by mayor of the palace Ebroin in 673 but restored to the throne after Childeric's murder. Reunified Francia in 679	Chrothildis	c. 651 – early 691 (aged ~40) Defeated Dagobert II at the Battle of Lucofao in 679, but was himself defeated at the Battle of Tertry against the Austrasian mayor Pepin of Herstal in 687

==== Kings in Austrasia ====
Portrait	King	Reign	Succession	Marriage(s)	Life details
coin	Sigebert III; King of Austrasia	633 – 1 February 656 (33 years)	Son of Dagobert I; proclaimed king while as a baby	Chimnechild	c. 630 – 1 February 656 (aged ~26) Ruled under several regencies
coin	Childebert III "the Adopted"; King of Austrasia	656–662 (?) (6 years?)	Son of mayor Grimoald and adopted son of Sigebert III	—	Exact chronology disputed; may have reigned only briefly before his execution in 662
— Francia briefly reunified by Chlothar III —
coin	Childeric II; King of Austrasia; King of all Franks (673–675)	662 – October 675 (13 years)	Second son of Clovis II; proclaimed king as a baby	Bilichild	c. 650 – October 675 (aged ~25) Assassinated in a conspiracy
coin	Clovis III (disputed); King of Austrasia	675 – 676 (1 year)	Son of Chlothar III; installed by mayor Ebroin after Childeric's murder	—	Obscure king often excluded from regnal lists
coin	Dagobert II; King of Austrasia	May 676 – 23 December 679 (3 years and 6 months)	Son of Sigebert III	—	c. 650 – 23 December 679 (aged ~29) Assassinated in a conspiracy

==== Successors of Theuderic III (691–751) ====
Portrait	King	Reign	Succession	Marriage(s)	Life details
—	Clovis IV; King of all Franks	691 – 695 (4 years)	Son of Theuderic III	—	c. 677 – 695 (aged ~18) Dominated by mayor Pepin of Herstal
	Childebert IV "the Just"; King of all Franks	695 – 14 April 711 (16 years)	Son of Theuderic III	Unknown	c. 680 – 695 (aged ~18) Said in to have been "a famous and just lord"
—	Dagobert III; King of all Franks	14 April 711 – late 715 (4 years)	Son of Childebert IV	Unknown	c. 698 – 715 (aged ~17) Yet another child king who died young
	Chilperic II Daniel; King of all Franks	late 715 – 13 February 721 (6 years)	Son of Childeric II	Unknown	c. 673 – 721 (aged ~48) Dominated by mayor Ragenfrid; fought mayor Charles Martel over the Austrasian lands
—	Chlothar IV (disputed); King of Austrasia	c. 718–719 (1 year)	Genealogy uncertain; installed as king by mayor Charles Martel	—	Obscure rival king
—	Theuderic IV; King of all Franks	13 February 721 – March/April 737 (16 years)	Son of Dagobert III	Unknown	c. 712 – March/April 737 (aged ~25) Dominated by mayor Charles Martel
— Interregnum; Francia is ruled by mayors Charles Martel and Pepin the Short —
—	Childeric III; King of all Franks	February 743 – November 751 (Note: November 751 is the most commonly cited date, although his deposition may have happened one or two months later.) (8 years and 9 months)	Genealogy uncertain; installed by Pepin	Unknown	Was deposed and died five years later

== Carolingian dynasty (751–987) ==
The Carolingians were originally mayors of the palace under the Merovingians, initially ruling over Austrasia. In 687, Pepin of Herstal took the title Duke and Prince of the Franks (dux et princeps Francorum) after his conquest of Neustria at the Battle of Tertry, which was cited by contemporary chroniclers as the beginning of Pepin's rule. His death in 714 was followed by a succession struggle. Finally, in 747 Pepin the Short became mayor of both Austrasia and Neustria, making him the de facto ruler of all Francia. He deposed king Childeric III and Pepin was himself crowned King of the Franks. His successor Charles, better known as Charlemagne, was crowned Emperor by the Pope in the year 800. The Carolingians reigned until 911 in the East, and 987 in the West, afterwich each crown passed to the local nobility. (Note: Still, virtually all European royal houses, including the current ones, are related to the Carolingians in one way or another. Hugh Capet, the first non-Carolingian king of France, was a descendant of Charlemagne's sons Louis the Pious and Pepin of Italy through his mother and paternal grandmother, respectively. He was also a grandson of Henry the Fowler, the first non-Carolingian king of Germany, who was in turn a great-grandson of Louis the Pious through his mother.)

Both the French and German monarchies claimed succession from the Carolingians. Thus Charlemagne and Louis the Pious are recorded as "Charles I" and "Louis I", after which the numbering diverges. (Note: These numbering arrangements are often arbitrary. Regnal numbers were not adopted until the reign of Emperor Lothair III, who was actually the second emperor of that name, while also the third king of Italy named Lothair (to add to confusion, the son of Emperor Lothair I is also known as Lothair II). Emperor Charles V adopted his regnal number by counting all emperors named Charles, including Charles the Bald, who never ruled over Germany. Charles V of France, however, decided to exclude Charles the Fat precisely because he was originally a German king. Emperor Louis IV was the fourth emperor of that name, but was at the same time the fifth king named Louis. The nickname "Louis the Younger" is simultaneously used for Emperor Louis II, king Louis of Saxony, and king Louis VII of France.) The title of Emperor lapsed in 924, but was revived in 962 by the Saxon king Otto the Great, an event cited by some scholars as the beginning of the Holy Roman Empire (Germany’s precursor), distinct from the earlier Carolingian Empire.

Junior king

Portrait	King	Reign	Succession	Marriage(s)	Life details
Non-contemporary	Pepin "the Short"; King of all Franks	November 751 – 24 September 768 (16 years and 10 months)	Son of Charles Martel; deposed the Merovingian dynasty with support of the papacy in Rome	Bertrada of Laon	c. 714 – 768 (aged ~54) Further expanded Frankish influence in Western Europe; died of natural causes
Non-contemporary	Carloman I King of Soissons	24 September 768 (Note: Carloman and Charlemagne were both crowned on 9 October 768, at Soissons and Noyon, respectively.) – 4 December 771 (3 years, 2 months and 8 days)	First son of Pepin the Short	Gerberga	751 – 4 December 771 (aged 20) Had a troublesome relationship with his brother
coin	Charles I "the Great"; King of Austrasia; King of all Franks (771–814); Holy Roman Emperor (800–814) (Note: The exact term "Holy Roman Emperor" was not adopted until the 12th century. By crowning Charlemagne as Imperator Romanorum, the papacy ceased recognition of Empress Irene as the legitimate ruler of the Roman Empire, which still survived in the Greek East.)	24 September 768 (Note: Crowned king of Austrasia on 9 October 768, at Noyon; became sole king on Carloman's death on 4 December 771, and was crowned emperor by Pope Leo III on 25 December 800, at Rome.) – 28 January 814 (45 years, 4 months and 4 days)	Second son of Pepin the Short; reunified the Frankish kingdom in 771	List: (1) Desiderata of the Lombards (2) Hildegard (3) Fastrada (4) Luitgard	2 April 748 (Note: Alternative birth years for Charlemagne include 742 and 747, but 748 is now considered the most likely.) – 28 January 814 (aged 65) Conquered Lombard Italy in 774 with support of the papacy and was crowned Roman Emperor in 800. Nicknamed the "Father of Europe", his reign also saw the beginning of the Carolingian Renaissance
—	Charles the Younger; King of Neustria	25 December 800 – 4 December 811 (11 years lacking 21 days)	Son of Charlemagne; never reigned independently	—	772/73 – 4 December 811 (aged 38–39) Obscure king overshadowed by his father
miniature	Pepin Carloman; King of Italy	15 April 781 – 8 July 810 (29 years, 2 months and 24 days)	Son of Charlemagne; never reigned independently	Theodrada (?)	777 – 8 July 810 (aged 33) Born as Carloman, renamed Pepin and crowned as a baby in Easter 781, at Rome
miniature	Bernard; King of Italy	8 July 810 – late 817 (7 years)	Son of Pepin; never reigned independently	Cunigunda of Laon	797 – 17 April 818 (aged 20–21) Refused to rule as subordinate of Lothair I as per Louis' Ordinatio imperii, revolted but was deposed and blinded, later dying from his wounds
miniature	Louis I "the Pious"; King of all Franks; Holy Roman Emperor	28 January 814 (Note: Crowned senior emperor in October 816 by Pope Stephen IV. He had been previously crowned king as a baby on 15 April 781, thus having a total de jure reign of 59 years, 2 months and 5 days. Louis was declared deposed on 1 October 833, but was restored five months later, on 1 March 834, and crowned again at Metz on 28 February 835. Thus his de facto reign amounts to 25 years and 11 months, while his de jure reign amounts to 58 years and 10 months.) – 20 June 840 (26 years, 4 months and 23 days)	Son of Charlemagne; crowned king of Aquitaine on 15 April 781 and co-emperor on 11 September 813	(1) Ermengarde of Hesbaye (2) Judith of Bavaria	Summer 778 – 20 June 840 (aged 62) His later years were marked internal strife and civil war between his sons; was briefly deposed between 1 October 833 and 1 March 834
coin	Pepin I King of Aquitaine	817 – 838 (21 years)	Son of Louis the Pious; never reigned independently	Unknown	797 – 13 December 838 (aged 39) Rebelled against his father, but was pardoned

Louis the Pious made many divisions of his empire during his lifetime. The final division, pronounced at Worms in 838, made Charles the Bald heir to the west, including Aquitaine, and Lothair heir to the east, including Italy and excluding Bavaria, which was left for Louis the German. However, following the emperor's death in 840, the empire was plunged into a civil war that lasted three years. The Frankish kingdom was then divided by the Treaty of Verdun in 843. Lothair was allowed to keep his imperial title and his kingdom of Italy, and was granted the newly created kingdom of Middle Francia, a corridor of land stretching from Italy to the North Sea. Charles was confirmed in Aquitaine, where Pepin I's son Pepin II was opposing him, and granted West Francia, which later became France. Louis the German was confirmed in Bavaria and granted East Francia, which would later become Germany.

Middle Francia
Portrait	King	Reign	Succession	Marriage(s)	Life details
miniature	Lothair I King of Middle Francia; Holy Roman Emperor	c. 10 August 843 (Note: Crowned senior emperor on 5 April 832 by Pope Paschal I; he had been previously named co-emperor and king in July 818, thus having a de jure reign of 37 years and 2 months. The exact date of the Treaty of Verdun is uncertain. 10 August is the date found in a document written shortly after the treaty was signed.) – 29 September 855 (12 years and 1 month ½)	Son of Louis the Pious; crowned co-emperor in July 818	Ermengarde of Tours	795 – 29 September 855 (aged 60) Suffered an illness and divided his realm in the Treaty of Prüm shortly before his death
Non-contemporary	Charles; King of Provence	29 September 855 – 25 January 863 (7 years, 3 months and 25 days)	Son of Lothair I	—	845 – 25 January 863 (aged 17–18) Died of epilepsy; his realm was partioned
seal	Lothair; King of Lotharingia	29 September 855 – 8 August 869 (13 years, 10 months and 10 days)	Son of Lothair I	(1) Teutberga (2) Waldrada	835 – 8 August 869 (aged 34) His divorce with his first wife led to his excommunication by Pope Nicholas I
Non-contemporary	Louis II; King of Italy; Holy Roman Emperor	29 September 855 (Note: Crowned emperor in 844 by Pope Sergius II, thus having a de jure reign of 31 years.) – 12 August 875 (19 years, 10 months and 14 days)	Son of Lothair I; crowned co-emperor in 844	Engelberga	822/25 – 12 August 875 (aged 50/53) Signed the Treaty of Meerssen that partioned Lotharingia in 870
Italy is absorbed into West and then East Francia before fragmenting on the death of Emperor Charles III

West Francia
Picture	King	Reign	Succession and notes
For more details, see List of French monarchs
miniature	Charles II "the Bald"; King of West Francia; King of Italy (875–877); Emperor (875–877)	c. 10 August 843 – 6 October 877	Son of Louis I
coin	Pepin II; King of Aqutaine	845–852	Grandson of Louis I; rival king to Charles II
coin	Charles the Child; King of Aqutaine	848–866	Young son of Charles II
coin	Louis II "the Stammerer"; King of West Francia	6 October 877 – 10 April 879	Son of Charles II
— Boso of Provence briefly breaks away from West Francia —
coin	Louis III; King of West Francia	10 April 879 – 5 August 882	Son of Louis II
coin	Carloman II; King of West Francia	10 April 879 – 6 December 884	Son of Louis II
— Empire briefly reunified by emperor Charles the Fat —
— Carolingian rule interrupted by Odo —
coin	Charles III "the Simple"; King of West Francia	3 January 898 – 29 June 922	Son of Louis II
— Carolingian rule interrupted by Robert I and Rudolph —
coin	Louis IV "from Overseas"; King of West Francia	19 June 936 – 10 September 954	Son of Charles III
bust	Lothair; King of West Francia	10 September 954 – 2 March 986	Son of Louis IV
miniature	Louis V "the Do-Nothing"; King of West Francia	2 March 986 – 22 May 987	Son of Lothair
For later monarchs, see in the List of French monarchs

East Francia
Picture	King	Reign	Succession and notes
For more details, see List of German monarchs
miniature	Louis II "the German"; King of East Francia	c. 10 August 843 – 28 August 882	Son of Louis I; divided his realm
miniature	Carloman "the Bavarian"; King of Bavaria; King of Italy (877–879)	28 August 876 – November 879	Son of Louis II; abdicated
miniature	Louis III "the Saxon"; King of Saxony; King of Bavaria (879–882)	28 August 876 – 20 January 882	Son of Louis II
coin	Charles III "the Fat"; King of Alamannia; King of Italy (879–887); Holy Roman Emperor (881–); King of East Francia (882–); King of all Franks (884–)	28 August 876 – November 887	Son of Louis II; reunited Francia in 884; deposed
seal	Arnulf; King of East Francia; King of Italy (894–899); Holy Roman Emperor (896–)	November 887 – 8 December 899	Son of Carloman
miniature	Louis IV "the Child"; King of East Francia	8 December 899 – 24 September 911	Son of Arnulf
For later monarchs, see List of German monarchs

== Later Frankish kings in Italy and Burgundy ==
After the deposition of Charles the Fat in 887, several Frankish nobles claimed the title of King of Italy and Emperor. At the same time, Rudolph I from Upper Burgundy broke away from the Carolingian Empire and established a kingdom of their own. Emperor Arnulf (king of East Francia/Germany) briefly managed to reclaim Italy between 894 and 899, after which it once again was ruled by independent kings. Both Italy and Burgundy were later absorbed into the Holy Roman Empire.

Rival kings in Italy
Portrait	King	Reign	Succession	House	Marriage(s)	Life details
seal	Berengar I King of Italy; Emperor (915–924)	December 887 (Note: Crowned emperor in early December 915 by Pope John X.) – 7 April 924 (36 years and 4 months)	Grandson of Louis the Pious; usurped the throne from Charles the Fat	Unruoching / Carolingian	Bertila of Spoleto	c. 850 – 7 April 924 (aged ~74) Fought several claimants to the throne. Murdered during his war against Rudolph I
Non-contemporary	Guy; King of Italy; Emperor (891–896)	February 889 (Note: Crowned emperor on 21 February 891 by Pope Stephen V.) – 12 December 894 (5 years and 10 months)	Great-grandson of Charlemagne; ruled in opposition to Berengar	Guideschi / Carolingian	Ageltrude	855 – 12 December (?) 894 (aged 39) Also briefly claimed West Francia in 888. Died after a blood haemorrhage
Non-contemporary	Lambert; Emperor in Italy	12 December 894 (Note: Crowned co-king in May 891, and co-emperor on 30 April 892 by Pope Formosus.) – 15 October 898 (3 years, 10 months and 3 days)	Son of Guy, crowned co-ruler in 891; ruled in opposition to Berengar	Guideschi / Carolingian	—	c. 880 – 15 October 898 (aged ~18) Died after falling from his horse
coin	Louis III "the Blind"; King of Provence; Emperor in Italy	12 October 900 (Note: Proclaimed king of Provence in August 890; crowned emperor in February 901 by Pope Benedict IV.) – 21 July 905 (4 years, 9 months and 9 days)	Son of Boso of Provence and grandson of Emperor Louis II; ruled in opposition to Berengar	Bivinid / Carolingian	Ana of Constantinople	c. 880 – 5 June 928 (aged ~48) Deposed and blinded by Berengar
— Italy is invaded by king Rudolph II of Burgundy in 922 —
Non-contemporary	Hugh; King of Italy	July 926 – early 947 (21 years)	Great-grandson of Emperor Lothair I; conquered Italy from the Burgundians	Bosonid / Carolingian	List: (1) Guilla of Provence (2) Alda (3) Marozia (4) Bertha of Swabia	c. 880 – 10 April 948 (aged ~67) Defeated by Berengar II in 945, but was allowed to maintain his title. Abdicated
Non-contemporary	Lothair II; King of Italy	early 947 – 20 November 950 (3 years)	Son of Hugh; co-king since birth	Bosonid / Carolingian	Adelaide of Italy	c. 930 – 22 November 950 (aged ~20) His reign was dominated by Berengar, who may have poisoned him
Non-contemporary	Berengar II; King of Italy	15 December 950 – August 961 (10 years and 8 months)	Grandson of Berengar I of Italy; crowned himself king after Hugh's death	Anscarid / Carolingian	Willa of Tuscany	c. 900 – 6 August 966 (aged ~66) De facto ruler since 945, ousted in 961 by Otto the Great after invading the Papal States
Non-contemporary	Adalbert; Co-King of Italy	15 December 950 – August 961 (10 years and 8 months)	Son and co-ruler of Berengar II	Anscarid / Carolingian	Gerberga	932/36 – 972/76 (aged ~40) Deposed alongside his father
Northern Italy is then absorbed into the Holy Roman Empire, see List of German monarchs. See also List of historical states of Italy.

Frankish kings in Burgundy
Portrait	King	Reign	Succession	House	Marriage(s)	Life details
—	Rudolph I King of Burgundy	January 888 – 25 October 912 (24 years and 9 months)	Proclaimed king in Saint-Maurice	Elder House of Welf	Guilla of Provence	Unknown – 25 October 912 Attempted to restore Middle Francia
—	Rudolph II; King of Burgundy; King of Italy (922–926)	25 October 912 – 12/13 July 937 (24 years, 9 months and 18/19 days)	Son of Rudolph I	Elder House of Welf	Bertha of Swabia	c. 880/885 – 12/13 January 937 (aged 51–56) Adquired Provence
	Conrad I King of Burgundy	12/13 July 937 – 19 October 993 (56 years, 3 months and 6/7 days)	Son of Rudolph II	Elder House of Welf	(1) Adelaide of Bellay (2) Matilda of France	c. 925 – 19 october 993 (aged ~68) One of the longest reigning monarchs
	Rudolph III; King of Burgundy	19 October 993 – 5/6 September 1032 (38 years, 10 months and 17/18 days)	Son of Conrad I	Elder House of Welf	(1) Agiltrud (2) Ermengarde	c. 970 – 5/6 September 1032 (aged ~62) Died childless and was forced to declare Emperor Conrad II as his heir
Burgundy is then absorbed into the Holy Roman Empire, see List of German monarchs

== Kings of all Franks (simplified) ==
- Clovis I (c. 509–511)
- Chlothar I (558–561)
- Chlothar II (613-629)
- Dagobert I (632–634)
- Chlothar III (662–663)
- Childeric II (673–675)
- Theuderic III (679–691)
- Clovis IV (691–695)
- Childebert IV (695–711)
- Dagobert III (711–715)
- Chilperic II (715–717, 719–721)
- Theuderic IV (721–737)
- Charles Martel (regent, 737–741)
- Childeric III (743–751)
- Pepin the Short (751–768)
- Charles the Great (771–814)
- Louis the Pious (814–840)
- Charles the Fat (885–887)

== Graphic lists ==
Successors of Clovis I (511–561)
	Soissons	Orléans	Paris	Austrasia
509–511	Clovis I (king of all Franks)			
511–524	Chlothar I (Soissons, 511–561) (sole king, 558-561)	Chlodomer (Orleans, 511–524)	Childebert I (Paris, 511–558)	Theuderic I (Austrasia, 511–534)
524–532	Chlothar I (Soissons, 511–561) (sole king, 558-561)		Childebert I (Paris, 511–558)	Theuderic I (Austrasia, 511–534)
532–534	Chlothar I (Soissons, 511–561) (sole king, 558-561)		Childebert I (Paris, 511–558)	Theuderic I (Austrasia, 511–534)
534–548	Chlothar I (Soissons, 511–561) (sole king, 558-561)		Childebert I (Paris, 511–558)	Theudebert I (Austrasia, 534–548)
548–555	Chlothar I (Soissons, 511–561) (sole king, 558-561)		Childebert I (Paris, 511–558)	Theudebald (Austrasia, 548–555)
555–558	Chlothar I (Soissons, 511–561) (sole king, 558-561)		Childebert I (Paris, 511–558)	
558–561				

Successors of Chlothar I (561–634)
	Neustria / Soissons	Orléans & Burgundy	Paris	Austrasia
561–567	Chilperic I (Neustria, 561–584) (Paris, 567–584)	Guntram (Orleans & Burgundy, 561–592)	Charibert I (Paris, 561–567)	Sigebert I (Austrasia, 561–575)
567–575	Chilperic I (Neustria, 561–584) (Paris, 567–584)	Guntram (Orleans & Burgundy, 561–592)	Paris divided	Sigebert I (Austrasia, 561–575)
575–584	Chilperic I (Neustria, 561–584) (Paris, 567–584)	Guntram (Orleans & Burgundy, 561–592)	Paris divided	Childebert II (Austrasia, 575–596) (Burgundy, 592–596)
584–592	Chlothar II (Neustria, 584–629) (sole king, 613-629)			Childebert II (Austrasia, 575–596) (Burgundy, 592–596)
592–596	Chlothar II (Neustria, 584–629) (sole king, 613-629)			Childebert II (Austrasia, 575–596) (Burgundy, 592–596)
596–612	Chlothar II (Neustria, 584–629) (sole king, 613-629)	Theuderic II (Burgundy, 596–613)		Theudebert II (Austrasia, 596–612)
612–613	Chlothar II (Neustria, 584–629) (sole king, 613-629)	Theuderic II (Burgundy, 596–613)		
613	Chlothar II (Neustria, 584–629) (sole king, 613-629)	Sigebert II (Austrasia & Burgundy, 613)		
613–622	Chlothar II (Neustria, 584–629) (sole king, 613-629)			
623–629	Chlothar II (Neustria, 584–629) (sole king, 613-629)			Dagobert I (Austrasia, 623–634) (Neustria, 629–639) (sole king, 632-634)
629–632			Aquitaine	Dagobert I (Austrasia, 623–634) (Neustria, 629–639) (sole king, 632-634)
629–632			Charibert II (Aquitaine, 629–632)	Dagobert I (Austrasia, 623–634) (Neustria, 629–639) (sole king, 632-634)
632–634				Dagobert I (Austrasia, 623–634) (Neustria, 629–639) (sole king, 632-634)

Successors of Dagobert I (634–751)
	Neustria & Burgundy	Austrasia
634–639	Dagobert I (former king of all Franks, 632-634) (king of Neustria, 629–639)	Sigebert III (king of Austrasia, 634–656); Mayor of the palace: Adalgisel; Pepin I; Otto; Grimoald I
639–656	Clovis II (639–657); Mayors: Aega; Erchinoald in Neustria; Flaochad; Radobertus in Burgundy	Sigebert III (king of Austrasia, 634–656); Mayor of the palace: Adalgisel; Pepin I; Otto; Grimoald I
656–657	Clovis II (639–657); Mayors: Aega; Erchinoald in Neustria; Flaochad; Radobertus in Burgundy	Childebert III the Adopted (656–662); Mayor of the palace: Grimoald I
657–658	Chlothar III (657–673); Mayor of the palace: Ebroin	Childebert III the Adopted (656–662); Mayor of the palace: Grimoald I
658–662	Chlothar III (657–673); Mayor of the palace: Ebroin	Childebert III the Adopted (656–662); Mayor of the palace: Grimoald I
662–663		
663–673		Childeric II (663–675); Mayor of the palace: Wulfoald
673	Theuderic III; Mayor of the palace: Ebroin	Childeric II (663–675); Mayor of the palace: Wulfoald
673–675		Childeric II (663–675); Mayor of the palace: Wulfoald
675–676	Theuderic III (restored); Mayors: Leudesius (675); Ebroin (675–680); Waratton (681); Gistemar (682); Waratton (682–685); Berchar (686); Nordebert (687–695)	Clovis III; Mayor of the palace: Wulfoald
676–679	Theuderic III (restored); Mayors: Leudesius (675); Ebroin (675–680); Waratton (681); Gistemar (682); Waratton (682–685); Berchar (686); Nordebert (687–695)	Dagobert II; Mayor of the palace: Wulfoald
679–691	(king of all Franks; 679–691)	Mayor of the palace: Pepin II (680–714)
691–695	Clovis IV (691-695)	
691–695	Mayor: Nordebert	Mayor: Pepin II
695–711	Childebert IV (695-711)	
695–711	Mayors: Grimoald II in Neustria; Drogo in Burgundy	Mayor: Pepin II
711–715	Dagobert III (711-715)	
711–715	Mayors: Grimoald II (695–714); Theudoald (714–715)	Mayor: Pepin II (679–714); Theudoald (714–-716)
715–717	Chilperic II (715-721)	
715–717	Mayor: Ragenfrid (715–719)	Mayor: Theudoald (714–716)
717–719		Chlothar IV (rival king in Austrasia, 717–719); Mayor: Charles Martel (717–741)
719–721	Mayor: Charles Martel (719–741)	
721–737	Theuderic IV (721-737); Mayor: Charles Martel (719–741)	
737–743	Interregnum; Mayor: Charles Martel (719–741)	
737–743	Mayor: Pepin the Short (741–751)	Mayor: Carloman (741–747)
743–751	Childeric III (743-751)	
743–751	Mayor: Pepin the Short (741–751)	Mayor: Carloman (741–747)

Successors of Louis I (840–987)
Map	Aquitaine	West Francia	Middle Francia	Provence	Italy	Bavaria / Lorraine	East Francia
	Louis I the Pious; Emperor and King of the Franks (814–840)						
	Pepin I (817–838)				Lothair I King of Italy (818–840)	Louis II the German; King of Bavaria (817–840)	
	Pepin II (838–864) rival king Charles the Child (855–866)				Lothair I King of Italy (818–840)	Louis II the German; King of Bavaria (817–840)	
	Pepin II (838–864) rival king Charles the Child (855–866)	Civil war between Louis I's sons (840–843); see Carolingian civil war					
	Pepin II (838–864) rival king Charles the Child (855–866)	Charles II the Bald (843–877); West Francia	Lothair I Emperor and King of Italy (840–855)			Louis II the German (843–876); King of East Francia	
	Pepin II (838–864) rival king Charles the Child (855–866)	Charles II the Bald (843–877); West Francia	Lothair II of Lotharingia (855–869); King of Lotharingia	Charles of Provence (855–863)	Louis II of Italy; Emperor of the Romans and King of Italy (855–875)	Louis II the German (843–876); King of East Francia	
	Pepin II (838–864) rival king Charles the Child (855–866)	Charles II the Bald (843–877); West Francia	Lothair II of Lotharingia (855–869); King of Lotharingia	Lothair II and Louis of Italy	Louis II of Italy; Emperor of the Romans and King of Italy (855–875)	Louis II the German (843–876); King of East Francia	
	Louis II the Stammerer (866–877)	Charles II the Bald (843–877); West Francia	Charles II and Louis the German	Louis II of Italy; Emperor and King of Italy (855–875)		Louis II the German (843–876); King of East Francia	
	Louis II the Stammerer (866–877)	Charles II the Bald; Emperor (875–877), King of Italy (875–877) and King of West Francia (843–877)				Carloman of Bavaria (876–80)	Louis III the Saxon; King of Saxony (876–882) Charles III the Fat; King of Alemannia (876–882)
	Louis II the Stammerer; King of West Francia (877–879) and Aquitaine (866–877)				Carloman of Bavaria; King of Bavaria (876–880) and Italy (877–880)		Louis III the Saxon; King of Saxony (876–882) Charles III the Fat; King of Alemannia (876–882)
	Louis III (879–882); Carloman II (879–884); Kings of West Francia			Boso (husb. Ermengard, dau. Louis II of Italy) (879–887)	Charles III the Fat; King of Alemannia (876–882); King of Italy (880–887)	Louis III the Saxon; King of Saxony (876–882); King of Bavaria (880–882)	Charles III the Fat; King of Alem. (876–882); King of Italy (880–887)
	Charles III the Fat; Emperor (881–887); King of West Francia (884–887)			Boso (husb. Ermengard, dau. Louis II of Italy) (879–887)	Charles III the Fat; Emperor (881–887); King of East Francia (876–887) and Italy (880–887)		
AD 888	Eudes (nephew of Ermengarde of Tours, wife of Lothair I) (888–898)		Rudolph I (husb. Willa, dau. Boso); King of Burgundy (888–912) (Rudolphins)	Louis III the Blind (887–933)	Berengar I (son of Gisela, dau. Louis II the German) (887–889)	Arnulf of Carinthia; King of East Francia (887–899); King of Lotharingia (887–894)	
AD 888	Eudes (nephew of Ermengarde of Tours, wife of Lothair I) (888–898)		Rudolph I (husb. Willa, dau. Boso); King of Burgundy (888–912) (Rudolphins)	Louis III the Blind (887–933)	Guy III (grandson of Adelaide, sister of Bernard of Italy) (889–894) Lambert (891–895)	Arnulf of Carinthia; King of East Francia (887–899); King of Lotharingia (887–894)	
AD 888	Eudes (nephew of Ermengarde of Tours, wife of Lothair I) (888–898)		Rudolph I (husb. Willa, dau. Boso); King of Burgundy (888–912) (Rudolphins)	Louis III the Blind (887–933)	Arnulf; Emperor (896–899); King of Italy (895–899)	Zwentibold; King of Lotharingia (894–900)	Arnulf (887–899)
AD 898	Charles III the Simple; King of West Francia (898–922); King of Lotharingia (911–922)		Rudolph I (husb. Willa, dau. Boso); King of Burgundy (888–912) (Rudolphins)	Louis III the Blind (887–933)	Arnulf; Emperor (896–899); King of Italy (895–899)	Zwentibold; King of Lotharingia (894–900)	Arnulf (887–899)
AD 898	Charles III the Simple; King of West Francia (898–922); King of Lotharingia (911–922)		Rudolph I (husb. Willa, dau. Boso); King of Burgundy (888–912) (Rudolphins)	Louis III the Blind (887–933)	Berengar, Emperor (915–24); Lambert, (896–898); Louis III, Emperor (901–905); Rudolf II (922–926) and Hugh (926)	Louis IV the Child; King of East Francia (899–911); King of Lotharingia (900–911)	
AD 915	Charles III the Simple; King of West Francia (898–922); King of Lotharingia (911–922)		Rudolph II (912–937)	Louis III the Blind (887–933)	Berengar, Emperor (915–24); Lambert, (896–898); Louis III, Emperor (901–905); Rudolf II (922–926) and Hugh (926)	Charles III the Simple; King of Lotharingia (911–922)	Conrad I (son-in-law of Gisela, dau. Louis II the German) (911–918)
AD 915	Robert I (full brother of Eudes) (922–923)		Rudolph II of Burgundy; King of Burgundy & Provence (933–937)		Hugh of Italy (son of Bertha, dau. Lothair II of Lotharingia) (926–947)	Henry I the Fowler (nephew of Liutgard of Saxony, wife of Louis the Saxon) (911–918); King of Germany (918–936)	
AD 915	Rudolph (nephew of Richilde of Provence, wife of Charles the Bald) (923–936)		Rudolph II of Burgundy; King of Burgundy & Provence (933–937)		Hugh of Italy (son of Bertha, dau. Lothair II of Lotharingia) (926–947)	Henry I the Fowler (nephew of Liutgard of Saxony, wife of Louis the Saxon) (911–918); King of Germany (918–936)	
AD 915	Rudolph (nephew of Richilde of Provence, wife of Charles the Bald) (923–936)		Rudolph II of Burgundy; King of Burgundy & Provence (933–937)		Hugh of Italy (son of Bertha, dau. Lothair II of Lotharingia) (926–947)	Otto I the Great; King of Germany (936–973)	
AD 947	Louis IV Transmarinus (936–954)		Conrad I of Burgundy (937–993) Rudolph III of Burgundy (993–1032)		Lothair II of Italy (947–950)	Otto I the Great; King of Germany (936–973)	
AD 947	Lothair (954–986)		Conrad I of Burgundy (937–993) Rudolph III of Burgundy (993–1032)		Berengar II (son of Gisela, dau. Berengar I) (950–961) Adalbert (950–963)	Otto I the Great; King of Germany (936–973)	
	Louis V the Do-Nothing (986–987)		Conrad I of Burgundy (937–993) Rudolph III of Burgundy (993–1032)		Otto I the Great husband of Adelaide of Italy, widow of Berengar II and daughter of Rudolph II of Burgundy; Emperor (962–973), king of Italy (961–973) and Germany (936–973): Ottonian dynasty -		
	Hugh Capet (987–996): Capetian dynasty -		Conrad I of Burgundy (937–993) Rudolph III of Burgundy (993–1032)		Otto I the Great husband of Adelaide of Italy, widow of Berengar II and daughter of Rudolph II of Burgundy; Emperor (962–973), king of Italy (961–973) and Germany (936–973): Ottonian dynasty -		
	List of French monarchs		List of German monarchs				
