= Ansbert (6th century) =

Gallo-Roman senator

Ansbert the Senator
- Senator
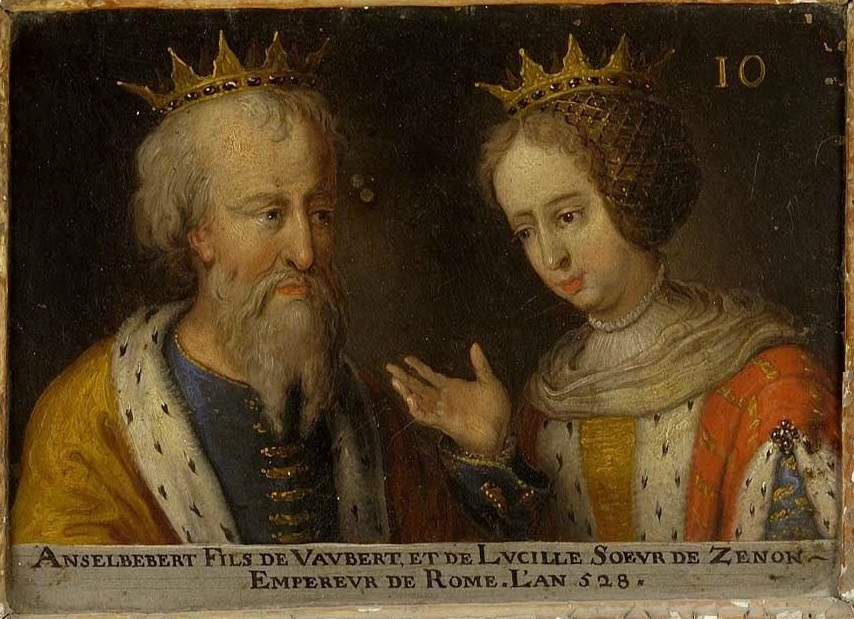
- Born: Ansbert (or Anselbert); Roman Gaul
- Died: Kingdom of Austrasia, Francia
- Spouse: Blithilde

Ansbert (Latin: Ansbertus, etc.) was a Frankish Austrasian noble, and a Gallo-Roman senator. He is thought to be the son of Ferreolus, Senator of Narbonne and his wife, Dode. If so, he was the great-grandson of Tonantius Ferreolus, Praetorian Prefect of Gaul and his wife Papianilla.

He might be a semi-legendary figure, a "faux mérovingien". His wife Blithilde was reputed to be a daughter of Charibert I (who reigned 561–567), Merovingian King of Paris, and granddaughter of Chlothar I.

== Descendants ==
The Liber Historiae Francorum, written centuries later, states that he married Blithilde, a daughter of King Hlothar and then continues the line to the Pippinids through his son Arnoald to Arnulf of Metz, one of the progenitors of the Carolingians. William of Malmesbury in his History of the Kings of England, repeats the line, without naming his source. While some versions of the relationship identify "King Hlothar" as the "father of Dagobert" and hence Clothar II, a 9th-century genealogy and some modern reconstructions posit that Ansbertus' wife was a daughter of Clothar I, making her the offspring of his brief relationship with Waldrada. However, Gregory of Tours, writing contemporary to the sons of Clothar I and the main source on the early Merovingians, does not ascribe to Waldrada any children by her brief relationship with Chlothar.

The following children are attributed to Ansbertus and Blithilde:

- Arnoald, Bishop of Metz
- Munderic, Bishop of Arisitum
- Tarsicius or Tarsice.

== Sources ==
- "Europe after Rome : a new cultural history 500-1000", by Julia M H Smith, Oxford University Press 2005 : "The Carolingian dynasty...appropriated the Roman past into its ancestry by a genealogy that claimed that its sainted (and historically attested) founder, Arnulf of Metz (d.c. 643) was the grandson of the (mythical) Merovingian princess Blithild and her (equally mythical) husband Ansbert, hailed as a Roman senator."
- Weis, Frederick Lewis Ancestral Roots of Certain American Colonist Who Came To America Before 1700 (7th ed.), lines 180 (all) & 190-9
- New England Historic and Genealogical Register 101:112
- Christian Settipani, Les Ancêtres de Charlemagne (France: Éditions Christian, 1989).
- Christian Settipani, Continuite Gentilice et Continuite Familiale Dans Les Familles Senatoriales Romaines A L'epoque Imperiale, Mythe et Realite, Addenda I-III (juillet 2000-octobre 2002) (n.p.: Prosopographica et Genealogica, 2002).
