= Arnoald =

7th-century Bishop of Metz

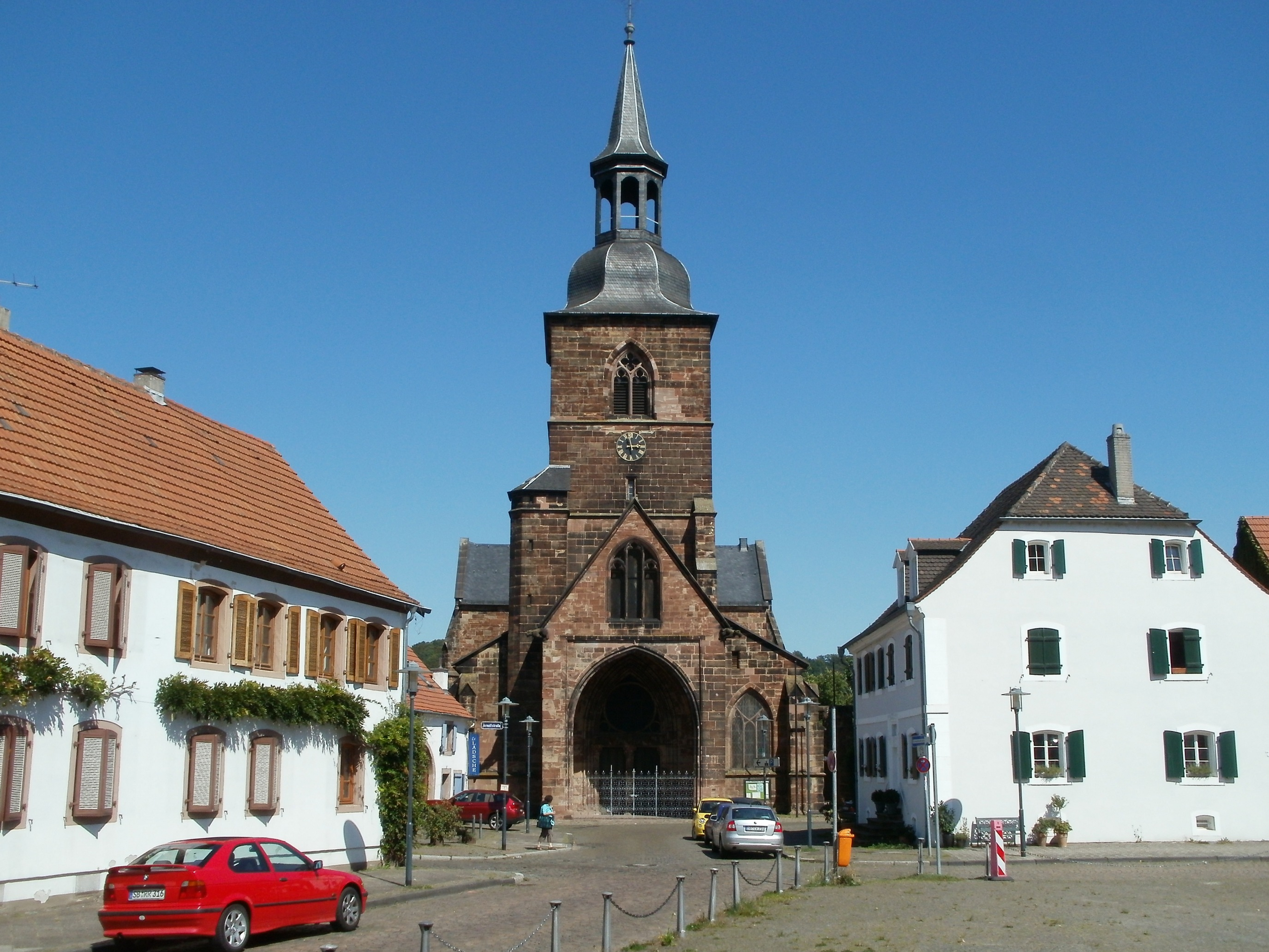
Stiftskirche St. Arnual

Arnoald, also called Arnoldus or Arnual (c. 540/560 – c. 611), was a Bishop of Metz between 601 and 609 or 611, the successor of his uncle Agilulf. He was the son of Ansbertus, a senator, and his wife Blithilde, whose parents were Charibert I and Ingoberga.

== Life ==
Virtually no information survives concerning the acts of Arnoald prior to his becoming Bishop of Metz or during his occupation of the episcopal seat. From Paul the Deacon we learn that he was Roman and of senatorial extraction suggesting that he came from one of the families in southern Gaul whose members had held senatorial rank during the empire.

The Commemoratio Genealogiae Domni Karoli Glorissimi Imperatoris, clearly incorrect in some respects (see below), suggests strongly that Arnoald was one of the Ferreoli, a family dating from the 4th century who were based in the Midi but appear to have switched their loyalties from the Visigothic Kingdom to the Frankish Kingdom of Austrasia with its capital at Metz during the two decades following the Battle of Vouillé in 507. Modern arguments have been made that this relationship was invented by contemporaries to give the Carolingians a Roman pedigree. However this is unlikely to have been the case inasmuch as (a) the Ferreoli, though significant, were far from the most prominent senatorial family in Gaul and (b) it would have been too easy for the Carolingians to obtain whatever Roman bloodline by marrying into remnants of those families.

Still the interest taken by the Austrasians in the Ferreoli is enigmatic and significant and may have to do with their potential use in a conquest of Visigothic Septimania. Several members of the family were elevated to the rank of Patrician (senior Roman official) of Provence during the 6th century. Arnoald's acquisition of the bishopric of Metz is unsurprising inasmuch as his uncle Agilulf had held it. The reason Agilulf was granted the position is more obscure. There do not appear to be any predecessors of this family in the bishopric of Metz which prior to 590 was not important enough to warrant a single mention from Gregory of Tours. Prior to Agilulf, the most powerful bishops in the Austrasian kingdom were Egidius of Rheims and Gregory of Tours.

Egidius was convicted of treason in 590 and the rise of the Bishops of Metz from that time certainly is in part due to those events. Even after these events, Metz cannot truly be said to have become the most powerful bishopric until the time of Arnulf. It is of some interest that the name of the diplomatically adept deacon of Gregory of Tours in 590 was also an Agilulf.

== Relation to St. Arnulf of Metz ==
The Commemoratio Genealogiae Domni Karoli Glorissimi Imperatoris written originally in the early 9th century states that Arnulf of Metz was the son of predecessor Arnoaldus of Metz, himself a son of Ansbertus and thus belonging to the Ferreoli of the Midi. Joseph Depoin observed that chronologically and for other reasons - Arnulf was identified as a Frank in contemporary documents whereas Arnoald was identified by Paul the Deacon as a Roman ex nobilia senatorum familia orto - this construction was incorrect and proposed an alternative to the effect that Arnulf's father was Bodegisel, based in significant part on the Vita Gundolphi. David H. Kelley then proposed that Arnoaldus was likely an ancestor of the Carolingians through a daughter Itta, wife of Pepin of Landen. Christian Settipani carefully revisited and expanded upon the work of Depoin and Kelley. He concurred in Arnulf's descent from Bodegisel instead of Arnoald, and that there was a connection between the Ripuarian Frankish royal house and the Carolingians but argued (without dismissing the possibility of Itta's being Arnoald's daughter) that there was a connection through Arnulf's wife, Doda who he posited as a daughter of Arnoald. Kelly considered Settipani's proposed connection between the Carolingians and Arnoald and regarded it as probable.

== References and citations ==
- Christian Settipani, Les Ancêtres de Charlemagne (France: Éditions Christian, 1989).
- Christian Settipani, Continuite Gentilice et Continuite Familiale Dans Les Familles Senatoriales Romaines A L'epoque Imperiale, Mythe et Realite, Addenda I - III (juillet 2000- octobre 2002) (n.p.: Prosopographica et Genealogica, 2002).
- Various Monumenta Germaniae Historica (Leipzig: Verlag Karl W. Hiersemann, 1923–1925).
- David Humiston Kelley, "A New Consideration of the Carolingians," The New England Historical and Genealogical Register, vol. 101 (1947)
- Onomastique et Parenté dans l'Occident médiéval, 2000, Settipani and K.S.B. Keats-Rohan, editors
- Depoin, J., "Grandes figures monacales des temps mérovingiens: saint Arnoul de Metz. Études de critique historique", Revue Mabillon, 1921, p. 245-258, et 1922, p. 13-25.

Specific
