= Herbert of Toulouse =

- Issue: Cunigunda of Laon Sénégonde

Herbert of Toulouse was a 9th-century count, and possibly the father of Cunigunda of Laon.

== Life ==
Herbert is mentioned for the first time on December 14, 804 in the charter of foundation of the abbey of Saint-Guilhem-le-Désert with his father Guillaume de Gellone, and in the company of his brothers Bernard, Guitcaire, Gaucelme and his uncles Theudouin, Thierry and Alleaume. In 819, Louis the Pious, who had become emperor in 814, married Judith of Bavaria, despite the fact that he had three sons from his first marriage. The sons of Guillaume are grouped among the ones supporting of Judith. It has also been theorised that Emma of Bavaria, Judith's sister, was married in her first marriage to Thierry, son of Guillaume of Gellone. A conflict occurs in August 829, when Louis the Pious decided, at the Worms assembly, to constitute a kingdom for his son Charles, born of Judith. Louis faced the displayed discontent of his eldest son Lothaire, whom he exiled to Italy, as well as from his advisor, Wala de Corbie. Wala decided to spread a rumor of an adulterous union between Judith and Bernard, Herbert's brother, and accused Bernard of taking advantage of the emperor's weakness to govern in his place. Taking advantage of Louis the Pious expedition in Brittany, his sons Pepin and Louis organized a revolt, and they brought Lothair back from Italy and they took power. Bernard of Septimanie fled to Barcelona, while Herbert was blinded.

== Possible descendants ==
No contemporary documents mentions Herbert having any children. Christian Settipani made two hypotheses where he theorised that Herbert had two daughters:

- He notices that the wife of King Bernard of Italy is called Cunigonda and that their grandson is called Herbert and brings these first names closer to the Guilhelmides, specifying that chronologically, Cunigonda, the wife of Bernard of Italy could be Herbert's daughter.
- He also notices that the first generations of the Raymondine house (counts of Toulouse) bear the names Bernard and Herbert. He proposes that Sénégonde, the mother of Counts Frédolon and Raymond I is a daughter of Herbert.
