= Erlebert =

Erlebert (b. after 600), Seigneur of Quernes, son of Charibert de Haspengau and his wife Wulfgurd. The only facts known about Erlebert are that he was from a noble family that included his more famous brother Robert I, Bishop of Tours.

The name of Erlebert’s wife is unknown, and they had at least one child:

- Lambert, Abbot of Fontenelle and Bishop of Lyon

Erlebert was part of the family of Robertians.

== Sources ==
- Settipani, Christian, Les Ancêtres de Charlemagne, 2e édition revue et corrigée, éd. P & G, Prosopographia et Genealogica, 2015,
- Settipani, Christian. ''Addenda aux Ancêtres de Charlemagne'', 1990
- Europäische Stammtafeln (available on-line)
- Jean Baptiste François Hennebert, chanoine de la cathédrale de Saint-Omer, Histoire générale de la province d'Artois dédié à Mgr comte d'Artois, t. I, Librairie Veuve Henri, Lille, 1786.
