= Bertha of Kent =

Queen consort of Kent (c. 565–c. 601)

Bertha
- Queen consort of Kent
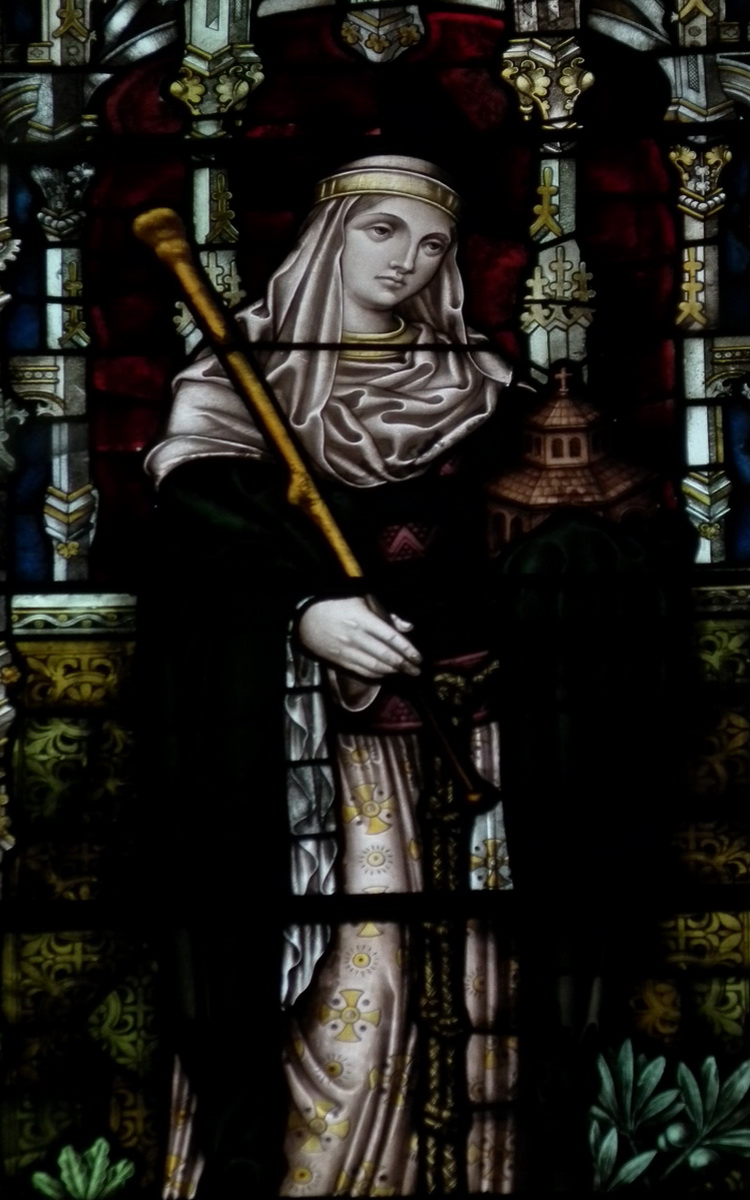
- Bertha of Kent: Stained glass window in the chapter house of Canterbury Cathedral, England
- Born: c. 565
- Died: c. 601
- Spouse: Æthelberht of Kent
- Issue: Eadbald of Kent; Æthelburg of Kent; Æðelwald
- Dynasty: Merovingian
- Father: Charibert I
- Mother: Ingoberga
- Religion: Chalcedonian Christianity

Bertha or Aldeberge (c. 565– d. in or after 601) was a Frankish princess who became queen of Kent. She enabled the 597 Gregorian mission, led by Augustine, which resulted in the conversion to Christianity of Anglo-Saxon England.

== Life ==
Bertha was a Frankish princess, the daughter of Charibert I and his wife Ingoberga, granddaughter of the reigning King Chlothar I and great-granddaughter of Clovis I and Clotilde. Her father died in 567, her mother in 589. Bertha had been raised near Tours. Her marriage to the pagan Æthelberht of Kent, in 580, was on condition that she be allowed to practise her religion. She brought her chaplain, Liudhard, with her to England. A former Roman church was restored for Bertha just outside Canterbury and dedicated to Martin of Tours. It was the private chapel of Queen Bertha before Augustine arrived from Rome. The present St Martin's Church, Canterbury continues on the same site, incorporating Roman walling of the original church in the chancel. It is acknowledged by UNESCO as the oldest church in the English-speaking world where Christian worship has taken place continuously since 580. St Martin's (with Canterbury Cathedral and St Augustine's Abbey) make up Canterbury's UNESCO World Heritage Site.

Pope Gregory I requested that Bertha convert her husband to Christianity and upbraided her for not doing so. When Gregory decided to send a mission led by Augustine to restore Christianity to England in 596, the Pope requested that Bertha incline her husband's heart to give a favourable reception. Augustine was supposed to move on but upon arrival in 597 he decided to found the Abbey of St Peter and Paul on land granted by Æthelberht. Without her support and Æthelberht's good will, monastic settlements and the cathedral would likely have been developed elsewhere. In 601, Pope Gregory addressed a letter to Bertha, in which he complimented her highly on her faith and knowledge of letters.

Anglo-Saxon records indicate that Bertha had two children: Eadbald of Kent and Æthelburg of Kent. She is named in the genealogies of various of the medieval accounts of the 'Kentish Royal Legend'.

The date of her death (possibly 606) is disputed.

== Legacy ==
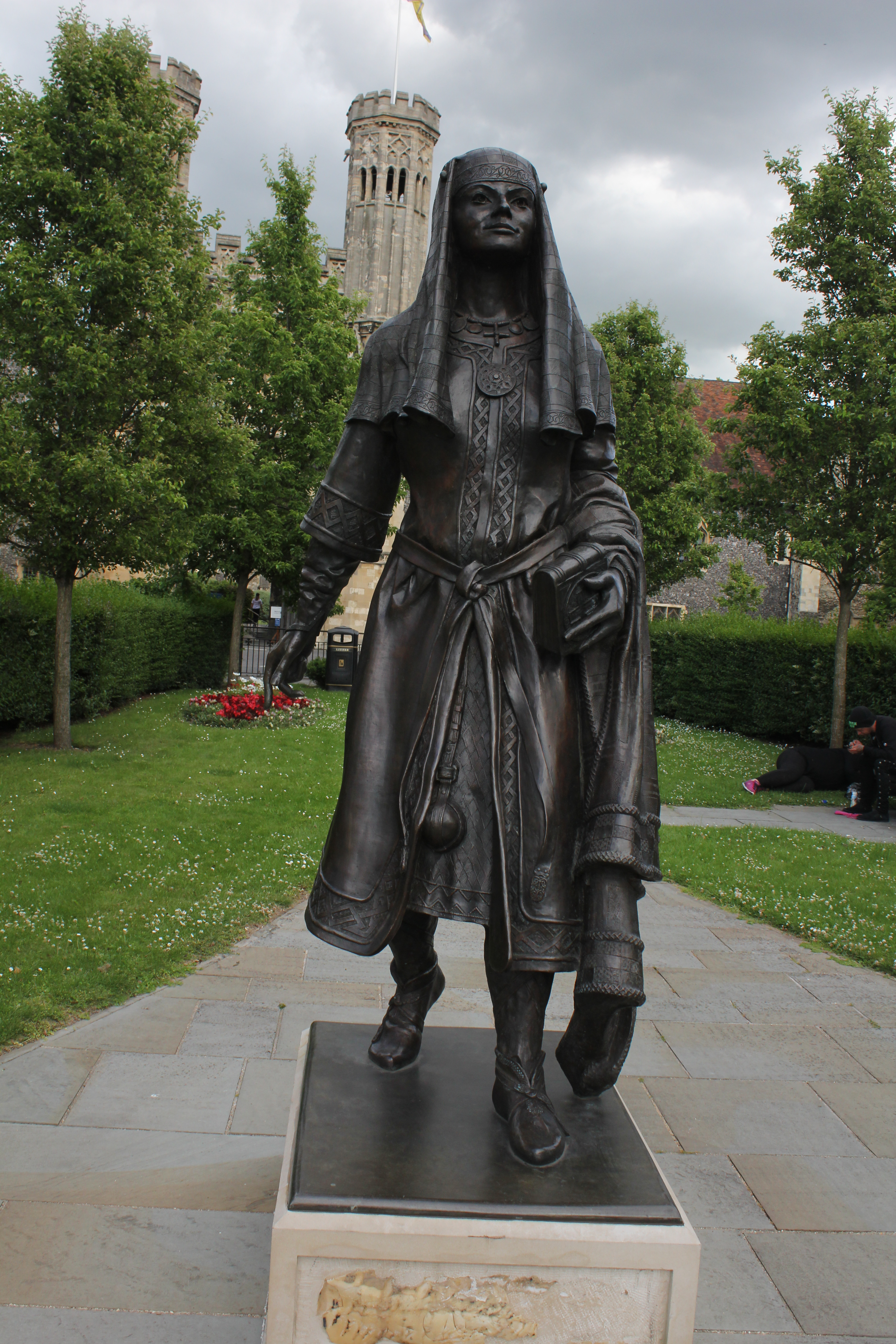
Queen Bertha statue, Lady Wootton's Green, Canterbury

One could say that Bertha’s legacy was the conversion of much of England to Christianity, as her prayers paved the way for the Augustinian mission. Today, the City of Canterbury celebrates Queen Bertha in several ways.

- The Bertha trail, consisting of 14 bronze plaques set in pavements, runs from the Buttermarket to St Martin's Church via Lady Wootton's Green.
- In 2006, bronze statues of Bertha and Æthelberht by Stephen Melton were installed on Lady Wootton's Green as part of the Canterbury Commemoration Society's "Ethelbert and Bertha" project.

There is a wooden statue of Bertha in St Martin's Church.

Images of St Martin's Church, Canterbury, Kent, England

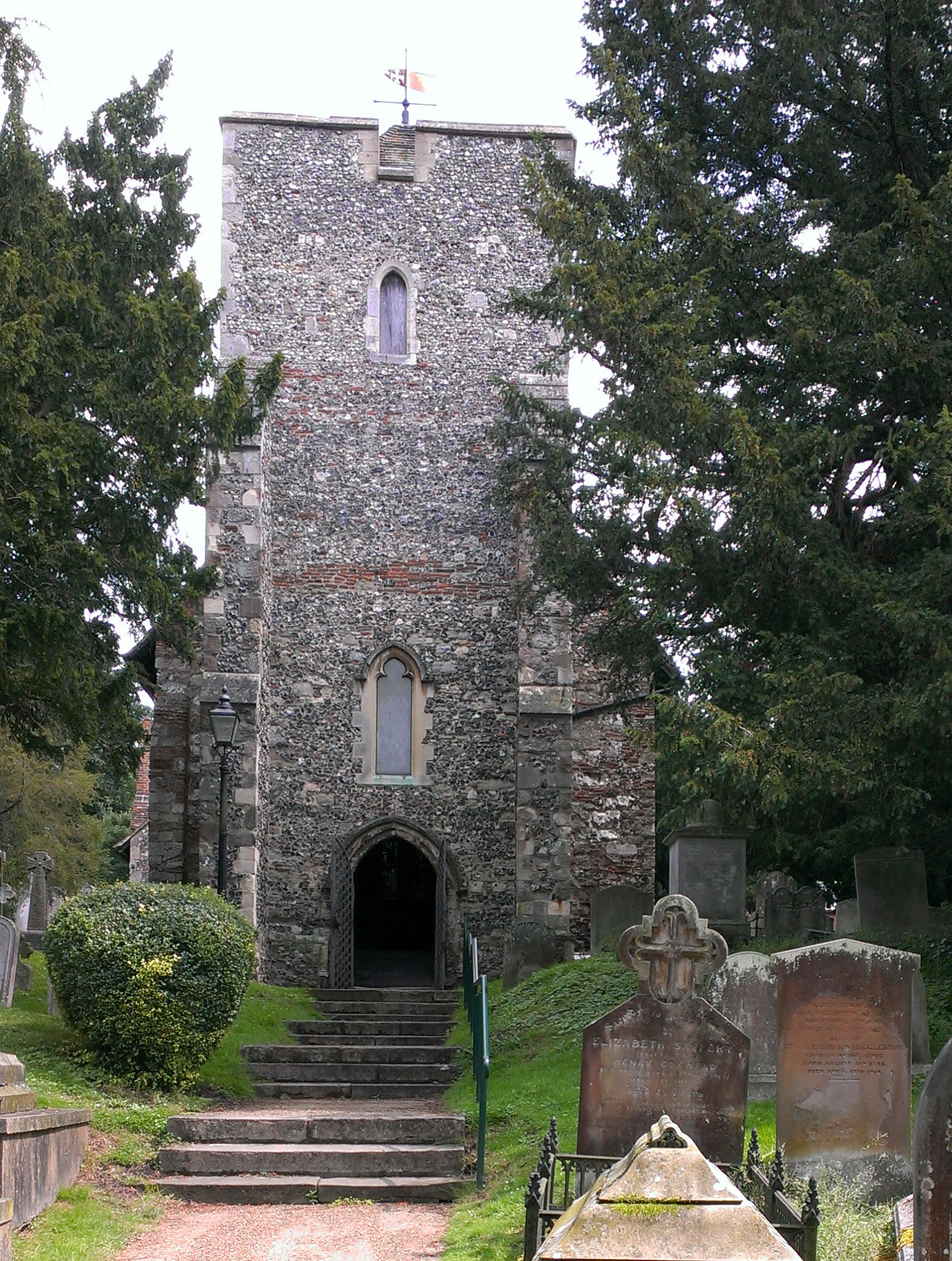
West elevation

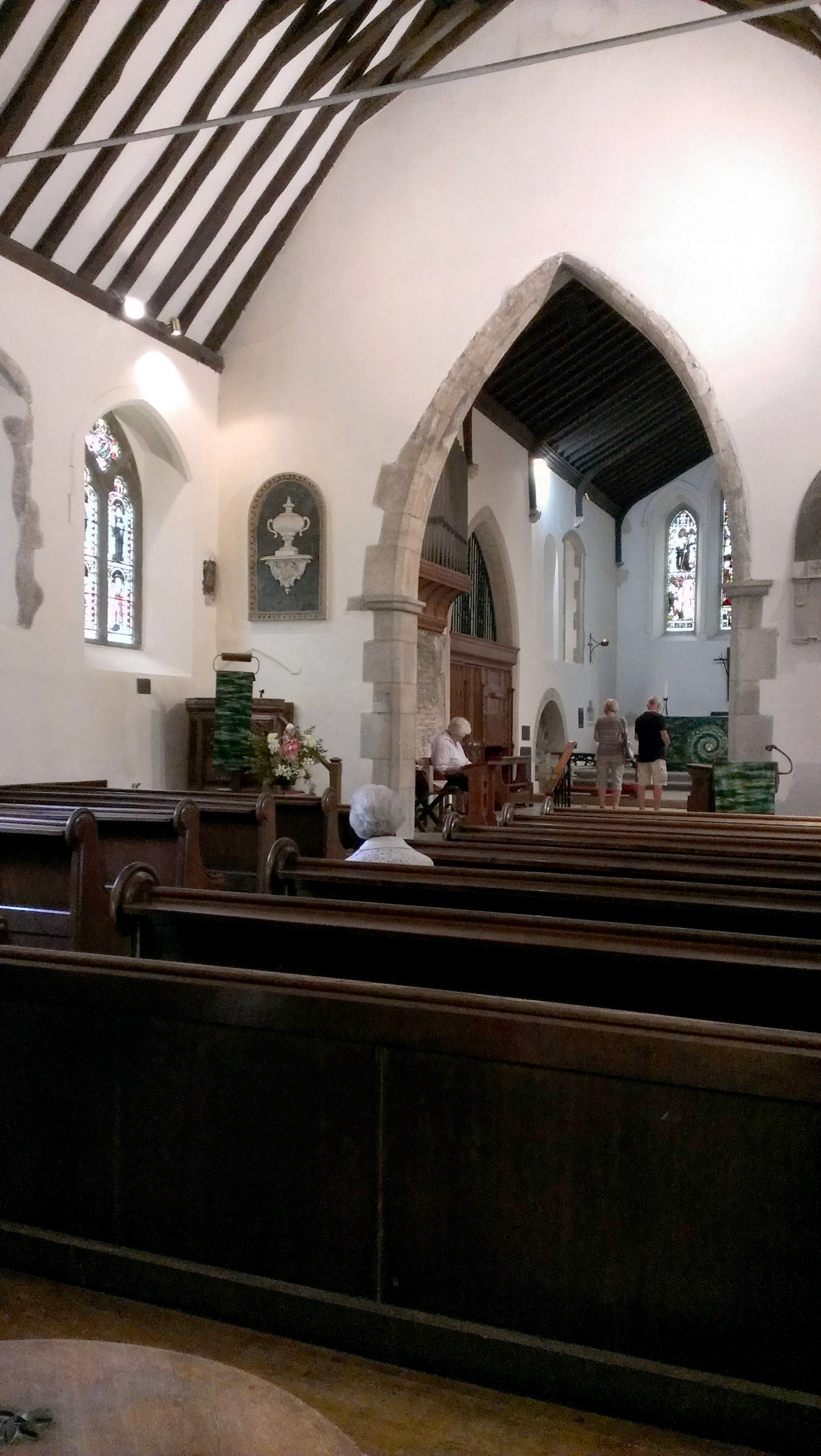
Interior view

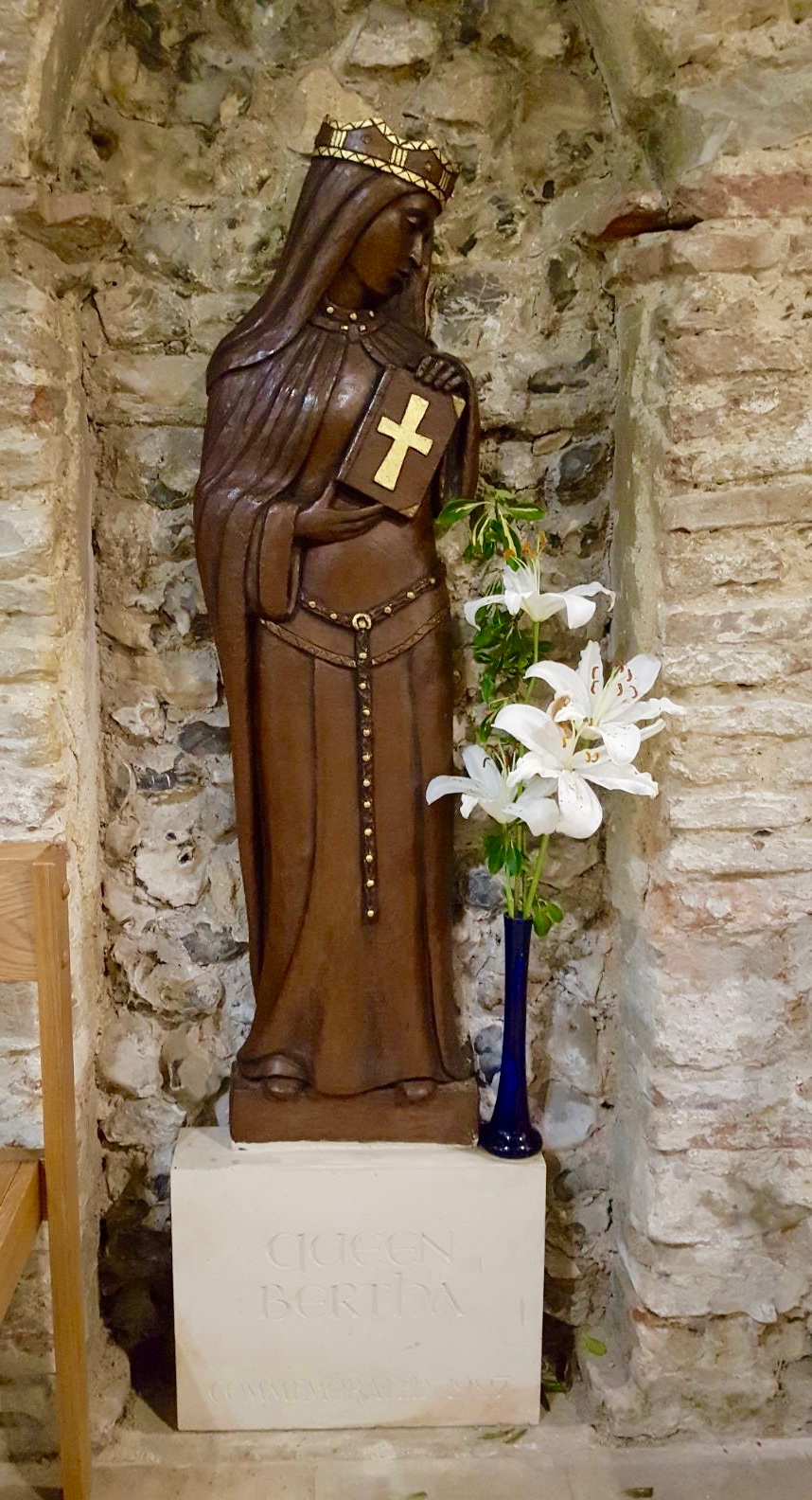
St Bertha wooden statue, south wall of the church
