= Cunigunda of Laon =

Wife of Bernard, King of Italy

- Spouse: Bernhard of Italy
- Issue: Pepin I, Count of Vermandois

Cunigunda of Laon was a 9th-century woman.

== Life ==
Cunigunda's origin is not known, but Settipani suggests that she might have been a daughter of Herbert of Toulouse. Settipani's theory is part of a more extensive reconstruction whereby Herbert might have been a son of Guillaume de Gellone and Cunégonde. Settipani's theory suggests that Cunigunda was named for her grandmother.

Another theory suggests Cunigunda was the daughter of Adelgis, Count of Parma. Fredrick Lewis Weis presents this theory in his book Ancestral Roots of Certain American Colonists, 7th Edition. No concrete evidence exists for either theory.

Cunigunda married Bernhard of Italy before 817. Her age at the time of the marriage is not known. It is possible that the marriage took place sometime after Bernhard was confirmed as the king of Italy, and that the age of Bernhard is the reason his son was born so late after his coronation.

Cunigunda's only known child was born in 817, named Pepin, who became Count of Vermandois.

A year after her son's birth, her husband was blinded on the orders of Louis the Pious, a procedure that killed him.

Nothing is known of Cunigunda's life after her husband's death. She died after 18 June 835, as the date of an act of the monastery of San Alessandro reveals, where it names her as still alive at the time.

== See also ==
- Kingdom of Italy (Holy Roman Empire)
- Carolingian dynasty
- Pepin of Italy
