= Blavia castellum =

Roman military fort in France

Blavia castellum was a military fort built by the Romans in the Aquitanian period of the Tractatus Armoricani, an ancient and literary name for the northwest part of France, especially Brittany. The fort is referenced in the death of Charibert I. History puts the fort in existence during the Merovingian empire in modern day France.
