= Munderic of Arisitum =

Saint Munderic of Arisitum was a Coadjutor at the Diocese of Langres between 539 and 572 and later a Bishop of Arisitum circa 600. He was a son of Ansbertus, a senator, and wife Blithilde.

Monderic had originally been consecrated as a coadjutor for Bishop Tetricus of Langres, who had suffered a stroke. The understanding, however, was that he would serve as Archpriest of Tonnerre in the diocese of Langres, until Bishop Tetricus died. But in the war between King Guntram and King Sigibert, Monderic had given gifts and furnished supplies for Sigibert, and so he was sent into exile super ripam Rhodani in turri quadam arcta atque detecta, ('by the bank of the Rhone in a certain small tower that had lost its roof') in which he was held for two years cum grandi cruciatu ('with great discomfort'). Archbishop Nicetius, who was the bishop of Lyon and Metropolitan of the diocese of Langres, intervened on his behalf and sheltered him in Lyon for two months. Unable to get his original place restored, Monderic fled to King Sigibert. About 570, Sigebert, King of Austrasia, created a see at Arisitum for Munderic, taking fifteen parishes and the village of Arisitum, which had once belonged to the Goths but at the time was in the diocese Bishop Dalmatius of Rodez.

== Sources ==
- Douglas J. Potter The Catholic Encyclopedia, I-XIV (New York: Robert Appleton Company, 1908–1912).
