= Charibert of Hesbaye =

European Frankish nobleman

Charibert de Haspengau (c. 555–636) was a Frankish nobleman, possibly a comes. The identity of his parents is uncertain, though he is believed by some to be the son of King Charibert I of Paris. Charibert is described as Charibert nobilis in Neustria. No other information is available other than descriptions of his grandchildren (e.g., Lambertus, Bishop of Lyon), who are described as having "high rank and worthy of significant positions" within the palace.

Charibert married Wulfgurd of Hesbaye of unknown parentage. They had four children:

- Robert I, Bishop of Tours
- Aldebert, a monk, possibly at Fontenelle Abbey
- Erlebert, Seigneur de Quernes
- A daughter, whose name is unknown.
