= Monastery of Belcinac =

Monastery in Seine-Maritime, France

Belcinac Monastery was founded in the second half of the 7th century by Saint Condède, a monk of Fontenelle Abbey. Condède was a disciple of Lambert, Bishop of Lyon, and was known as the hermit of England. The monastery was built on an island in the river Seine in France, called Belcinac in ancient texts. The island, which sank in 1330, was donated by Theuderic III, King of Neustria, and son of Clovis II and Balthild. Saint Condède had built three small churches dedicated to the Blessed Virgin, Saint Peter, and Saint Valérie.

This island, located on the Seine opposite Villequier and downstream from Caudebec-en-Caux, was referred to as lutum (lotus) in the donation charter. The island and the neighboring Celtic houses were called "the island of Lot." In the 7th century, the island was approximately three miles long and five hundred yards wide and had often been partially submerged. In 1330, the island was submerged, then reappeared a few years later. However, the monastery had entirely disappeared, carried away by the waves. The island disappeared again in 1597, only to reappear in 1641. It disappeared for good in 1740, and is now lost in the water meadows of Vatteville.

== Sources ==
- A Historical essay on the life and the monastery of St. Condède and the strange disappearance of an island in the Seine, Caudebec-en-Caux, 1938.
- Parker, John W., The Saturday Review of Politics, Literature, Science and Art, Volume 56, 1883 (available on Google Books)
