= Marcovefa =

Frankish wife of Caribert I

Marcovefa (6th-century – fl. 561) was a Frankish queen consort by marriage to King Charibert I.

== Biography ==
Marcovefa was the daughter of a wool carder from the royal palace, according to Gregory of Tours. She and her sister Merofleda both became married to the King of Paris. This marriage aroused the indignation of Queen Ingoberga who was already married to the King. This situation created scandal. However, the issue of greatest concern to the Church was that Marcovefa had been a nun prior to their marriage. Initially, he refused to divorce Marcovefa, and was therefore excommunicated by the Church. Marcovefa was excommunicated, as well. Soon thereafter, Marcovefa died, with some seeing her death as punishment from God. This forced him to eventually divorce the sisters and take Ingoberga back.

Still, according to Gregory, Marcowefa died shortly afterward, followed in the tomb by Charibert himself at the end of the year 567.
