= Merofleda =

Merofleda (6th-century – fl. 561) was a Frankish queen consort by marriage to king Charibert I.

She was the daughter of a craftsman, and the sister of Marcovefa. The two sisters both married Charibert I, despite him already being married to Ingoberga. He repudiated Ingoberga to marry the two sisters, which resulted in a scandal. He was eventually forced to divorce the sisters and take Ingoberga back.
