= Theudechild =

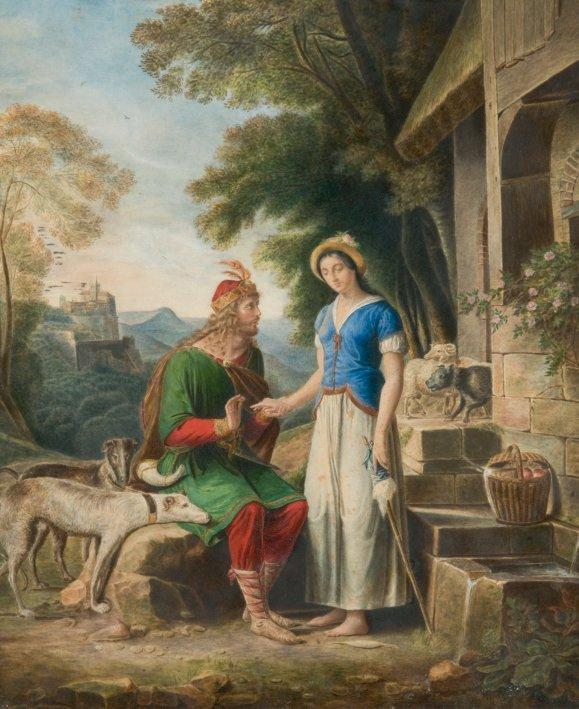
- Charibert I, King of France, offering the royal ring to Theudechild (J D Lascours, d'après Jean-Antoine Laurent)

Queen consort of Paris
- Born: c. 540
- Died: c. 570
- Spouse: Charibert I (m. 566; died 567)
- Dynasty: Merovingian (by Marriage)

Theudechild (c. 540 – c. 570) was a Frankish queen consort by marriage to king Charibert I.

She is believed to have been the daughter of a cowherd or a shepherd.

She married Charibert in 566. She was his fourth wife, but the second to be recognized as legitimate by the church. The marriage has been the inspiration of artists. Together, they had one son who died in infancy.

She was not Charibert's most powerful partner but she was able to maintain his favour and accumulate wealth for herself. After Charibert's death, she aimed to marry his brother, King Guntram. Initially, Guntram was welcoming and led Theudechild to believe that she would be able to have a respected position in his kingdom. She arrived to his court with all her luxurious possessions. However, Guntram seized Theudechild's wealth for himself and sent her to a nunnery.

While at the nunnery, she attempted to escape to Spain with a travelling Visigoth but was caught by the abbess. According to Gregory of Tours: "The abbess, who had caught her red-handed, had her beaten mercilessly and locked her up in her cell. There she remained until her dying day, suffering awful anguish”.
