= Basilica of Sant'Alessandro =

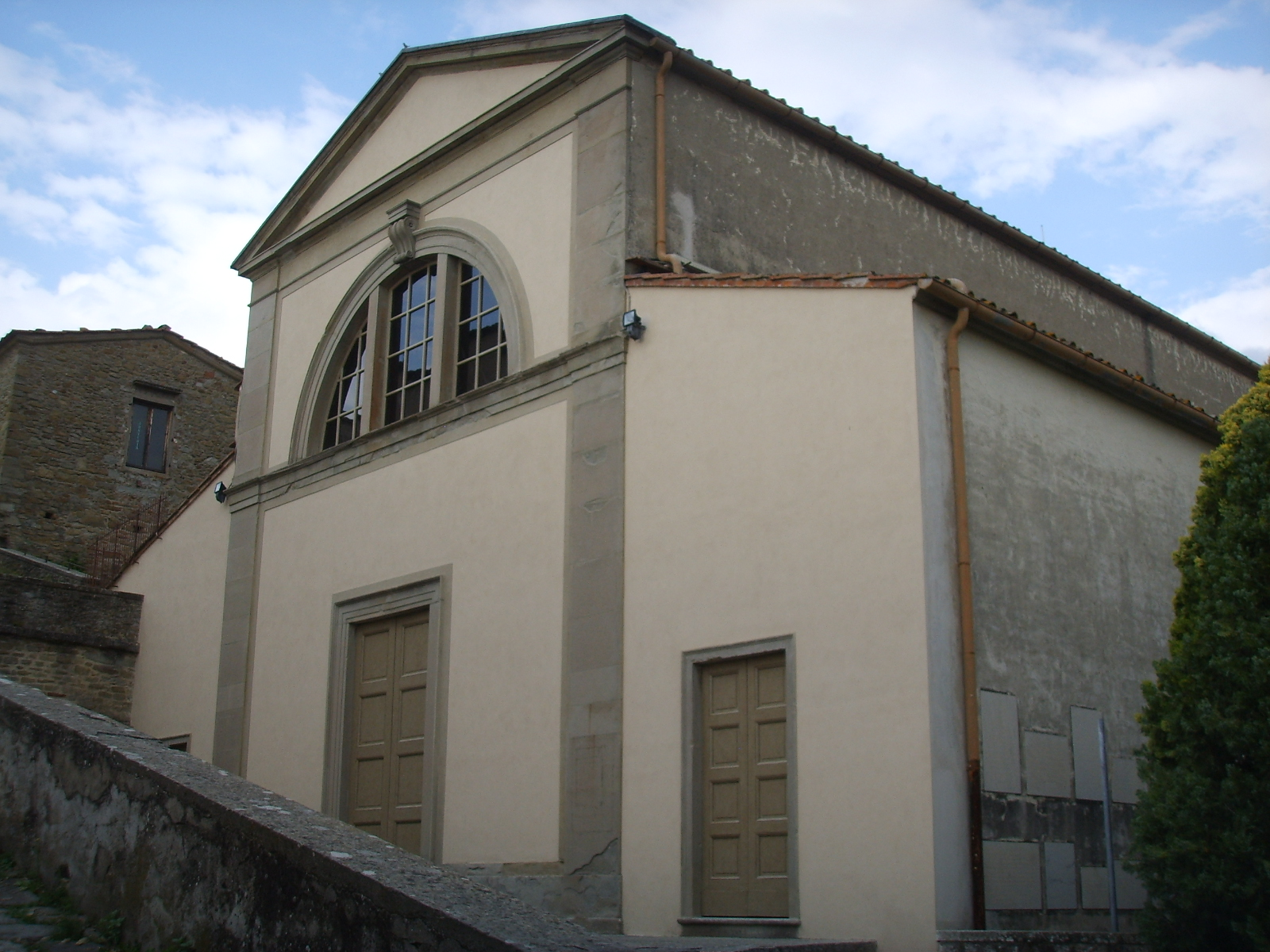
- Front of the church
- Basilica of Sant'Alessandro
- 43°48′26.8″N 11°17′24.2″E
- Location: Fiesole, Tuscany
- Country: Italy
- Denomination: Catholic

History
- Status: Minor basilica
- Consecrated: 6th century

Architecture
- Style: Neoclassical (facade)

Administration
- Diocese: Diocese of Fiesole

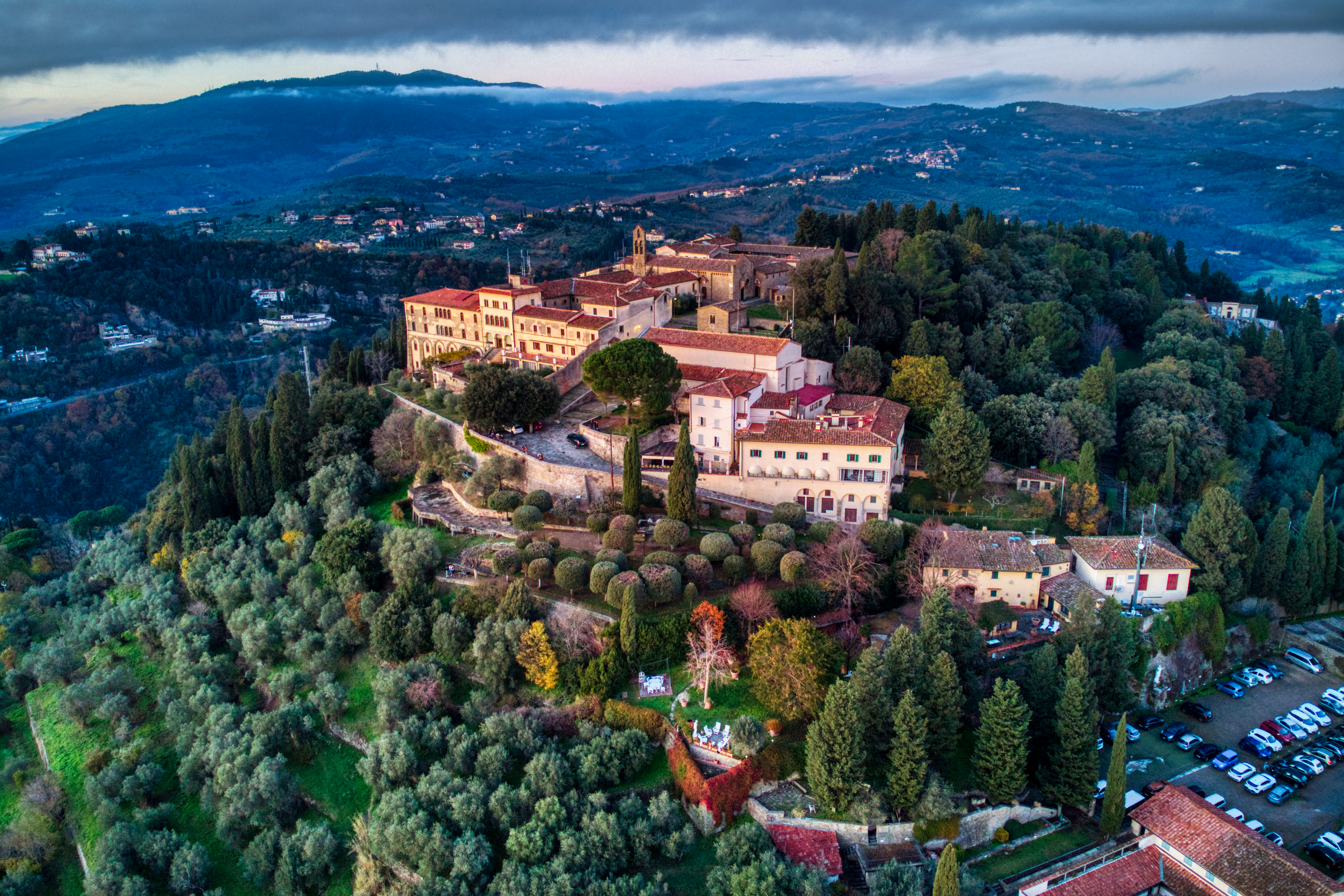
Sant'Alessandro near the top of the highest point in Fiesole

The Basilica of Sant'Alessandro is a Catholic church in Fiesole, Italy. Built in the 6th century on the site of an Etruscan temple, it is the oldest church in Fiesole. The neoclassical façade was added in the early 19th century, while the interior remains largely preserved in its original design.

== History ==
Sant'Alessandro was built on the site of an Etruscan temple, near the top of the highest point in Fiesole. It was likely commissioned by King Theodoric the Great in the 6th century, making it the oldest church in Fiesole. The church was originally named Santo Pietro in Gerusalemme (Saint Peter in Jerusalem), until the year 823, when it was renamed for Saint Alessandro, a former Bishop of Fiesole, who was martyred in the River Reno near Bologna in AD 590. Alessandro's remains were returned to Fiesole, where they were interred behind the altar of the church.

Today, the church is only used as an exhibition venue.

== Architecture ==
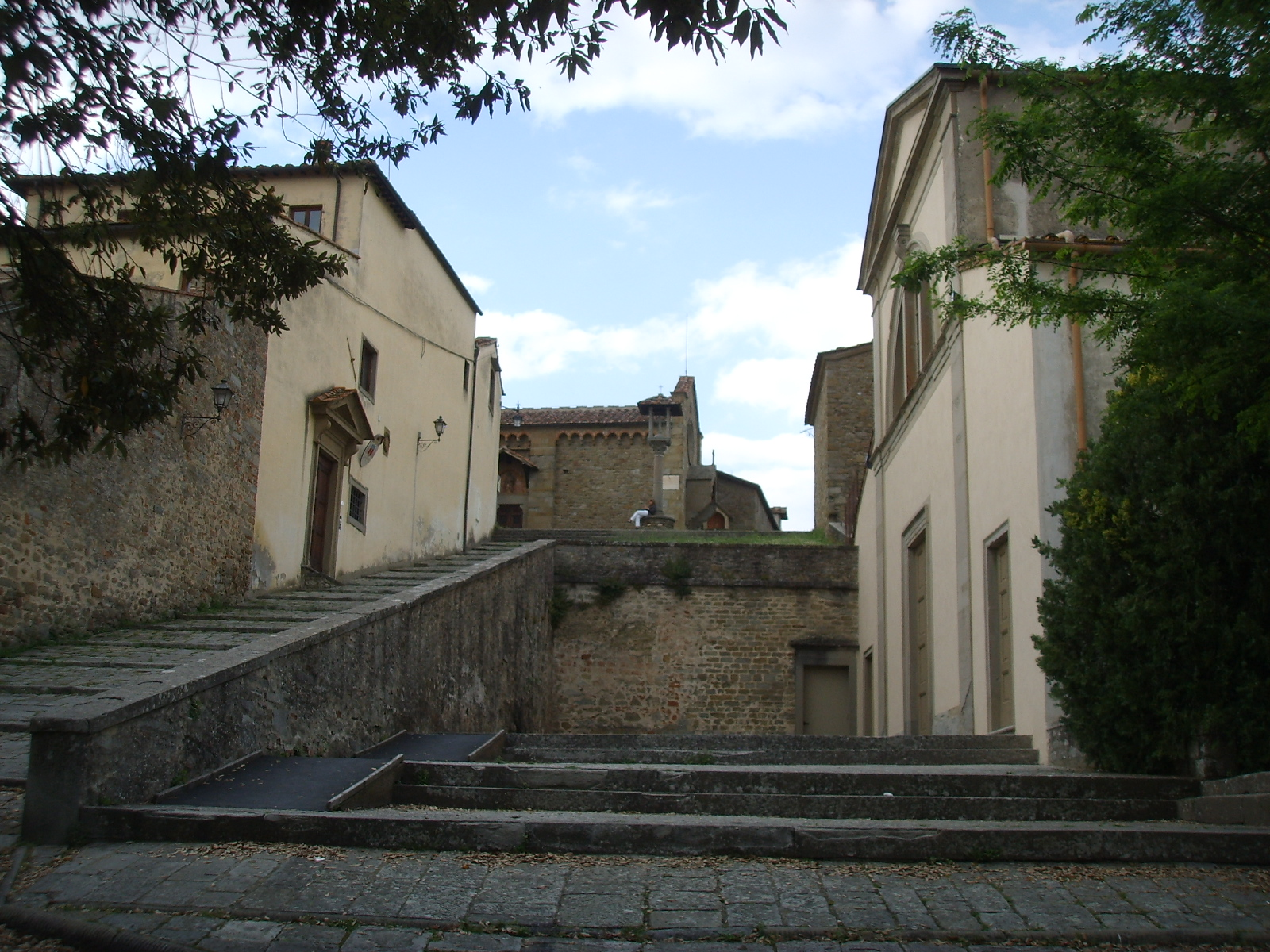
Church (right) next to the stairs up to the San Francesco Monastery

Little remains of the church's original exterior, due to extensive reconstruction over the centuries, beginning in the 11th century, and occurring again in 1570 and 1782. From 1815 to 1819, the original façade was replaced by the current neoclassical façade, designed by Giuseppe Del Rosso. From 1956 to 1973, an extensive restoration was undertaken to revive many of the church's original elements. Several of the later restorations uncovered Etruscan remains beneath the apse, as well as other archeological discoveries dating to the Etruscan, Roman, and Lombard periods.

The interior of the church is better-preserved. It retains the ancient basilica floor plan, with three naves. The central nave is twice the width of the side aisles, and is flanked on either side by a row of eight columns, of which 15 are made of cipollino marble. They are topped by ionic capitals that were repurposed from other ancient Roman buildings in the town.

On the left side of the nave is a chapel decorated with Renaissance frescoes, and a 16th century panel by Gerino di Pistoia.
