= Lambert of Lyon =

Abbot of Abbey of Fontenelle and Bishop of Lyon

Saint Lambertus (Lambert, Landebertus), (625-688), Abbot of Abbey of Fontenelle and Bishop of Lyon (678-688). His feast day is celebrated on 14 April. He was son of Erlebert (son of Charibert nobilis en Neustria) and so nephew of Robert I, Bishop of Tours. He was born in Quernes where his father was the seigneur.

Because of his high rank, he was sent to the court of Clotaire III, where he soon won the respect of the king and his ministers. Despite this, he chose the life of a clergy and studied under the direction of Abbot Saint Wandrille at Fontenelle Abbey where he received the monastic habit. After Wandrill's death in 665, he was elected as his successor.

The competence of Lambertus’ administration of the abbey was soon known. Kings were to take advantage of its examples and its opinions. Childeric II honored his confidence and made large donations to the abbey. Theuderic III, who succeeded his brother in 675, was however, too liberal for the abbot. He did provide land in Donzère where Lambertus built a monastery.

Among his disciples were his uncle Adelbert, Saint Hermeland Indre, Saint Erembert (later Bishop of Toulouse), and Saint Condède, hermit of England, who founded the Monastery of Belcinac on an island in the Seine.

Saint Genesius, Bishop of Lyon, died around the year 679, and Lambertus was elected to replace him on the recommendation of the king and with the consent of the clergy and the people. He died in 688. Lambertus was one of the early members of the Robertian family by virtue of his relationship with his uncle Robert I.

== Sources ==
- Christian Settipani, Les Ancêtres de Charlemagne, 2e édition revue et corrigée, éd. P & G, Prosopographia et Genealogica, 2015, p. 134.
- Hervé Pinoteau, La symbolique royale française, Ve-XVIIIe siècles, P.S.R. éditions, 2004, p. 45.
