= Charibert I =

King of Paris from 561 to 567

Charibert I *Hariberht
- King of the Franks
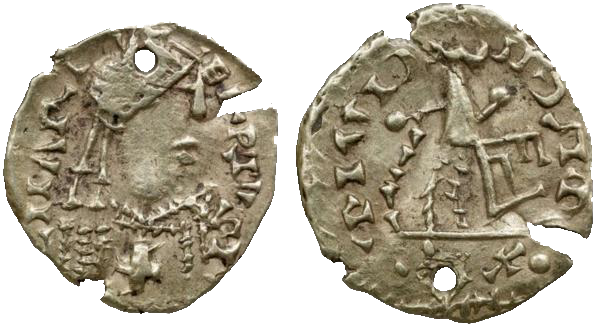
- Tremissis of Charibert I minted at Aire. Obverse: diademed, draped, and cuirassed bust facing right, with a cross on the chest; reverse: Victory facing right, holding two globes. Paris, BnF, Department of Coins, Medals and Antiques.

King of Paris
- Reign: 561–567
- Predecessor: Clotaire I
- Successor: Partitioned
- Born: c. 517/520
- Died: December 567 (aged 47/50)
- Burial: Blavia castellum, Tractatus Armoricani
- Spouse: Ingoberga; Merofleda; Marcovefa; Theudechild (m. 566)
- Issue: Charibert of Hesbaye; Bertha of Kent; Chlothar
- Dynasty: Merovingian
- Father: Clotaire I
- Mother: Ingund
- Religion: Chalcedonian Christianity (excommunicated)

Charibert I (French: Caribert; Latin: Charibertus; c. 517/520 – December 567) was the Merovingian King of Paris, the second-eldest son of Chlothar I and his first wife Ingund. His elder brother Gunthar died sometime before their father's death. He shared in the partition of the Frankish kingdom that followed his father's death in 561, receiving the old kingdom of Childebert I, with its capital at Paris.

== Personal life ==
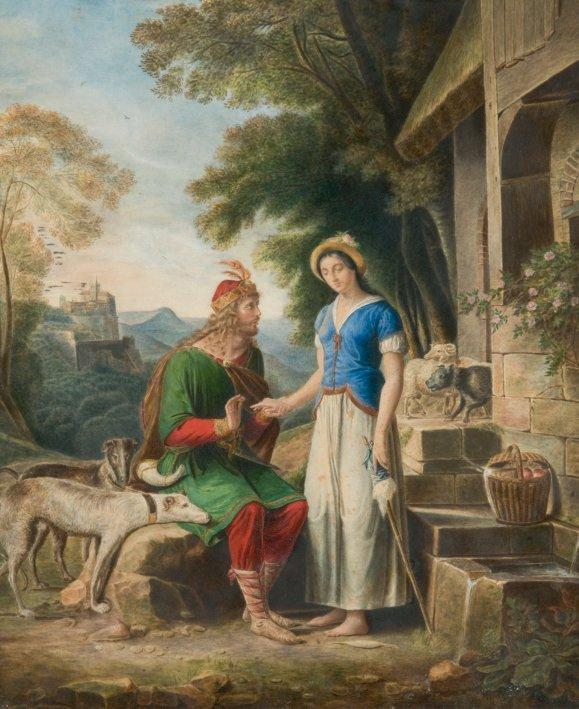
Chartibert I, King of France, offering the royal ring to Theudechild (J D Lascours, d'après Jean-Antoine Laurent)

Charibert married Ingoberga and they had possibly three children:

- Charibert of Hesbaye (d. 636) (disputed)
- Bertha, who married Æthelberht of Kent
- Chlothar (542)

Charibert's daughter Bertha married Æthelberht, the pagan King of Kent. She took Bishop Liudhard with her as her private confessor. Her influence in the Kentish court was instrumental in the success of St. Augustine of Canterbury's mission in 597, effecting the conversion to Christianity of the first Anglo-Saxon ruler.

== Military campaigns and enthronement ==
Partition of Chlothar's kingdom, 561; Charibert's realm in pink

In 556, Chlothar sent his sons Charibert and Guntram (his youngest) against their stepmother, "Chunna," and younger half-brother, "Chramn," who were in revolt. During ongoing negotiations, Chramn was hiding out on Black Mountain in the Limousin. When the negotiations failed, the two armies prepared for battle. However, a thunderstorm prevented any engagement, and Chramn (who was hiding out in Black Mountain) sent forged letters to his brothers (Charibert and Guntram) in which he falsely reported the death of their father (Chlothar). Charibert and Guntram immediately returned to Burgundy to secure their positions.

After the actual death of Chlothar in 561, the Frankish kingdom was divided between his sons in a new configuration (map, left). Each son ruled a distinct realm which was not necessarily geographically coherent but could contain two unconnected regions. Their kingdoms were named after the city from which they ruled. Charibert received Neustria (the region between the Somme and the Loire), Aquitaine, and Novempopulana with Paris as his capital. His other chief cities were Rouen, Tours, Poitiers, Limoges, Bordeaux, Toulouse, Cahors, and Albi. Guntram received Burgundy. Sigebert received Austrasia (including Rheims) with his capital at Metz, and the youngest brother Chilperic received a compact kingdom with Soissons as its capital.

== Death and legacy ==
Though Charibert was eloquent and learned in the law, Gregory of Tours found him one of the most dissolute of the early Merovingians. He maintained four concurrent wives, two of them sisters, and this resulted in his excommunication by Germanus. This was the first ever excommunication of a Merovingian king. As a result, he was buried in disgrace at Blavia castellum, a stronghold in the Tractus Armoricanus. At his death, his brothers divided his realm between them, agreeing at first to hold Paris in common. His surviving queen (out of four), Theudechild, proposed a marriage with Guntram, though a council held at Paris in 557 had outlawed such matches as incestuous. Guntram decided to house her more safely, though unwillingly, in a nunnery at Arles. His bastard, Charibert of Hesbaye receiving nothing.

The main source for Charibert's life is Gregory of Tours' History of the Franks (Book IV, 3,16,22,26 and IX, 26), and from the English perspective Bede's Ecclesiastic History of the English People.

Charibert I Merovingian Dynasty
Preceded by Clotaire I	King of Paris; 561–567	Succeeded by Partitioned
