= Waldrada =

Waldrada or Walderada (French Waldrade, Italian Gualdrada) is a feminine given name of Germanic origin.

It may refer to:

- Waldrada (Lombard) (531–572), queen of Austrasia
- Waldrada of Lotharingia (fl. 855–66), the concubine of Lothair II
- Waldrada of Tuscany (died 997), dogaressa of Venice
