= Bernard of Italy =

King of Italy (797–818)

Bernard
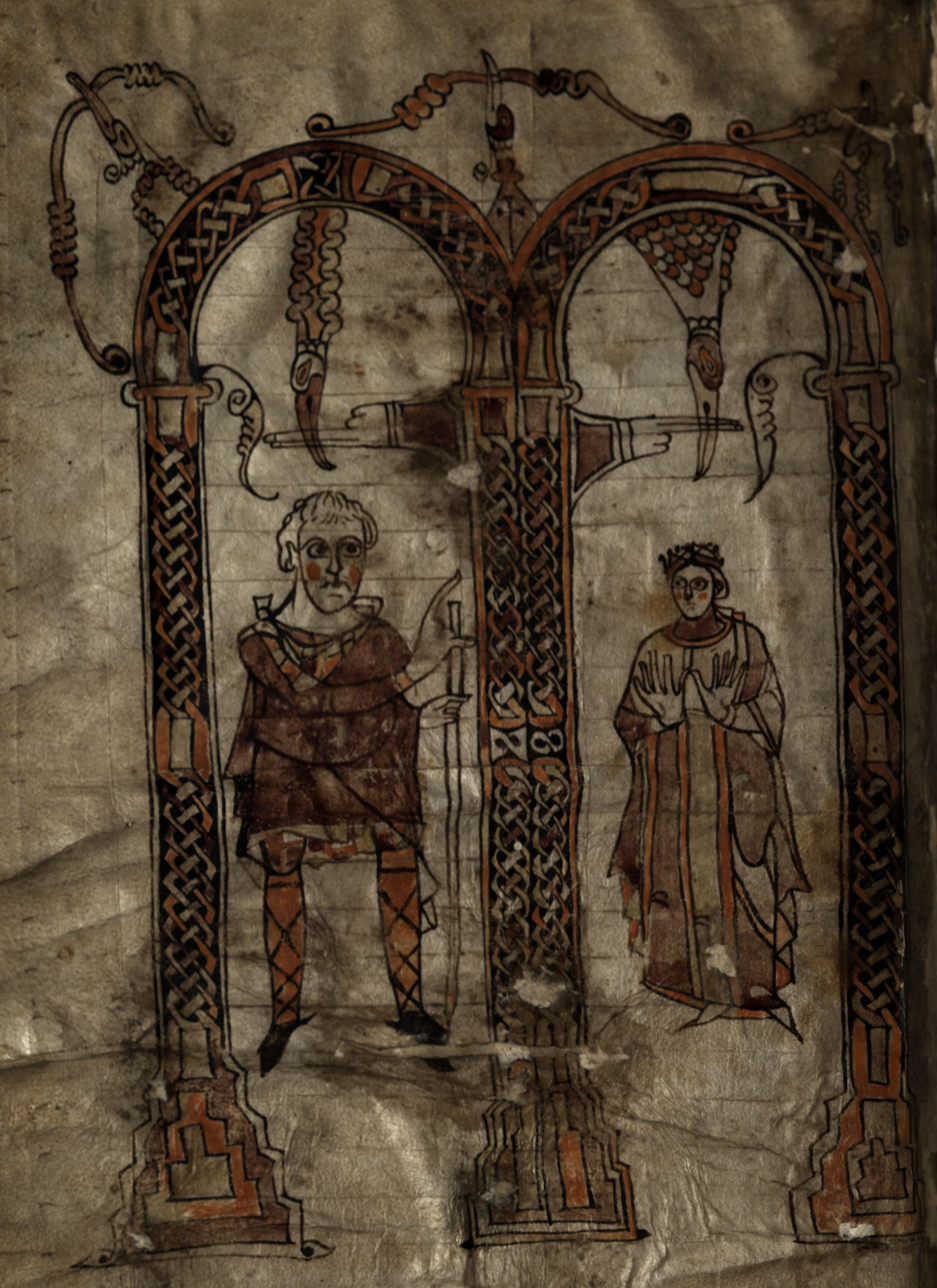
- Bernard (left) and Iustitia (right)

King of Italy
- Reign: 810–817
- Predecessor: Pepin Carloman
- Successor: Lothair I
- Born: 797; Vermandois, Francia
- Died: 17 April 818 (aged 20–21); Aachen, Francia
- Burial: Milan, Lombardy
- Consort: Cunigunda of Laon
- Issue: Pepin I, Count of Vermandois
- House: Carolingian, progenitor of the Herbertine (Bernardine) branch
- Father: Pepin Carloman

Bernard (797 – 17 April 818) was the King of Italy, from 810 to 817, within the Carolingian Empire. He was an illegitimate son and successor of King Pepin of Italy. He plotted against his uncle, Emperor Louis the Pious, when the latter's Ordinatio Imperii made Bernard a vassal of his cousin Lothair. When his plot was discovered, Louis had him deposed by the end of 817, and then condemned and blinded, a procedure which killed him.

== Life ==
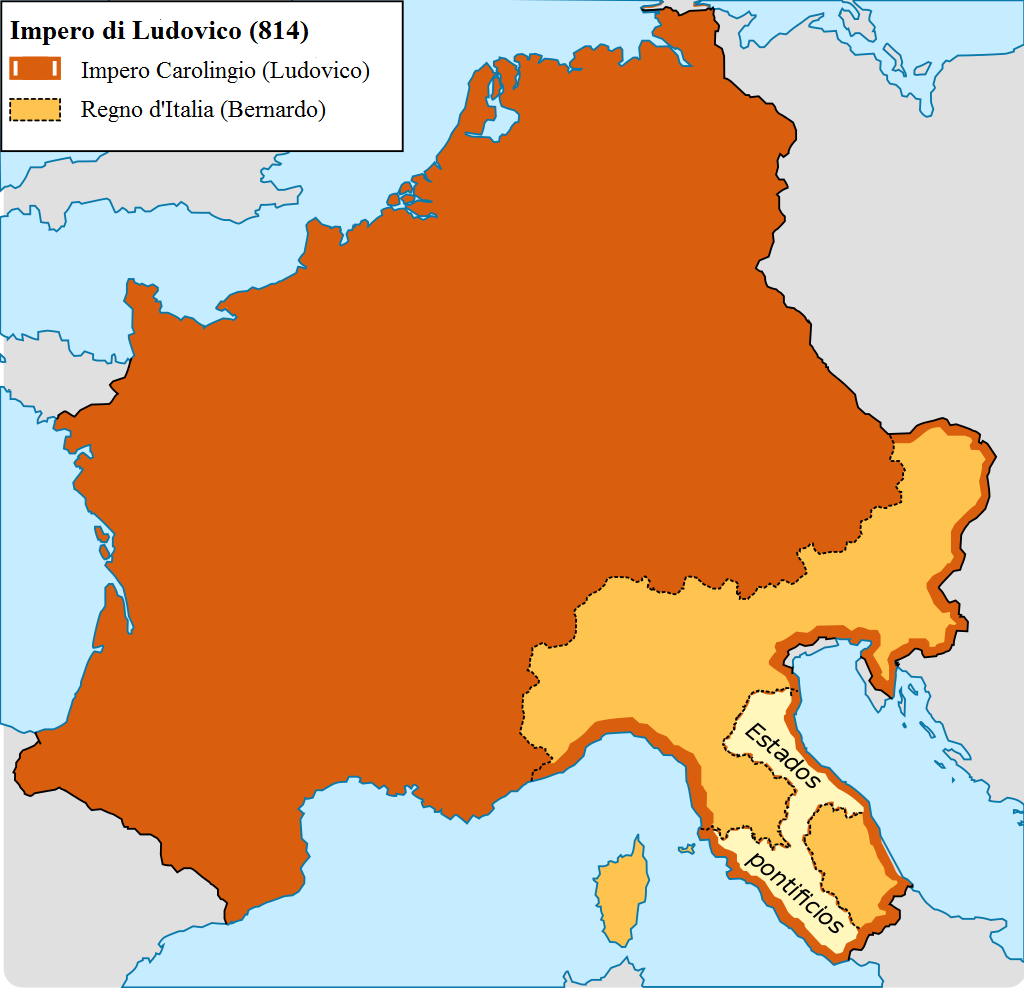
The realm of Bernard (colored lightly), within the empire of Louis the Pious

Bernard was born in 797, to king Pepin of Italy, himself the son of the Emperor Charlemagne. In 806, the emperor issued a succession settlement, assigning to Pepin not only Italy, but also Bavaria with its eastern marches. In 810, Pepin died from an illness contracted at the siege of Venice. Bernard succeeded him in the Kingdom of Italy, a distinctive realm within the Carolingian Empire, and was confirmed by Charlemagne himself, in 812 and 813. His domains included northern and central Italy, stretching from Lombardy to the Duchy of Friuli, with its eastern dependencies.

Bernard's realm did not include Bavaria, since his father Pepin died before Charlemagne (d. 814), and thus the settlement of 806 did not come into full effect. Already in 814, Bernard's paternal uncle, new emperor Louis the Pious, awarded Bavaria and its eastern dependencies to his oldest son Lothair. Thus a complex situation started to emerge, regarding the delimitation between Bernard's and Lothair's jurisdictions on the south-eastern frontiers of the Carolingian Empire. In 817, emperor Louis issued a succession settlement known as Ordinatio Imperii, and appointed his son Louis as king in Bavaria, with additional jurisdiction over Carantania, Bohemia and other dependent Slavs and Avars. Since Carantania was previously under jurisdiction of the Duchy of Friuli, that belonged to Pepins's Italian realm, the announcement of its future transfer to Bavarian jurisdiction indicated the reduction Bernard's domains.

Additional challenges for Bernard stemmed from the fact that, unlike Louis' sons, he was not mentioned by name in the Ordinatio Imperii, that contained an ambiguous clause on the status of the Italian realm. Under that clause, it was stated that Italy should be governed in the same manner as it was and is done during the reigns of emperors Charlemagne and Louis, emphasizing that the same arrangements should be upheld under Louis' oldest son and co-emperor Lothair, if he should live to succeed his father as the new emperor.

Open to interpretations, and failing to explicitly confirm and thus secure Bernard's rule over the Italian realm, those provisions were received in Italy as a cause for concern. Certain of Bernard's counselors, including count Eggideo, and chamberlain Reginhard, persuaded Bernard that this arrangement threatened his position. Other dignitaries were also involved, such as Reginhar, a grandson of a Thuringian rebel against Charlemagne, and nobleman Hardrad, while bishops Anshelm of Milan and Theodulf of Orléans were also suspected of being involved, but there was no evidence either to support or contradict that in the case of Theodulf, whilst the involvement for Anshelm remained uncertain.

Prior to this, Bernard's relationship with his paternal uncle appears to have been cooperative, and it seemed that Bernard's main complaint in 817 was the notion of him also becoming a vassal of the co-emperor Lothair. In practical terms, his actual position had not been altered at all by the terms of the decree, and he could safely have continued to rule under such a system. Nonetheless, "partly true" reports came to Louis the Pious that his nephew was planning to set up an 'unlawful' (i.e. independent) regime in Italy.

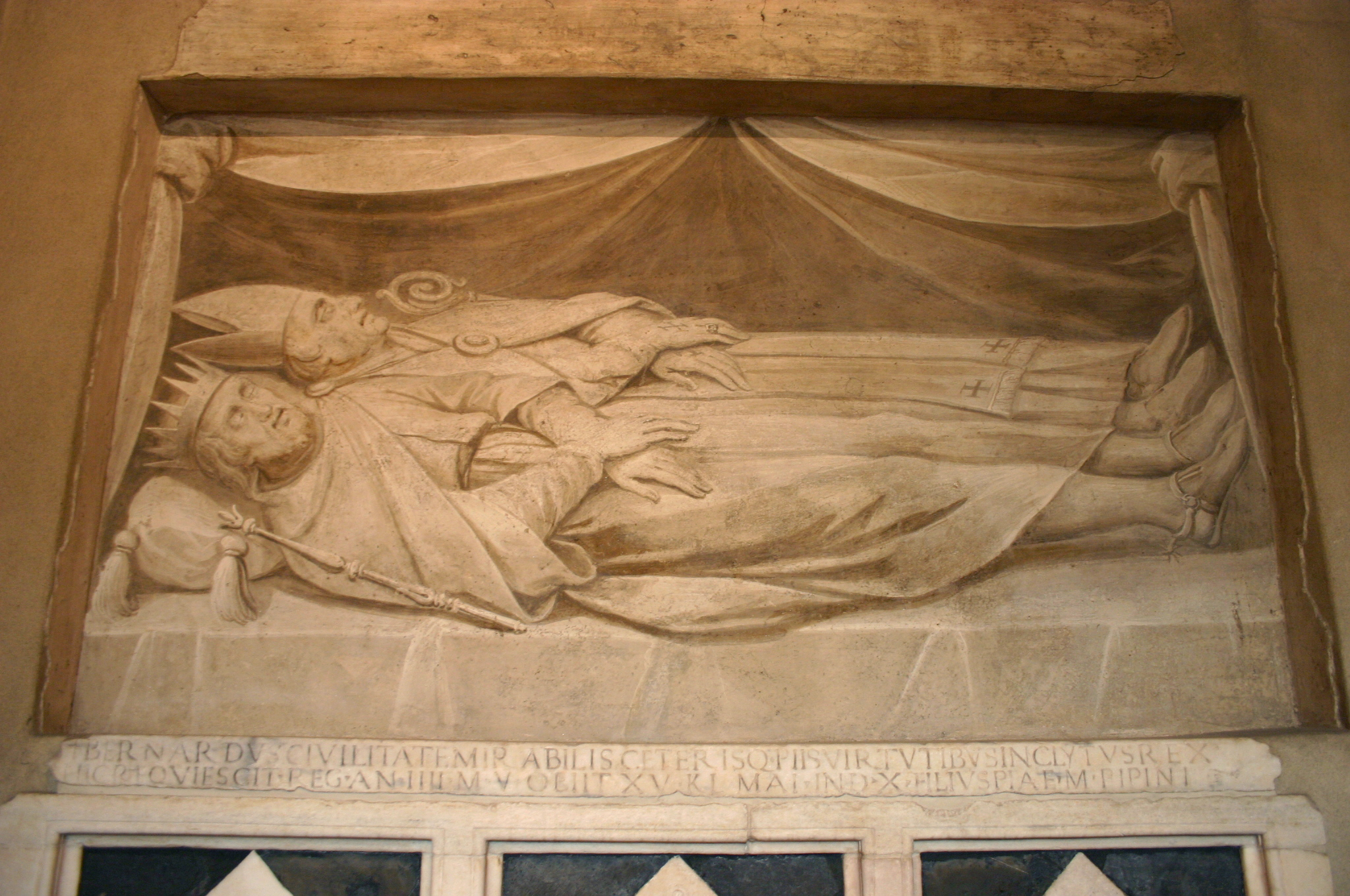
17th-century commemorative fresco from Bernard's grave in Milan, Italy

Louis the Pious reacted swiftly to the plot, marching south to Chalon. Bernard and his associates were taken by surprise; Bernard traveled to Chalon in an attempt to negotiate terms, but he and the ringleaders were forced to surrender to Louis, who had them taken to Aachen where Bernard was tried, condemned for treason, deposed and sentenced to death, together with other conspirators. Louis commuted their sentences to blinding, which would neutralize Bernard as a threat without actually killing him; however, the process of blinding (carried out by means of pressing a red-hot stiletto to the eyeballs) proved so traumatic that Bernard died in agony two days after the procedure was carried out. At the same time, Louis also had his half-brothers Drogo, Hugh and Theoderic tonsured and confined to monasteries, to prevent other Carolingian offshoots challenging the main line. He also treated those guilty or suspected of conspiring with Bernard harshly: Theodulf of Orleans was imprisoned, and died soon afterwards; the lay conspirators were blinded, the clerics deposed and imprisoned; all lost lands and honours.

Bernard died of his wounds on 17 April 818.

Bernard was married to Cunigunda of Laon, but the year of their marriage is obscure. They had one son, Pepin I, Count of Vermandois, who was born in 817. A text called The Vision of the Poor woman of Laon criticizes Louis for Bernard's death.

== Legacy ==
Soon after Bernard's deposition, the rule over Italian realm was bestowed upon Louis' eldest son Lothair. In 821, emperor Louis pardoned some of Bernard's co-conspirators, and in 822 he also made a display of public penance at Attigny, where he confessed before all the court to having sinfully slain his nephew, and he also welcomed his half-brothers back into his favour. These actions possibly stemmed from guilt over his part in Bernard's death. It has been argued by some historians that Louis' behaviour left him open to clerical domination, and reduced his prestige and respect amongst the Frankish nobility. Others, however, point out that Bernard's plot had been a serious threat to the stability of the kingdom, and the reaction no less a threat; Louis' display of penance, then, "was a well-judged gesture to restore harmony and re-establish his authority."

== See also ==
- Medieval Italy
- Kingdom of Italy (medieval)
- Duchy of Friuli

== Sources ==
- Altmann, Wilhelm; Bernheim, Ernst (1891). Ausgewählte Urkunden zur Erläuterung der Verfassungsgeschichte Deutschlands im Mittelalter. Berlin: Gaertners Verlagsbuchhandlung.
- Bowlus, Charles R. (1995). Franks, Moravians, and Magyars: The Struggle for the Middle Danube, 788-907. Philadelphia: University of Pennsylvania Press. ISBN 978-0-8122-3276-9.
- Goldberg, Eric J. (2006). Struggle for Empire: Kingship and Conflict under Louis the German, 817-876. Ithaca, NY: Cornell University Press. ISBN 978-0-8014-3890-5.
- Luthar, Oto, ed. (2008). The Land Between: A History of Slovenia. Frankfurt am Main: Peter Lang. ISBN 978-3-631-57011-1.
- McKitterick, Rosamond (1983). The Frankish Kingdoms Under the Carolingians, 751-987. Harlow: Longman. ISBN 978-0-582-49005-5.
- Nelson, Janet L. (1992). Charles the Bald. London and New York: Longman. ISBN 978-1-317-89957-0.
- Nelson, Janet L. (2019). King and Emperor: A New Life of Charlemagne. Oakland: University of California Press. ISBN 978-0-520-31420-7.
- Reuter, Timothy (2013) [1991]. Germany in the Early Middle Ages c. 800–1056. London and New York: Routledge. ISBN 978-1-317-87239-9.
- Riché, Pierre (1993). The Carolingians: A Family Who Forged Europe. Philadelphia: University of Pennsylvania Press. ISBN 0-8122-1342-4.
- Scholz, Bernhard W., ed. (1970). Carolingian Chronicles: Royal Frankish Annals and Nithard's Histories. Ann Arbor, MI: University of Michigan Press. ISBN 0-472-06186-0.
- Wickham, Chris (1981). Early Medieval Italy: Central Power and Local Society, 400-1000. Totowa, NJ: Barnes & Noble. ISBN 978-0-389-20217-2.

Bernard of Italy Carolingian dynasty Died: 17 April 818
Regnal titles
Preceded by Pepin Carloman	King of Italy; 810 – 817 with Charlemagne (810–814)	Succeeded by Lothair I
