= Ingoberga =

Merovingian queen of the Franks (c. 565–c. 601)

Queen consort of Paris
- Born: c. 520-535 (Note: The date of 520 is based on Gregory's assessment that Ingoberga was about 70 when she died. However, this is incompatible with the birth dates of her children, especially Bertha of Kent, born c.565, married Æthelberht of Kent in 580.)
- Died: 589; Tours
- Spouse: Charibert I (died 567)
- Issue: Bertha of Kent; Charibert of Hesbaye?
- Dynasty: Merovingian (by Marriage)

Ingoberga (c. 520/535 – 589 in Tours) was a Frankish queen consort, the first wife of the Frankish king Charibert I.

Her own lineage has not been determined. Ingoberga and Charibert were the parents of Bertha of Kent, the later wife of king Æthelberht of Kent and the initiator of the Christian mission under the Anglo-Saxons (the so-called Gregorian mission).

Ingoberga's marriage was not easy. According to Gregory of Tours, a contemporary historian:

"king Charibert married Ingoberga, by whom he had a daughter who afterwards married a husband in Kent and was taken there. At that time Ingoberga had in her service two daughters of a certain poor man, of whom the first was called Marcovefa, who wore the robe of a nun, and the other was Merofled. The king was very much in love with them. They were, as I have said, the daughters of a worker in wool. Ingoberga was jealous that they were loved by the king and secretly gave the father work to do, thinking that when the king saw this he would dislike his daughters. While he was working she called the king. He expected to see something strange, but only saw this man at a distance weaving the king's wool. Upon this he was angry and left Ingoberga and married Merofled."
