= Ferreolus of Rodez =

Roman senator

Ferreolus, also called Ferreolus of Rodez (born c. 485) was a Gallo-Roman senator from Narbonne, then Narbo, who later lived in Rodez where his family had also held Trevidos, a villa estate near Segodunum, since the mid-fifth century at least.

== Life ==
Ferreolus was the son of Tonantius Ferreolus of Nimes and his wife Industria of Narbo. He was evidently the senator and relative, Ferreolus, who was reported by Apollinaris of Valence in a letter to Avitus of Vienne to have visited him in around 520.

Ferreolus experienced the change in rule from the Visigoths to the Ostrogoths after the Battle of Vouille and from the Ostrogoths to the Franks after the cession of Provence to Theodoric of Austrasia after 534. He was a relative of Parthenius who had served the Ostrogoths and was to become one of Theodoric of Austrasia's key civil officials. The estates of the Ferreoli in the valley of the Gardon (Prusianum) were near the new borderline between the Franks and Visigoths after the Ostrogoths had ceased to administer Visigothic lands in southern Gaul and Ferreolus and his family ended up with the Franks as masters since the better part of their properties fell within the lands of the new Austrasian kingdom. Much of Prusianum was under the jurisdiction of the See of Uzes which was effectively a family controlled bishopric throughout the 6th century and was then held by Ferreolus' brother Bishop Firminus of Uzes. Part of the properties were apparently in the See of Nimes the Frankish part of which was smaller than the Visigothic controlled part. A new diocese, Arisitum, was created out of the Frankish parishes of the See of Nimes by Sigibert of Austrasia about 570 and the bishopric was given to Ferreolus' son, Deotarius.

The eastern estates thus disposed, Ferreolus then apparently associated with the properties at Segodunum or other properties near Rodez. One of his children, Tarsicia became a nun at Rodez. Others of his children appear to have associated with and even relocated to the Austrasian court at Metz and it appears (certainly from his marriage to Dode) that he was there on occasion as well. Moreover, he and his family do not appear to have occupied the Episcopal See of Rodez though it is arguable some of these estates (Trevidos) may have been part of the diocese of Arisitum.

He married, after about 520, Dode. (She is sometimes identified with Saint Doda of Reims, Abbess of Saint Pierre de Reims, although most hagiography regarding the saint does not indicate any marriage or children.)

Ferreolus and Dode had the following issue:

- Ansbertus
- Agilulf or Aigulf (born 537), Bishop of Metz (590/591 – 601)
- Babon
- Deotarius, Bishop of Arisitum
- Ragenfred

== Ancestry ==
Ancestors of Ferreolus of Rodez

Ferreolus
Tonantius Ferreolus
Afranius Syagrius
Syagria
Tonantius Ferreolus
Papianilla
Ferreolus of Rodez
(unidentified son of Ennodius)
Flavius Magnus
(unidentified daughter of Agricola)
Probus
Industria
Apollinaris
Thaumastus
Eulalia

== Sources ==
- Christian Settipani, Les Ancêtres de Charlemagne (France: Éditions Christian, 1989).
- Christian Settipani, Continuite Gentilice et Continuite Familiale Dans Les Familles Senatoriales Romaines A L'epoque Imperiale, Mythe et Realite, Addenda I - III (juillet 2000-octobre 2002) (n.p.: Prosopographica et Genealogica, 2002).
- Martin Heinzelmann, "Gallische Prosopographia", Francia, 10 (1982), pp. 531-718
