= Gothic War in Spain (456) =

Gothic war in Spain of 456
- Part of the Fall of the Roman Empire and Roman–Germanic Wars
- Map of Spain prior to the Gothic War.
Date	456
Location	Spain
Result	Visigothic victory

Belligerents
Visigoths; Western Roman Empire; Burgundians; Franks	Suebi; Bagaudae

Commanders and leaders
Theodoric II; Gundioc; Avitus	Rechiar; Basilius

Strength
Unknown	Suebi: 6,000

Casualties and losses
Unknown	Unknown, high

The Gothic War in Spain of 456 was a military operation of the Visigoths commissioned by the West Roman emperor Avitus. This operation consisted of an extensive campaign aimed at reclaiming the Spanish provinces of Lusitania and Betica that were in the hands of the Suebi and threatened Roman power in the provinces of Cartaginensis and Tarraconensis. The main players in this war were Theoderic II who led the army of the Visigoths and Rechiar the king of the Suebi. The Visigothic army was supported by Franks and Burgundian auxiliary troops.

== Sources ==
The story of this war is briefly reported by the Spanish bishop Hydatius who was an eyewitness to the looting of the city Braga by the Visigoths. In addition Sidonius Apollinaris the son-in-law of Emperor Avitus, whom Theodoric knew personally, is also a useful source for information. Other early source is Jordanes who wrote a history about the Goths in the sixth century.

== Background ==
The Suebi arrived in 409 in Spain where they have since stayed in the poor and mountainous Gallaecia. Initially, they were not a threat to the Romans. Compared to the Visigoths and Vandals, they only brought small war gangs on their feet. In contrast, they were never part of the Roman covenant policy, so that they behaved differently from the foederati in Gaul who served as garrison soldiers and were under the supervision of the Roman army . Emperor Honorius did not think it was necessary at the time that the military campaign of Wallia from 415 to 418 was also directed against the Seubi. Nevertheless, there was a lack of a strong imperial army in northwestern Spain to offer sufficient counterweight, usually the inhabitants had to defend themselves.

Under King Hermeric (409–438) the Sueve mainly stayed in Gallaecia. His successor Rechila (438–448), on the other hand, pursued a very warlike policy aimed at territorial expansion. From Gallaecia he led several campaigns against the Romans in the nearby Hispania Baetica and Hispania Lusitania. Rechila defeated the Vandal captain Andevotus in 438, who was possibly in Roman service. He then conquered the provincial capital Mérida (439) of Lusitania. This gave him his hands on this entire province. Two years later he repeated this trick by conquering the city of Sevilla (441) in the adjacent Baetica.

With the provincial capitals in their hands, Rechila put an end to Roman rule. The Imperial Army was too weak to expel him. Taking advantage of the situation, Richila now also set his arrows on Carthaginensis. His wargangs penetrated deep into this province. A Roman attempt to drive them back stranded in 446. General Vitus' army, which was reinforced with Gothic auxiliary troops, suffered a great defeat, after which the Suebi were free rein and were able to wread great devastation. Only the presence of the Visigoths in the north prevented them from also getting their hands on Tarraconesis and thus the whole of Spain.

== Prelude ==
=== Rechiar's attack on Tarraconensis ===
In 448 Rechila was succeeded by his son Rechiar who was at least as warlike. At the beginning of his reign, he had the comes Hispanae Censorius, who was imprisoned in Seville, murdered. He plundered the Ebro Valley and sought rapprochement with the Bagaudae who were active here. Later in 449 he went on a diplomatic mission to Toulouse, where Theodoric I, his father-in-law and Roman ally sat. On his return journey, Rechiar made an alliance with Basilius, the leader of the Bagaudae, and again went through the Ebro Valley, where he attacked Caesareas Augusta and took the city Lleida. He took many prisoners, but failed to take the province and thus complete the Suevi conquest of Spain.

=== Peace talks and a new war ===
In 452–453, the commander-in-chief of the Roman army Aëtius sent a delegation to the court of Rechiar to talk about peace. This delegation consisted of the military counts Mansuetus and Fronto. They concluded an agreement in which conditions were imposed over and over again. Rechiar renounced the province of Carthaginensis.

After the murder of Aetius and the emperors Valentinian III and Petronius Maximus in 455, Rechiar no longer felt bound by this and resumed his attempt to conquer all of Spain on the Romans. According to Jordanes, based on his relationship with the Visigothic king and Roman foederatus Theodoric II (his brother-in-law), he had 'the suspicion' that he could rule all over Hispania.

=== The rise of Emperor Avitus ===
In Toulouse, Avitus, the commander-in-chief of the Gallic field army, was declared new emperor in 455. This emperor had very good contacts at the Visigothic court, where a change of power had recently taken place. He maintained a friendly relationship with Theodoric II, the new king who was very Roman. Avitus inherited an empire that was threatened on multiple fronts. In addition to the Mediterranean area that was made unsafe by Vandal pirates, the new emperor received messages from the Spanish provinces that were very disturbing. Rechiar had meanwhile conquered the city Cartagena (Spain), taking control of the province of Carthaginensis and had started the conquest of Tarraconensis. However, if Jordanes information is correct, Rechiar made a colossal mistake, for Theodoric had his friendship with the emperor pre-laved over the family bond with Rechiar. Together with the emperor, the Gothic leader prepared a military operation to completely recapture Spain and put an end to the Suevi domination once and for all. Theodoric was given the important task of leading this army.

== The campaign of Theodoric II ==
=== Military strength and army build-up ===
While Avitus travelled to Italy to monetize his claim to the title of emperor there, Theodoric marched with a large army of foederati towards Spain to restore Roman rule. The army that was leaving consisted of Burgundian and Frankish auxiliary troops in addition to a main force of Visigoths. Once in Tarraconensis Roman units also joined Theoderic. . Data on the size of this army is missing. According to Thompson, the Sueven had an estimated 6,000 warriors, a real number compared to other groups from that period, and additionally reinforced with Bagaudae, which Rechiar had hired as mercenaries. The army that Theodorik led was at least equal to or larger than that of the Suebi.

=== Battle of the Urbicus ===
Theodoric's campaign went well. The combined army moved towards Galicia and encountered little opposition along the way. Rechiar had deployed his army on the River Urbicus (Órbigo), close to the city Astorga. On 5 October 456, Theodoric defeated Rechiar here in a battle on the Campus Paramus, twelve miles from the city Astorga. Rechiar was injured during the battle, but according to Hydatius he managed to flee to Portuscale (today Porto) in the heart of his kingdom. There he was eventually defeated and captured. Theodoric then conquered Bracara Augusta (Braga), the capital of the Suebi. According to tradition, things went rough and Theodoric's army looted several cities in Gallaecia next to Braga. Some of the Suevens were slaughtered and even holy places were attacked, probably because of the support of local clergy to the Suevens. After this, Theodoric's army controlled the Spanish provinces Hispania Baetica, Hispania Tarraconensis and South-Lusitania. The Suebi kingdom collapsed and quickly broke up into rival factions in the following years.

=== Deposition of Avitus ===
When Theodoric reached the message about the deposition of the emperor and the revolt in Gaul, he left the command to his generals Sunerik and Cyril and returned to Toulouse, while Gundioc with his entire army returned to the mountains of Sapaudia.

== Aftermath ==
The battle of the Urbicus was the beginning of the conquest of Spain by the Visigoths. The returned king of the Visigoths turned himself against the new Roman authority in Italy. Now that his comrade Avitus had been deposed and murdered, Theodoric set aside the treaty with the Romans at the beginning of 457 and revolted, breaking out the Gothic War of 457-458. In Spain, the Gothic garrisons were instructed to take over the power in the cities from the Romans.

== Sources ==
Primary sources

- Hydatius
- Sidonius Apollinaris
- Jordanes

== Bibliography ==
- E.A. Thompson (1982), Romans and Barbarians, University of Wisconsin Press
- R. Collins (2004), Visigothic Spain 409-711, Wiley-Blackwell
- J. Wijnendaele (2013), Romans and Barbarians, The Fall of the Roman Empire in the West, Davidsfonds Publishing House
