= Battle of Órbigo (456) =

Battle near Astorga, Spain

Coordinates: 41°59′23.62″N 5°42′23.58″W

- Part of the Fall of the Roman Empire and Roman–Germanic Wars
Date	456
Location	Órbigo Bridge,Órbigo, twelve miles from Astorga, Spain
Result	Visigothic victory

Belligerents
Visigoths; Burgundians; Western Roman Empire	Suevi

Commanders and leaders
Theodoric II; Gondioc; Chilperic	Rechiar

Strength
Unknown	Unknown

Casualties and losses
Unknown	Unknown

The Battle of Órbigo, also known as the Battle of the Urbicus and the Battle of Campus Paramus took place in 456 when the Visigoths of Theodoric II defeated the Suevi Kingdom and sacked their capital Braga. Although very little is known of the battle the defeat proved a significant blow to the Suevi who would enter a period of decline afterwards and would never fully recover their territory.

The Suevi King Rechiar had been expanding his territory at the expense of the Romans in Hispania, who were unable stop them. The Roman Emperor Avitus requested his allies the Visigoths of Theodoric II and the Burgundians of Gondiloc and Chilperic to attack the Suebi for him. Theodoric agreed and invaded Spain with his army.

Theodoric's campaign went well. The combined army moved towards Galicia and encountered little opposition along the way. Rechiar had deployed his army on the River Urbicus (Órbigo), close to the city Astorga. On 5 October 456, Theodoric defeated Rechiar here in a battle on the Campus Paramus, twelve miles from the city Astorga. Rechiar was injured during the battle, but according to Hydatius he managed to flee to Portuscale (today Porto) in the heart of his kingdom. There he was eventually defeated and captured. Theodoric then conquered Bracara Augusta (Braga), the capital of the Suebi. According to tradition, things went rough and Theodoric's army looted several cities in Gallaecia next to Braga. Some of the Suevens were slaughtered and even holy places were attacked, probably because of the support of local clergy to the Suevens. After this, Theodoric's army controlled the Spanish provinces Hispania Baetica, Hispania Tarraconensis and South-Lusitania. The Suebi kingdom collapsed and quickly broke up into rival factions in the following years.

== Sources ==
- Collins, Roger (2004). Visigothic Spain, 409–711. Oxford: Blackwell Publishing. ISBN 0-631-18185-7.
- Thompson, E. A. (1982). Romans and Barbarians: The Decline of the Western Empire. University of Wisconsin Press. ISBN 0-299-08700-X.
