= Victorius (dux) =

Count of Auvergne
- Reign: 480-489
- Predecessor: Title created
- Successor: Apollinaris of Clermont
- Died: 489

Victorius or Victor (died 489) was an arvernian aristocratic, Count of Auvergne and then dux of aquitania prima from 480 to 489 under the visigothic king Euric.

== Life ==
He was a personal friend of Sidonius Apollinaris, who would describe him as a pious and compassionate man.

Victorius was under the service of the visigothic king Euric and in 480 was granted the title of Count of Auvergne and then dux of aquitania prima. He held his court in the city of Clermont. He is also mentioned as dux septem civitates.

When Sidonius was imprisoned in 475 after the visigothic capture of Auvergne, Victorius dealt on his behalf with Euric, managing to get his sentence softened.

He arrested and executed the noble Eucharius probably for personal reasons.

He had to flee his domain with Sodonius' son, Apollinaris of Clermont, after the populace revolt against him, probably due to his libertine love life. He took refuge in Rome, where he didn't change his ways, and was consequently lapidated in 489.

French nobility
Preceded by Title created	Count of Auvergne; 480-489	Succeeded by Apollinaris
