= Marcellan conspiracy =

The Marcellan conspiracy was a political plot in late 456 or early 457 AD in the Praetorian Prefecture of Gaul, during the period of instability following the overthrow of the Western Roman emperor Avitus by the general Ricimer. The conspiracy is primarily known from the writings of Sidonius Apollinaris, a Gallo-Roman aristocrat and poet, who briefly alludes to it in his letters. Though the details remain obscure, it appears to have been an attempt to seize imperial power or establish a rival faction against the growing influence of Ricimer.
