= Agricola (vir illustris) =

Arvernian noble

Agricola (fl. 466 – 485) was an Arvernian noble and son of the Western Roman Emperor Avitus.

== Biography ==
Agricola was the son of Avitus, and therefore the brother of Ecdicius and Papianilla. His grandfather was probably the Agricola who was consul in 421. Agricola was related to the poet Sidonius Apollinaris, who married Papianilla, and to Ruricius of Limoges, who was his father-in-law. He married and had a son, Parthenius, who gave him some grandsons. Two letters are addressed to him by Sidonius Apollinaris (Epistles I.2, 453/466; II.12, before 469), and one by Ruricius (II.32, 485/506).

He was a vir inlustris. When he received Ruricius' letter, he had recently been ordained a priest.

== Bibliography ==
- Martindale, John R., ed. (1980). "Agricola 2". The Prosopography of the Later Roman Empire: Volume II, AD 395–527. Cambridge: Cambridge University Press. p. 37. ISBN 0-521-20159-4.
