= Papianilla =

Papianilla may refer to:

- Papianilla (wife of Tonantius Ferreolus), Roman noblewoman
- Papianilla (wife of Sidonius Apollinaris) (floruit 455), Roman noblewoman
