= Tonantius Ferreolus (senator) =

Roman senator (c. 440–450 to after 517)

Tonantius Ferreolus (French: Tonance Ferréol; c. 440-450 to after 517 AD) was a Gallo-Roman senator who held the rank of vir clarissimus.

== Life ==
Tonantius Ferreolus the Younger, a senator and prominent aristocrat of Narbo (modern Narbonne), is mentioned in a letter by his friend Sidonius Apollinaris. The letter, written to a mutual acquaintance named Donidius before Sidonius became Bishop of Clermont in 469, recounts a "most delightful time" spent at the country estates of the Ferreolus family.

The hosts of the visit were Tonantius Ferreolus the Elder (the Praetorian Prefect of Gaul and father of the senator) and his brother Apollinaris, whom Sidonius described as "the most charming hosts in the world." The visit took place at their two adjoining estates, Prusianum and Vorocingus. While there, the younger Tonantius and his brothers also displayed notable hospitality. Sidonius recalled that the young men "turned out of their beds for us because we could not be always dragging our gear about," praising them as "surely the elect among the nobles of our own age."

Sidonius also attests that Tonantius was both a friend and relative. He was the son of Tonantius Ferreolus the Elder and Papianilla. Based on onomastic evidence and family connections described by Sidonius, historians believe this Papianilla belonged to the Arvernian family of the Aviti. She was likely a generation older than Sidonius's wife, who shared the same name.

Tonantius married Industria of Narbonne. Her birth is estimated between 450 and 460, and their marriage likely took place after 475. It is a widely held but unproven hypothesis that she was the daughter of Flavius Probus, a Gallo-Roman senator, and his wife Eulalia, who was a first cousin of Sidonius Apollinaris.

Following the end of direct Roman administration in Gaul, Tonantius retained his senatorial status, a customary practice among aristocratic families under Visigothic and later Merovingian rule. His rank was formally recognised with the title vir clarissimus ("most eminent man"), reflecting his family's standing and his father's former position as Praetorian Prefect.

No ecclesiastical offices are recorded for Tonantius, nor is there evidence that he held positions under the Visigothic kings before the Battle of Vouillé in 507. The suggestion that he may have continued in his father's former role of Rector Galliarum is speculative, as it is uncertain whether the Visigoths maintained that office. One interpretation of a document by Cassiodorus suggests he may have been appointed Defensor Pedensis (a royal official in Pedena, modern-day Croatia) in 511 by the Ostrogothic king Theodoric the Great, who then controlled parts of southern Gaul.

Sidonius records that Tonantius had brothers, though their names are not preserved. Modern genealogical reconstructions remain uncertain as to whether the "Ferreolus of Narbo," cited as the husband of Industria and father of Saint Firminus, was Tonantius himself or an otherwise unrecorded brother.

Living in Narbo, a key city of the Visigothic kingdom, Tonantius likely remained loyal to Kings Euric and Alaric II before the Battle of Vouillé. His involvement in the battle is unknown. After the Visigoths' defeat, Narbo and Septimania came under the protection of the Ostrogothic Kingdom of Italy, ruled by Theodoric the Great. Following Theodoric's death in 526, Ostrogothic influence waned and Narbo returned to Visigothic control. In the early 530s, the Franks conquered the neighbouring Burgundian kingdom and Provence, but despite occasional Frankish incursions, Septimania remained Visigothic.

During Tonantius's lifetime, his family began to assert control over the Bishopric of Uzès, a common strategy among senatorial families. This influence was confirmed when his son, Saint Firminus, became bishop of the see, within which the family's villa at Prusianum was located.

Although Tonantius is not remembered for a major political or ecclesiastical act, his principal achievement was preserving his family's status and property through successive political upheavals. This continuity, mirrored by other Gallo-Roman aristocratic families, was significant in maintaining Roman legal customs, administrative practices, and cultural identity within the new Germanic kingdoms, shaping the political and social structures of the Merovingian era.

Knowledge of his sixth-century descendants comes primarily from two sources: the hagiographies of the Bishops of Uzès and records of noblemen such as Ferreolus, proposed father of Ansbert and Agilulf. The presence of this branch in Austrasia suggests a relocation from Visigothic Gaul, either voluntary to seek Frankish patronage or as political hostages, a practice noted by Gregory of Tours, who recounts his relative Attalus being held in Trier.

This Austrasian Ferreolus would have held considerable prestige. His grandfather, Tonantius Ferreolus the Elder, had been Praetorian Prefect of Gaul in 451, and the family traced its lineage to consular ancestors, most notably Flavius Afranius Syagrius, consul in 382 under Theodosius I. Such distinguished heritage may have enabled a strategic marriage, possibly with a princess of the Ripuarian Franks.

The family's relocation may have originated not from Narbo, which remained Visigothic, but from Frankish-controlled Provence. There, their kinsman Parthenius rose to prominence. By 548, he held authority as Patrician (governor) of Provence and was a senior financial official in Trier. As a high-ranking Gallo-Roman, Parthenius was in a position to assist his relatives' integration into the Austrasian elite.

Earlier genealogical studies proposed that this family was ancestral to Adalrich (Eticho), seventh-century Duke of Alsace. Modern scholarship, however, rejects this theory, attributing the origins of the Etichonid dynasty instead to the Burgundian aristocracy, likely descending from Duke Amalgar.

=== Issue ===
By his wife Industria, Tonantius Ferreolus is believed to have had the following children:

Ferreolus (hypothetical) — A proposed son, thought to have been a senator and the father of the Gallo-Roman senator Ansbertus. This reconstruction, advanced by historian Christian Settipani, is based on circumstantial evidence:

- Paul the Deacon's Deeds of the Bishops of Metz states that Bishop Agilulf of Metz, Ansbertus's brother, was the "son of a senator," but does not name the father.
- The Ferreoli, originally based in Narbo, appear to have relocated to Frankish Austrasia by the mid-6th century. Their influence shifted to the region around Metz and Uzès, under Frankish control.
- Settipani notes the recurrence of the names Ferreolus and Ansbert in family-influenced bishoprics and cautiously draws on later, sometimes confused, 9th-century genealogies that attempted to link Carolingian figures to this lineage.

Based on this, Settipani proposes that the unnamed senator mentioned by Paul the Deacon was a Ferreolus, son of Tonantius Ferreolus and Industria, making Ansbertus their grandson. This differs from an earlier 1947 theory by David H. Kelley, which suggested Ansbertus was a direct son of Tonantius. Settipani further speculates that this Ferreolus may have married a Ripuarian Frankish princess, facilitating the family's integration into the Frankish elite.

Saint Firminus (c. 480–553) — Bishop of Uzès from 538 until his death in 553. His feast day is observed on 11 October. He succeeded his uncle Bishop Roricius and participated in the Councils of Orléans (541, 549) and a council in Paris (551), confirming his activity during that period.

== References and sources ==
- Sidonius Apollinaris, The Letters of Sidonius (Oxford: Clarendon, 1915), pp. clx-clxxxiii
- Christian Settipani, Les Ancêtres de Charlemagne (France: Éditions Christian, 1989).
- Christian Settipani, Continuite Gentilice et Continuite Familiale Dans Les Familles Senatoriales Romaines A L'epoque Imperiale, Mythe et Realite, Addenda I - III (juillet 2000- octobre 2002) (n.p.: Prosopographica et Genealogica, 2002).
- Ralph Whitney Mathisen, "The Ecclesiastical Aristocracy of Fifth Century Gaul: A Regional Analysis of Family Structure." Doctoral Dissertation, University of Wisconsin. University Microfilms (1979).
- Christian Settipani, "L'apport de l'onomastique dans l'etude des genealogies carolingiennes" in ONOMASTIQUE ET PARENTE DANS L'OCCIDENT MEDIEVAL, Ed. K. S. B. Rohan & C. Settipani, Prosopographica et Genealogica (2000)
- T. Stanford Mommaerts & David H. Kelley, "The Anicii of Gaul and Rome." in Fifth-Century Gaul: A Crisis of Identity? edited by John Drinkwater and Hugh Elton. Cambridge, 1992.
- Gregory of Tours, The History of the Franks translated by Lewis Thorpe. Penguin. (1977) (free Latin edition)
- J. R. Martindale, The Prosopography of the Later Roman Empire, Volume II AD 395 - 527, Cambridge University Press, 1980.
