= Thaumastus =

Thaumastus (born c. 400) was a friend and uncle of Sidonius Apollinaris. His brother, the elder Apollinaris was born around 405 and was the praetorian prefect of Gaul under Valentinian III between 425 and 455. Thaumastus and his brother were both sons of another Apollinaris, praetorian prefect of Gaul before 409 and were friends with his successor Decimus Rusticus. Thaumastus was associated with Tonantius Ferreolus in the impeachment of Arvandus. He was the father of Eulalia, born in 425, married before 450 to Flavius Probus, Roman Senator.

He seems to be a descendant of yet another Apollinaris, praetorian prefect of Gaul under Constantine II between 337 and 340.
