= Priscus Valerianus =

Priscus Valerianus (flourished around 450–456) was a Roman praetorian prefect of patrician rank, connected to both the emperor Avitus and Bishop Eucherius of Lyons.

Valerianus served as praetorian prefect of Gaul sometime prior to 456, when Sidonius Apollinaris sent him a selection of his verses, praising him as a critic. Eucherius of Lyons dedicated his Epistula Paranetica ad Valerianum cognatum de contemptu mundi et saecularis philosophiae to Valerianus. His daughter was married to the orator Pragmatius.

== Sources ==
- Martindale, John R., ed. (1980). "Valerianus 8". The Prosopography of the Later Roman Empire: Volume II, AD 395–527. Cambridge: Cambridge University Press. pp. 1142–1143. ISBN 0-521-20159-4.
