= Apollinaris (praefect) =

Praetorian Perfect of Gaul, Roman Empire

Apollinaris (Latin: Apollinarius) was Praetorian Prefect of Gaul from May 408 or earlier until 409 AD, when he was succeeded by his friend Decimus Rusticus. He was the grandfather of Sidonius Apollinaris and was the son or grandson of another Apollinaris who was Prefect of Gaul under Constantine II between 337 and 340.

== Life ==
Little is known of Apollinaris' early life. It is suggested that he was born in about 380 AD in Lugdunum (modern Lyon).

In 407, Flavius Claudius Constantinus was declared emperor in Roman Britain and crossed the channel into Gaul (modern France), taking all of the mobile troops from Britain under Gerontius. With a mixture of fighting and diplomacy Constantine stabilised the situation and established control over Gaul and Hispania (modern Spain and Portugal) in May 408. He had made Arles his capital, where he appointed Apollinaris as chief minister (with the title of praetorian prefect). The sitting emperor of the Western Roman Empire, Honorius, sent an army under Sarus the Goth to expel Constantine's forces. After initial victories, however, Sarus was repulsed.

Apollinaris was the father two children: Apollinaris, who was Prefect of Gaul under Valentinian III (Sidonius recalls being present with his father at the installation of Astyrius as consul in 449), and Thaumastus, another Prefect of Gaul under Valentinian III and father of Eulalia, born in 425.

His tenure lasted until 409, when he was ousted (possibly by Constantine III) in favor of Decimus Rusticus, who was also Master of the Offices. When Honorius appointed a new general, Flavius Constantius in another attempt to suppress Constantine, he defeated Constantine and besieged Arles. Despite Constantius' assurances that Constantine would be able to safely retire to a clerical office, Constantius had him imprisoned, and further had him beheaded during his return to Ravenna, in either August or September 411. Decimus Rusticus was also captured and put to death.

== Descendants ==
Apollinaris' grandson, Sidonius Apollinaris, was the son-in-law to Emperor Avitus and was the Bishop of Clermont in 469, which he retained until his death in the 480s.

== Administration ==
Apollinaris served as the Praetorian Prefect of Gaul, a position of significant power and responsibility in the Late Roman Empire. The Praetorian Prefecture of Gaul was one of four large prefectures into which the Late Roman Empire was divided. It comprised not only Gaul but also Roman Britain, Hispania, and Mauretania Tingitana in Africa Proconsulare.
