= Ecdicius =

Arverni aristocrat, senator and magister militum praesentalis

Ecdicius Avitus (c. 420 – after 475) was an Arverni aristocrat, senator, and magister militum praesentalis from 474 until 475.

As a son of the Emperor Avitus, Ecdicius was educated at Arvernis (modern Clermont-Ferrand), where he lived and owned some land. In the 460s he was one of the richest and most important persons in the western Empire and he was present at the court of Anthemius until 469.

Ecdicius and his brother-in-law Sidonius Apollinaris, the Bishop of Clermont, took charge of the defence of the Auvergne against the Visigoths from 471 to 475. The Visigothic king Euric besieged many cities, but Ecdicius, with a private army of horsemen paid for out of his own wealth, brought provisions to those cities, lifted their sieges, and fed a multitude of poor. The size of his warband seems to have been quite small --- he broke a Visigothic siege of Clermont-Ferrand with only eighteen horsemen, or ten according to the non-contemporary account of Gregory of Tours.

Ecdicius also obtained the submission of Chilperic II of Burgundy on behalf of the Empire.

In 471 Anthemius sent an army into Gaul under the command of his son Anthemiolus against the Visigoths, but he was defeated near Arles. By 473 the Visigoths had captured Arles and Marseille, and they appeared poised for an invasion of Italia itself. Ecdicius was elevated in 474 to the rank of patrician by the new emperor Julius Nepos, and invested with the title magister militum praesentialis, apparently with the intent to wage war against the Visigoths; when Sidonius learned of this promotion, he shared his hopes with his wife Papianilla that Ecdicius might gain victories and be rewarded with the Consulate.

However, in 475, just as Ecdicius embarked on his campaign against the Visigoths, he was recalled to Italy by Julius and Flavius Orestes replaced him as head of the Roman army. The emperor then exchanged the Auvergne for Provence, giving the Visigoths the territories they had long desired. The reason for Nepos's about face is puzzling, as Ralph W. Mathisen admits before accusing the Senate in Rome of being responsible.

After he was replaced, Ecdicius completely disappears from the historical record. A letter written by Sidonius Apollinaris survives, in which he pleads with his brother-in-law to return to the Auvergne; but whether or not Ecdicius did return – or even if Sidonius sent the letter – is unknown. Some evidence suggests that he remained in Italy: there is a letter in the Variae of Cassiodorus (2.4.22), written after the Battle of Vouillé in 507, concerning the sons of one Ecdicius who wanted to return to Gaul where they had property; in a 1984 article Mathisen argued for the identification, pointing out that "not only is the Arvernian Ecdicius known to have been in Rome earlier, but Ecdicius also is a rare name."

== Notes ==
Military offices
Preceded by Gundobad	Magister militum of the Western Roman army 474–475	Succeeded by Orestes
