= Ragnagild =

Wife of Gothic king Euric

Ragnagild (also called Ragnahilda, Ragnahild) (5th-century – fl. 485) was a Visigoth queen consort by marriage to king Euric (466–484). Additionally, she was the mother of Alaric II. She was said to be the daughter of a king, though this king is not named; some have speculated that she might have been an Arian.

Ragnagild is known from the work of Sidonius Apollinaris to have acted as the patron of poets and artists. She could speak Latin, was apparently educated, and is speculated to have influenced state affairs. Around the late 460s, for instance, a Gallo-Roman nobleman - described by histories as her client - presented her with a silver bowl, featuring an engraving of a poem in her honour. This gift aimed to earn her favour, as the nobleman petitioned her.
