= Apollinaris of Clermont =

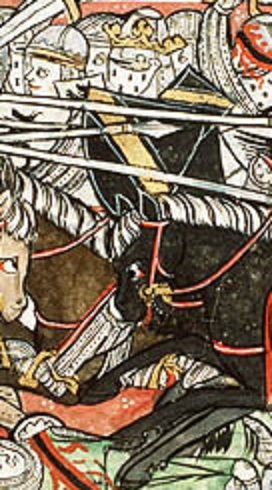
- Apollinaris of Clermont at the Battle of Vouillé.

Count of Auvergne
- Reign: 489-515
- Predecessor: Victorius
- Successor: Hortensius
- Died: 515
- Issue: Arcadius
- Father: Sidonius Apollinaris
- Mother: Papianilla

Apollinaris (died 515) was a Count of Auvergne who led an Auvergnat army for the Visigoths in the Battle of Vouillé, and was bishop of Clermont for four months before his death.

== Life ==
Apollinaris was the son of the aristocrat and poet Sidonius Apollinaris and Papianilla. A number of contemporary Romano-Gallic aristocrats were his cousins, including bishops Avitus of Vienne and Ruricius of Limoges.

Earliest records of Apollinaris are in the letters of his father Sidonius. Although Apollinaris is the recipient of one letter (Epistulae III.13), E.H. Warmington considers it a "show-piece" which was never actually sent to him. Sidonius mentions Apollinaris in several of his letters: two allude to his youth (in V.11, he describes Apollinaris as "in these budding years of manhood", and in V.9 hopes that Apollinaris would have children), another mentions Apollinaris' love of hunting, and in the last laments his disinterest in literature. Despite his father's opinion, Apollinaris did at least once display an interest in literature: according to a letter of Ruricius, he helped to distribute his father's writings.

After the Visigothic capture of Clermont, Apollinaris fled the town with comes Victorius to Italy; there Victorius was killed, and Apollinaris was taken captive, but managed to escape with his servant and return home.

Apollinaris apparently got along with king Alaric II far better than Alaric's predecessor, for Gregory of Tours records that Apollinaris led a militia raised in Clermont on the Visigothic side of the Battle of Vouillé in 507. Although several letters written to him from his other cousin, bishop Avitus of Vienne, are dated to the years after that battle, Apollinaris' activities until 515 are unknown. In that year, with the help of his sister Alcima and his wife Placidana, he was appointed bishop of Clermont by the Frankish king Theuderic I. However, he held the office only four months before he died.

He was survived by a son, Arcadius, of whom Gregory of Tours tells several unflattering stories.

French nobility
Preceded by Victorius	Count of Auvergne; 489-515	Succeeded by Hortensius
