= Basilius (Bagaudae) =

5th-century leader of the Bagaudae in Spain

Basilius was the leader of the Bagaudae in Spain in the mid-5th century. He supported the Suevian king Rechiar against the West Roman emperor Valentinian III. The Spanish bishop of Chaves Hydatius mentions him in his Chronicles and gives some information about his performance in history.

== History ==
In the Roman Empire, rebellious farmers were called Bagaudae. In troubled times when the population suffered greatly from raids by barbarians, civil wars or misharvests, farmers who had lost everything formed armed groups to protect themselves. In doing so, they provided themselves with living by roberying and looting.

The raids of the Suevi king Rechila in the 1930s and 1940s had a disruptive effect on the Spanish provinces of Hispania Carthaginensis and Hispania Tarraconensis. Around that time, Bagaudae are reported in the Ebro valley. That same Rechila formed an alliance with rebellious farmers. His son Rechila took Bagaudae as mercenaries in his army from 448 during his operations in Carthaginensis and Tarraconensis. Basilius was a Bagauden leader with whom he concluded a treaty.

In the spring of 449, the rebels of Basilius attacked a contingent Aquitaniaan Goths in Turiaso. The Goths were defeated and the survivors fled to a church where they were slaughtered. The bishop of the city, Leo, was also a victim of the massacre. In July 449, the Bagaudae-Sueven coalition plundered the city of Caesaraugusta and conquered Ilerda.

Further details about Basilius' life are missing. Historians believe he was killed in action by the Gothic general Frederick or two years later during the Gothic War in Spain (456).

== Bibliography ==
- Kulikowski, Michael (1998). The End of Roman Spain (PhD thesis). University of Toronto. ISBN 9780612339071.
