= Tonantius Ferreolus (prefect) =

Praetorian prefect of Gaul

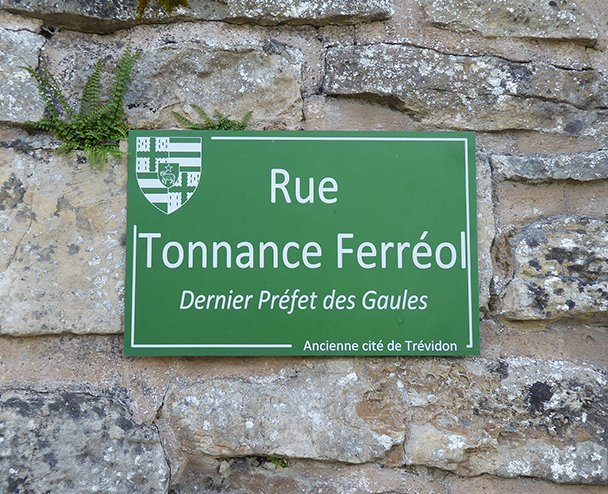

Tonantius Ferreolus (c. 390 – 475) was the praetorian prefect of Gaul (praefectus praetorio Galliarum) from 451.

== Life ==
Tonantius Ferreolus lived in the Gard valley on his estate of Prusianum and possessed additional estates at Segodunum in Rodez. His father was Ferreolus, a Roman Senator. One of his ancestors during the 4th century was a patrician. He was possibly related to Sidonius Apollinaris. His mother was a clarissima femina and daughter of Afranius Syagrius, consul in 382.

As praetorian prefect of Gaul he was instrumental in organizing Gaul for the successful defence against the invasion of Attila and the Hun army. At the same time he diplomatically restrained the Patrician and Magister Militum Flavius Aetius from levying excessive taxes against the people of the Gallic Prefecture, receiving public acclaim for his efforts. Following the defeat of the Huns by a Roman-Gothic alliance, Ferreolus resisted the attempts of Visigothic king Thorismund to take advantage of the situation to obtain more territory or privileges in 452–453 when that king besieged Arles. He was associated with Thaumastus and Petronius in conducting the impeachment of Arvandus, a successor in the Gallic Prefecture who had behaved extortionately toward the people of Gaul and who had written a letter to Visigothic King Euric encouraging that monarch to break with his allegiance to Emperor Anthemius and partition Gaul with the Burgundians, presumably with Arvandus's connivance. This prosecution was successful in obtaining a conviction though Arvandus was reprieved, to some extent, it would appear, through the good offices of Sidonius Apollinaris, from execution and he was merely exiled. Ferreolus was apparently living a life of religious contemplation after 469 though there is no indication he ever took orders. He is the first clearly attested historical person bearing either the name Ferreolus or Tonantius, though there are two much earlier martyrs of the name. However his father's marriage into the Syagrii and his own patrician ancestry suggest that the family was well known and powerful under a different name or names during the third and fourth centuries at least. The family was to retain considerable importance and exert considerable influence in Gaul for over a century and perhaps two after the fall of the Roman Empire.

He had married Papianilla, herself clarissima femina, born c. 415, a niece of Emperor Avitus and the first cousin of another Papianilla, wife of Sidonius Apollinaris, and they had many children, among whom Tonantius Ferreolus. She was a partner who shared his troubles, according to Sidonius. Tonantius Ferreolus had at least three sons: Tonantius Ferreolus who was a Gallo-Roman Senator at Narbonne, Ruricius who became Bishop of Uzes between Probatius and Firminus and at least one son whose name is not attested. It is not known whether he had any daughters or whether more than these two sons survived to adulthood.

He had issue:

- Tonantius Ferreolus (senator)
- Unattested son.
- Unattested daughter married to Aspasius of Auch.
- Ruricius (d. 506, 507 or shortly after 507), Bishop of Uzès. He was called Bishop of Uzes in the Life of Firminus. Based on this occurrence, Stanford Mommaerts and David Kelley postulated that "Ruricius of Uzes" was a brother of Tonantius, a son of Papianilla, wife of the elder Tonantius and that Ruricius of Limoges was her brother and Tonantius's uncle. A significant number of researchers agree with this, while Mathisen and Settipani have concluded that the octogenarian Bishop Ruricius referred to in the Life of Firminus is in fact Ruricius of Limoges. Settipani has suggested that Papianilla was the sister of Hiberia, wife of Ruricius of Limoges and daughter of Gallo Roman Senator Ommatius of Clermont. Given that a Ferreolus would succeed Ruricius and his descendants to the Episcopal chair of Limoges and commission the epitaphs of Ruricius I and II (hence he was a kinsman and probably a descendant), it is likely there are aspects of the relationship between the Ruriciids and Ferreoli that are not yet explained by either theory.

== Sources ==
- Sidonius Apollinaris, The Letters of Sidonius (Oxford: Clarendon, 1915), pp. clx-clxxxiii
- Settipani, Christian. "Ruricius, premier évêque de Limoges et ses alliances familiales." Francia, 18 (1991).
- Christian Settipani, Continuité gentilice et continuité sénatoriale dans les familles sénatoriales romaines à l'époque impériale, "Mythe et Realite, Addenda I - III (juillet 2000- octobre 2002)" (n.p.: Prosopographica et Genealogica, 2002).
- Martindale, John R., ed. (1980). The Prosopography of the Later Roman Empire: Volume II, AD 395–527. Cambridge: Cambridge University Press. ISBN 0-521-20159-4.
- Mathisen, Ralph Whitney. "The Ecclesiastical Aristocracy of Fifth Century Gaul: A Regional Analysis of Family Structure." Doctoral Dissertation, University of Wisconsin. University Microfilms (1979).
