= Papianilla (wife of Sidonius Apollinaris) =

Roman Gaul aristocrat

Papianilla (floruit 455 CE) was an aristocrat of Roman Gaul. She was the daughter of future Western Roman Emperor Eparchius Avitus, and wife of bishop, author, and letter-writer Sidonius Apollinaris.

Her father, Eparchius Avitus, rose from the Gallo-Roman senatorial aristocracy to become Western Roman Emperor from 455 CE to 456 CE. Papianilla had two brothers, Agricola and Ecdicius, and possibly some sisters; she was related to another Papianilla (wife of the prefect Tonantius Ferreolus). The family lived in the Auvergne region.

Before her father's rise to the throne (455), she married Sidonius Apollinaris, another aristocrat, who may have been a distant maternal relative. The marriage was highly advantageous for Sidonius, making him part of the most powerful family in the region. They had three or four children: Apollinaris, Severiana, Roscia and Alcima (the latter, mentioned only in Gregory of Tours and not in Sidonius' letters, being possibly another name for Severiana or Roscia). A number of Sidonius' letters were addressed to her.

Papianilla brought her husband the estate called Avitacum in Auvergne. Her husband gave away silver vessels from their home to the poor, but she criticised him so he bought them back.

== Sources ==
- "Papianilla 2", Prosopography of the Later Roman Empire, Volume 2, p. 830.
