= Iohannes (consul 456) =

Iohannes (fl. 456) was a politician of the Eastern Roman Empire.

== Biography ==
Iohannes is known only through the inscriptions that recorded him as the Consul of year 456, when he was chosen by the Eastern court to hold this office together with Varanes; in the West, however, he was not recognised, as the consulate was held by Emperor Avitus.

Preceded by Flavius Placidus Valentinianus Augustus; Procopius Anthemius	Consul of the Roman Empire; 456 with Varanes and Avitus	Succeeded by Flavius Constantinus, Flavius Rufus
