= Papianilla (wife of Tonantius Ferreolus) =

Papianilla (born c. 415) was a Roman noblewoman.

She was the wife of Tonantius Ferreolus. Another Papianilla, the wife of the poet Sidonius Apollinaris, was a relative of hers.

She had Tonantius Ferreolus and other sons.

== Sources ==
- Martindale, John R., ed. (1980). "Papianilla 1". The Prosopography of the Later Roman Empire: Volume II, AD 395–527. Cambridge: Cambridge University Press. p. 830. ISBN 0-521-20159-4.
