= Constantinus (consul 457) =

Roman politician

Flavius Constantinus (Greek: Κωνσταντίνος; fl. 447–464) was a politician of the Eastern Roman Empire, consul and three times praetorian prefect of the East.

== Life ==
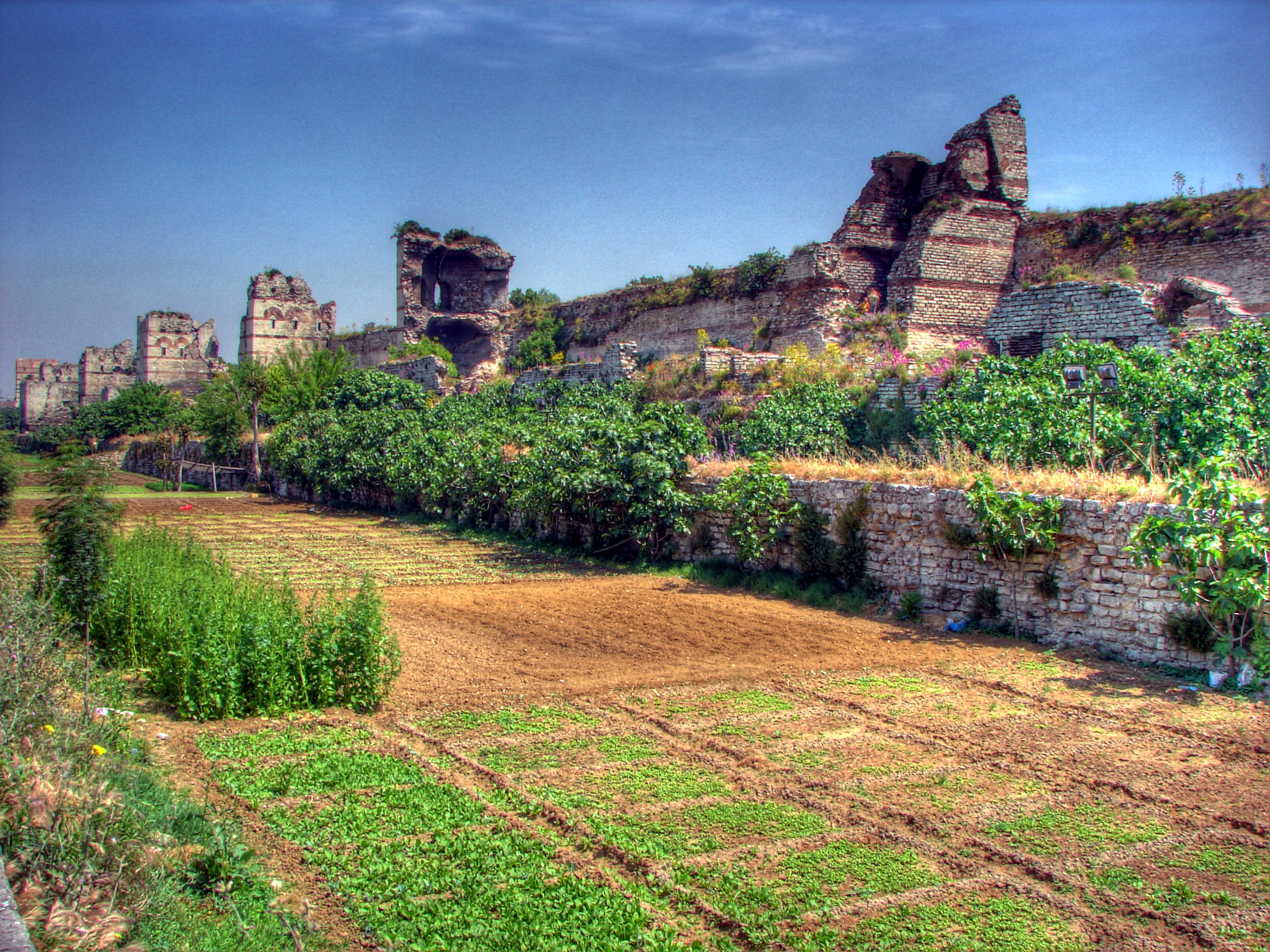
Portion of the Walls of Constantinople, damaged by an earthquake in January 447 and restored by Constantinus in sixty days.

A native of Laodicea of Phrygia, Constantinus was named praetorian prefect of the East for the first time around 447, when he restored the Walls of Constantinople, which had been damaged by an earthquake that January. As the Huns of Attila were moving towards Constantinople, Constantinus mobilised the factions of the Hippodrome of Constantinople to gather 16,000 workers: the Blues worked the stretch of walls from the Gate of Blachernae to the Gate of Myriandrion, the Greens from there to the Sea of Marmara; in sixty days, by the end of March, the walls were restored and the moat cleaned. A bilingual inscription was erected to celebrate the works. While in office, he received a letter from Theodoret of Cyrrhus, asking for a reduction of the taxation on his city, while another was received after he left office.

After leaving office in 451, he participated in some sessions of the Council of Chalcedon. In 456 he was appointed prefect for the second time.

Constantinus was appointed consul in 457, with Rufus as his colleague (they were both chosen by the Eastern court), then prefect of the East for the third time in 459. He received the title of patricius after 457.

In 464/465 he was sent as an envoy to the Sassanid Persian king Peroz I. He waited at Edessa, then was received at Peroz's court. The Persians had several complaints, and asked for Roman financial contributions for the defence of the Caspian Gates, but the Romans refused and Constantinus was dismissed without achieving anything.

== Sources ==
- Martindale, John R., ed. (1980). "Constantinus 22". The Prosopography of the Later Roman Empire: Volume II, AD 395–527. Cambridge: Cambridge University Press. pp. 317–318. ISBN 0-521-20159-4.

Preceded by Avitus Augustus; Iohannes	Roman consul 457 with Rufus	Succeeded by Leo Augustus; Majorian Augustus
