= Decimus Rusticus =

Decimus Junius Rusticus (sometimes Rusticus Decimus) of Treves (then Augusta Treverorum) and Lyon (Lugdunum) (c. 370 – before 423) was a Master of the Offices and the praetorian prefect of Gaul between 409 and 410 or 413. He was one of those responsible for the withdrawal from Britannia.

== Life ==
In 407, the Roman army in Britain chose as their leader Flavius Claudius Constantinus. He crossed the Channel to the continent, and by May 408 had made Arles his capital, where he appointed Apollinaris, grandfather of Sidonius Apollinaris, as prefect. This was probably due to his hereditary claim to Gaul.

=== Withdraw from Britain ===
In 409, the Germans began a revolt against Constantine with reinforcements from east of the Rhine. Part of his military forces were in Hispania, making them unavailable for action in Gaul, and some of those in Gaul were swayed against him by loyalist Roman generals. The remaining forces Britain were thus called into Gaul. Severe Saxon raids followed that year, and Apollinaris was ousted in favour of Rusticus as praetorian prefect of Gaul.

Perhaps feeling they had no hope of relief under Constantine, both the Romano-Britons and some of the Gauls expelled Constantine's magistrates in early 410, who rejected Roman law and armed themselves to ensure their own safety. Honorius, aimed at reclaiming his dominion from Constantine and the Visigoths, later sent a rescript to British communities in 410 telling them to look to their own defence.

It is assumed that the remaining Roman magistrates usurped power in the essentially lawless province as de facto warlords, but little evidence supports that the magistrates attacked one another who had differing native ideologies. The result was the foundation of Sub-Roman kingdoms which were slowly established in the ashes of Roman Britain, and by 460, the entirety of the province was divided between small local kingdoms ruled by Roman-claimed descended Brittonic leaders. Although Roman law, culture, and societal structure remained in the island, it evolved and merged with ancient Celtic traditions.

=== Death and legacy ===
In either August or September 411, Honorius appointed a new general, Flavius Constantius in another attempt to suppress Constantine, who successfully besieged Arles. Despite Constantius's assurances that Constantine would be able to safely retire to a clerical office, Constantius had both him and Rusticus imprisoned, and further had them beheaded during his return to Ravenna.

About him, Sidonius Apollinaris to his friend Aquilinus:

I find it certainly to my advantage, friend capable of every virtue, and I trust you will feel the same, that we should have as many ties to bind us as we have reasons for being united. Such ties are hereditary in our families; I do but recall the experience of the past. Let me summon as my witnesses our grandfathers Rusticus and Apollinaris, whom like fortunes and aversions united in a noble friendship. They had a similar taste in letters, their characters were alike; they had enjoyed similar dignities and undergone the same dangers. They were equally agreed in detesting the inconstancy of Constantine, the irresolution of Jovinus, the perfidy of Gerontius; both singling out the fault proper to each person, and both finding in Dardanus the sum of all existing vices.

If we come down to the years between their time and our own, we find our fathers brought up together from their tender youth until they came to manhood. In Honorius's reign, as tribunes and secretaries, they served abroad together in such close comradeship that among all the grounds of their agreement the fact that their own fathers had been friends appeared to be the least. Under Valentinian, one of the two ruled all Gaul, the other only a region of it; even so they managed to balance their dignities with a fraternal equilibrium; the one who held the lower rank had seniority in office. And now the old tradition comes down to us grandsons, whose dearest care it should be to prevent the affection of our parents and our forefathers from suffering any diminution in our persons. But there are ties of all kinds, over and above that of this hereditary friendship, which needs must bring us close together; we are linked by equality of years no less than by identity of birthplace; we played and learned together, shared the same discipline and relaxation, and were trained by the same rule. So then, for what remains of life now that our years touch upon the threshold of age, let us under the providence of God be two persons with but a single mind; and let us instil into our sons the same mutual regard: let us see that the objects which they desire and refuse, pursue or shun, are the same. It would indeed crown our vows if the boys who bear the honoured names of Rusticus and Apollinaris renewed within their breasts the hearts of those illustrious ancestors. Farewell.

== Marriage and descendants ==
He married before 400 Artemia (b. c. 375), the daughter of Artemia of Clermont-Ferrand (then Augustonemetum) in Auvergne (Arvennia) (born say 355), and they were the parents of a son (b. c. 400), who was a Vicarius of a province in Gaul under the father of Sidonius Apollinaris between 423 and 448.

This son then married Tullia of Lyon (born say 410), daughter of Eucherius of Lyon and wife Gallia(?), and they were the parents of Aquilinus (c. 430 – c. 470), a nobleman at Lyon, schoolfellow and friend of Sidonius Apollinaris and the father of St. Viventiolus and his brother St. Rusticus, Archbishop of Lyon.

== Sources and references ==
- Bishop of Tours Gregory, Historia Francorum (The History of the Franks) (London, England: Penguin Books, Ltd., 1974).
- Sidonius Apollinaris, The Letters of Sidonius (Oxford: Clarendon, 1915) (orig.), pp. clx-clxxxiii; List of Correspondents, Notes, V.ix.1.
