= Theodoric I =

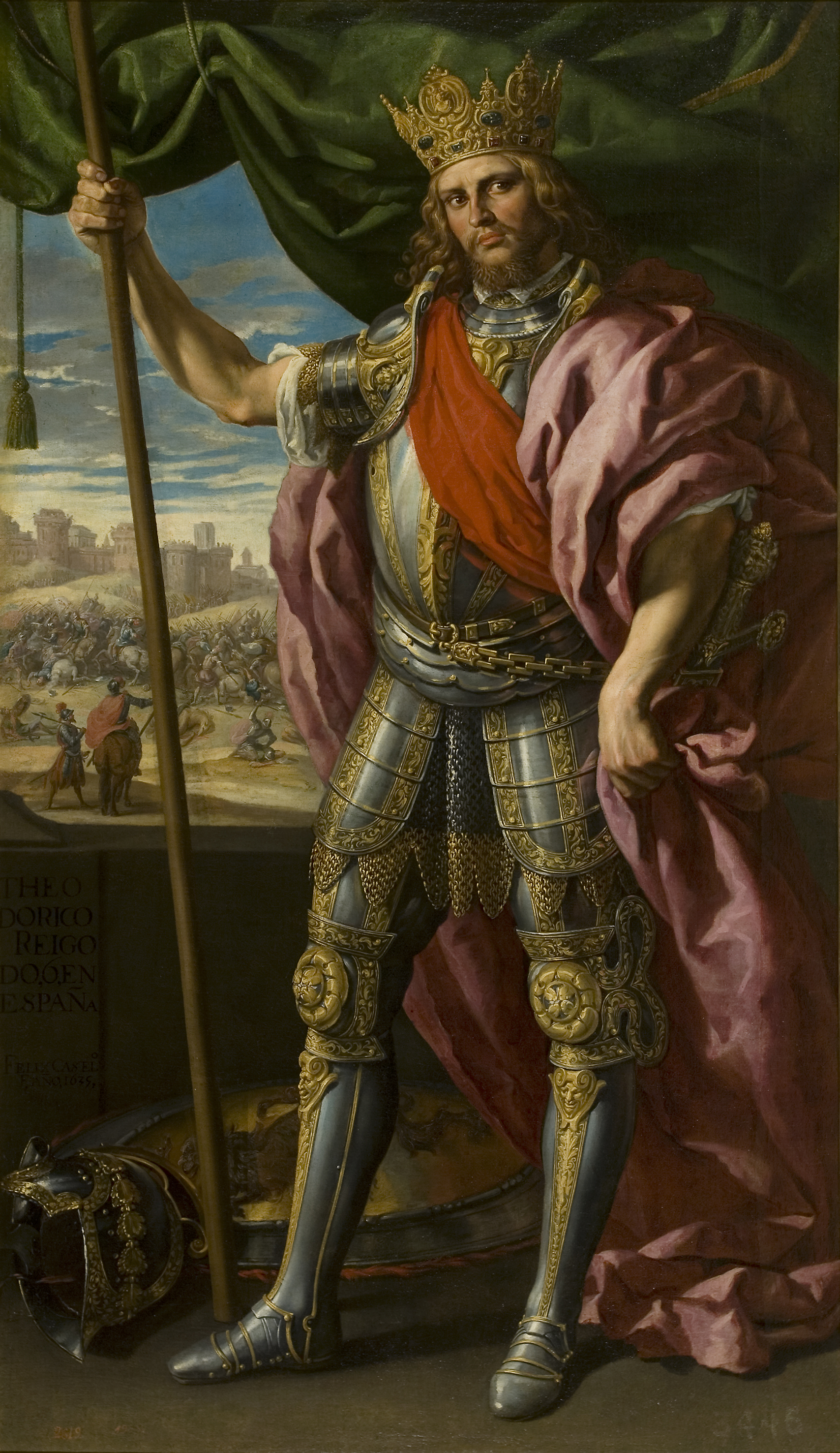
- Posthumous portrait of Theodoric I painted in 1635

King of the Visigoths
- Reign: 418 – June 451 AD
- Coronation: 418 AD
- Predecessor: Wallia
- Successor: Thorismund
- Born: c. 390
- Died: 20 or 24 June 451 (aged 60–61); Battle of the Catalaunian Plains
- Burial: Tomb of Theodoric, Poix, Marne, France
- Issue: Thorismund; Theodoric II; Frederic; Euric I Retimer; Himnerith; Daughter (unknown name)
- Dynasty: Balt
- Religion: Arianism

Theodoric I (Gothic: Þiudarīks; Latin: Theodericus; c. 390 or 393 – 20 or 24 June 451) was the king of the Visigoths from 418 to 451. Theodoric is famous for his part in stopping Attila the Hun at the Battle of the Catalaunian Plains in 451, despite having been killed during the engagement.

== Early career ==
In 418 AD he succeeded King Wallia. The Romans had ordered King Wallia to move his people from Iberia to Gaul. As king, Theodoric completed the settlements of the Visigoths in Gallia Aquitania II, Novempopulana, and Gallia Narbonensis, and then used the declining power of the Roman Empire to extend his territory to the south.

After the death of Emperor Honorius and the usurpation of Joannes in 423, internal power struggles broke out in the Roman Empire. Theodoric used this situation and tried to capture the important road junction Arelate, but the magister militum Aëtius, who was assisted by the Huns, was able to save the city.

The Visigoths concluded a treaty and were given Gallic noblemen as hostages. The later Emperor Avitus visited Theodoric, lived at his court, and taught his sons.

== Expansion to the Mediterranean ==
Because the Romans had to fight against the Franks, who plundered Cologne and Trier in 435, and because of other events, Theodoric saw the chance to conquer Narbo Martius in 436 to obtain access to the Mediterranean Sea and the roads to the Pyrenees. But Litorius, with the aid of the Huns, prevented the capture of the city and drove the Visigoths back to their capital Tolosa. Theodoric's offer of peace was refused, but the king won the decisive battle at Tolosa, and Litorius soon died in Gothic imprisonment from his injuries. Avitus went – according to the orders of Aëtius – to Tolosa and offered a peace treaty which Theodoric accepted. Perhaps the Romans recognized at that time the sovereignty of the Visigoth state.

== Conflict with Vandals ==
A daughter of Theodoric had been married (in 429?) to Huneric, a son of the Vandal ruler Geiseric, but Huneric later had ambitions to wed Eudocia, a daughter of the Emperor Valentinian III. He therefore accused Theodoric's daughter of planning to kill him, and in 444 had her mutilated—her ears and nose cut off—and sent back to her father, which earned the enmity of the Visigoths.

In 444, the former magister militum Sebastianus, son-in-law of Bonifatius, fled to Tolosa seeking refuge after exhausting his welcome in Constantinople, where he had been living in exile since Bonifatius's death. This could have strained relations with Aëtius, but Theodoric did not permit Sebastianus to stay in Toulouse. Sebastianus then fled to Barcelona, where he was also rebuffed, before finally seeking asylum in Africa. Unfortunately for Sebastianus, Geiseric seems to have been no happier to welcome Sebastianus than Theodoric, and had Sebastianus executed shortly after his arrival.

Theodoric was also an enemy of the Suevic king Rechila in Iberia, because Visigoth troops assisted the imperial commander Vitus in his campaign against the Suevi in 446. But the ability of this people to conduct a strong defence and the better relations between Geiseric and the Roman Empire led Theodoric to change his foreign policy. He therefore, in February 449, married one of his daughters to the new Suevic king Rechiar, who visited his father-in-law at Tolosa in July 449. On his return, according to the author Isidore of Seville, Rechiar, with the assistance of Visigoth troops, devastated the area surrounding the city of Caesaraugusta and managed by guile to take Ilerda.

Some recent scholars doubt that Theodoric issued legislation, as it was assumed in earlier times.

== Alliance against the Huns ==
When Attila the Hun finally invaded Gaul, Avitus arranged an alliance between Theodoric and his long-standing enemy Aëtius against the Huns. Theodoric joined this coalition because he recognized the danger of the Huns to his own realm. With his whole army and his sons, Thorismund and Theodoric, he joined Aëtius.

The Visigoth and Roman troops then saved the civitas Aurelianorum and forced Attila to withdraw (June 451).

== Battle of the Catalaunian Plains ==
Aëtius and Theodoric followed the Huns and fought against them at the Battle of the Catalaunian Plains near Troyes in or about June 451. Most Visigoths fought at the right wing under the command of Theodoric but a smaller force fought at the left under the command of Thorismund.

Theodoric's forces contributed decisively to the victory of the Romans, but he himself was killed during the battle. Jordanes records two different accounts of his death: one was that Theodoric was thrown from his horse and trampled to death; the second was that Theodoric was slain by the spear of the Ostrogoth Andag, who was the father of Jordanes's patron Gunthigis.

The body of Theodoric was not found until the next day. According to Gothic tradition he was mourned and buried by his warriors on the battlefield. Immediately, Thorismund was elected as successor of his father.

== Power struggles among his sons ==
After Theodoric I's death, his sons ruled the Visigoths in succession, murdering one another by turns. Thorismund ruled from Theodoric's death until 453, when he was murdered by his brother Theodoric II. Theodoric II ruled from 453 until 466, when he was murdered by his younger brother Euric. Another brother, Frederic, had died in battle during Theodoric II's reign. Euric ruled the Visigoths from 466 until his death by natural causes in 484. Theodoric's two other sons, Retimer and Himnerith, did not serve as Visigothic kings; after Euric's death, power passed to his son, Alaric II.

According to Sidonius Apollinaris (who spent time at Theodoric II's court), Theodoric II was a grandson of Alaric I, the first King of the Visigoths. This is consistent with Theodoric II's son being called Alaric II, as this would make him the great-grandson of Alaric I. The general consensus is that Theodoric I's wife must have been a daughter of Alaric, as there are no contemporary accounts claiming that Theodoric himself was Alaric's son.

== Legacy ==
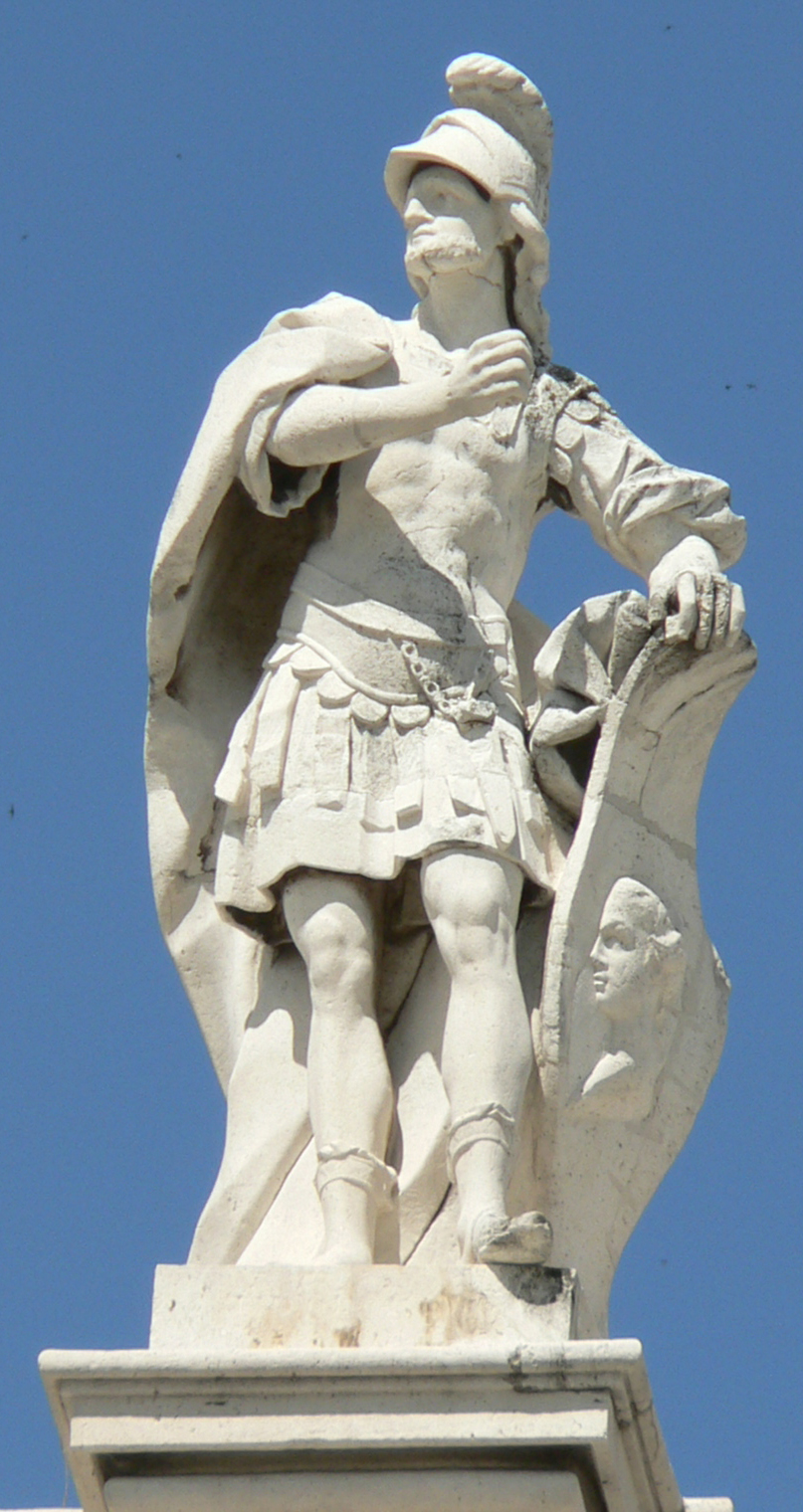
Statue of Theodoric I in the Royal Palace of Madrid, Spain

For his sacrifice and subsequent victory over Attila at the Battle of the Catalaunian Plains, Theodoric became a revered figure in Western historiography, and served as an inspiration for J. R. R. Tolkien in his creation of king Théoden of Rohan in The Lord of the Rings and The Battle of the Pelennor Fields.

== Portrayals ==
He is played by Liam Cunningham in the 2001 miniseries Attila.

== Notes ==
King Theodoric I of the Visigoths Balti dynasty Died: 451
Regnal titles
Preceded by Wallia	King of the Visigoths; 418–451	Succeeded by Thorismund
