= Probus (son of Magnus) =

Probus (born c. 420, 430 or 435), a Roman Senator and a v. nob. (vir nobilis) of Narbonne, then Narbo, was a man of literary taste and precocious ability. His father was Magnus, Consul of Rome in 460. He was a friend of Sidonius Apollinaris from their schooldays.

He married before 450 Eulalia (?), born c. 425, a cousin of Sidonius Apollinaris, daughter of Thaumastus. They were perhaps the parents of:

- Industria of Narbonne, then Narbo, born c. 450 or 465, married before 475 to Tonantius Ferreolus
- Firminus (455 or 460 – c. 503), v. inl. at Arles, then Arelate, and a propinq. of Magnus Felix Ennodius
- Probatius (certain son), Bishop of Uzès in 506
