= Viventius =

Roman official and administrator

Viventius (fl. 364 - 371) was a Roman official and administrator during the reign of Valentinian I.

A native of Siscia, in Pannonia, Viventius is first attested as holding the position of Quaestor sacri palatii in 364, one of a number of Pannonians who benefitted from the rise of their compatriots Valens and Valentinian I to the imperial throne. As Quaestor, Viventius assisted in the conducting of magic trials at Rome and was the next year appointed Praefectus urbi. It was during his tenure that a disputed papal election to choose the successor of Pope Liberius led to an outbreak of great violence, during which a battle between the rival factions of Damasus and Ursicinus led to the deaths of one hundred and thirty seven people in a single day. Following on from his urban prefecture, Viventius assumed the office of Praetorian Prefect of Gaul, one of the most senior administrative posts in the Roman Empire, and which he held from 368 to 371. His date of death is unknown, however, it was prior to 384 when he is referred to as "of illustrious memory". He is described by Ammianus Marcellinus as "a just and prudent man".
