= Rufus (consul 457) =

Flavius Rufus (floruit 457 AD) was a politician of the Eastern Roman Empire. In 457 he was appointed consul with Constantinus as colleague; both of them were recognised only in the East.

Nothing else is known about him.

== Sources ==
- Martindale, John R., ed. (1980). "Fl. Rufus 4". The Prosopography of the Later Roman Empire: Volume II, AD 395–527. Cambridge: Cambridge University Press. p. 959. ISBN 0-521-20159-4.

Preceded by Eparchius Avitus Augustus (alone in the West), Iohannes (East), Varanes (East)	Consul of the Roman Empire; 457 with Flavius Constantinus	Succeeded by Iulius Maiorianus Augustus, Flavius Valerius Leo Augustus
