= Agilulf (bishop of Metz) =

Agilulf, also called Aigulf (c. 537 – 601), was a Bishop of Metz between 590 or 591 and 601, and was the predecessor of Arnual or Arnoldus or Arnoald (601–609 or 611). He was a son of Ferreolus, Senator of Narbonne, and wife Dode, Abbess of Saint Pierre de Reims.
