= Arcadius of Bourges =

Saint Arcadius of Bourges
- Died: 549
- Venerated in: Roman Catholic Church
- Major shrine: relics are at Saint Ursin
- Feast: August 1

Saint Arcadius (died 549 AD) was a bishop of Bourges. He took part in the Third Council of Orléans (538). He was bishop for about 15 years. His episcopate is sometimes said to have lasted from 531 to 541.
