= Sigrid Mratschek =

German historian of ancient history

- Born: 15 May 1955 (age 71); Ludwigshafen am Rhein, Rhineland-Palatinate, West Germany
- Education: University of Heidelberg
- Occupation: Ancient Historian
- Years active: 1975 - present

Sigrid Hella Mratschek (also known under Sigrid Mratschek-Halfmann, born 15 May 1955) is a German ancient historian.

== Career ==
Sigrid Mratschek studied Classics and History at the University of Heidelberg from 1975 to 1981. In 1981, she passed the first state examination for the teaching profession at grammar schools. From 1977 to 1984 she was a research assistant to Michael von Albrecht and Géza Alföldy.

From 1982 to 1985 she received a doctoral scholarship from the Konrad Adenauer Foundation, and from 1986 to 1989 she worked as a research assistant at the University of Osnabrück on publication of Upper German inscriptions for the supplement to the Corpus Inscriptionum Latinarum XIII.

In 1990, she completed her doctorate in Ancient History at the University of Heidelberg with a minor in Classical Philology and Medieval and Modern History. In 1991, she was honoured for her dissertation Divites et praepotentes. Reichtum und soziale Stellung in der Literatur der Prinzipatszeit (The Rich and Powerful. Wealth and Social Status in the Literature of the Principate Period) with the Bruno Heck Science Prize.

From 1989 to 2000, Mratschek worked as a university assistant at the University of Frankfurt am Main. Her habilitation thesis on The Letters of Paulinus of Nola: Communication and Social Contacts Between Christian Intellectuals, was funded by the German Research Foundation (DFG). In 2001/02 she worked with Georg Schöllgen at the Institute for Church History at the University of Bonn in an interdisciplinary DFG project on bishops' legations to the imperial court. In 2002, she moved to the University of Rostock as a research assistant, where she was appointed adjunct professor in 2004 and received the academic status of professor of ancient history in 2008. From 2004 to 2008, she was a member of the Council of the Faculty of Philosophy.

In 2007, Mratschek was elected to the board of the International Patristic Society (Association Internationale d'Études Patristiques). In 2012, she was a visiting fellow at All Souls College, Oxford University, with a research project on Sidonius Apollinaris. In 2013, she was appointed to the editorial board of the Journal of Late Antiquity as Consulting Editor.

Mratschek retired in March 2020. She gave a farewell lecture in 2021, which focused on the silence of the muses in Sidonius Apollinaris.

== Select works ==
- 'Divites et praepotentes: Wealth and Social Status in the Literature of the Principate Period' (Historia. Einzelschriften, Band 70), Franz-Steiner-Verlag, Stuttgart 1993, ISBN 3-515-05973-3.
- ‘Multis enim notissima est sanctitas loci: Paulinus and the Gradual Rise of Nola as a Centre of Christian Hospitality’, Journal of Early Christian Studies, 9(4) (2001) 511-53.
- Der Briefwechsel des Paulinus von Nola. Kommunikation und soziale Kontakte zwischen christlichen Intellektuellen (Hypomnemata, Band 134). Vandenhoeck und Ruprecht, Göttingen 2002, ISBN 3-525-25232-3.
