= Claudius Postumus Dardanus =

5th century praetorian prefect

Claudius Postumus Dardanus was a praetorian prefect of Gaul from the early fifth century AD, who was against Jovinus, considered as a usurper of imperial authority. After he had been defeated in Valencia (Valence, Drôme) by King of the Goths Ataulf Dardanus had him executed with his brother and co-emperor Sebastianus, sending both of their heads afterwards to Honorius. They were mounted on the walls of Ravenna (before being passed on to Carthage, where they were put on permanent display with the heads of four other usurpers).

In all likelihood, Dardanus came from a modest background and due to his studies and abilities reached the status of a patrician (an honorary position in the Lower Empire related to the acquisition of effective status as a senator), and access to the post of prefect of the Gauls twice, probably the first time in 401-404 or 406-407 and 412–413 in a second time after the transfer in 407 of the seat of praetorian prefecture of Gaul from Augusta Treverorum (Trier) to Arelate (Arles).

Dardanus was converted to Christianity and then retired to the Alps with his wife Nevia Galla, where he began a correspondence with Jerome and Augustine of Hippo. An admirer of St. Augustine, with whom he had established a correspondence, he founded an institution called Theopolis (Greek: "City of God"). This institution was established in his domain, for which he expanded on both sides of the road leading from Sisteron to the present village of Saint-Geniez to which it gives the walls and doors. No archaeological remains of this city exist, only a Latin inscription carved in the rock face along the road.
