= Theodoric II =

King of the Visigoths from 453 to 466

King of the Visigoths
- Reign: 453 – early 466
- Predecessor: Thorismund
- Successor: Euric
- Born: c. 422
- Died: early 466 (aged c. 44)
- Father: Theodoric I
- Religion: Arian Christianity

Theodoric II (c. 422 – early 466) was king of the Aquitanian Goths between 453 and 466. From his reign, it is known that he was a faithful ally of the Romans in the beginning. His Gothic warriors frequently took action as auxiliary forces of the Roman army, especially with the Roman emperor Avitus, with whom he was on good terms. However after the death of Avitus in 456, his attitude changed and he behaved more and more independently.

== Supporter of Emperor Avitus ==
Theodoric succeeded his brother Thorismund in 453 after a brief reign that is unknown. It is only known that Theodoric had killed his brother.

At the beginning of his regime, Valentinian III was still emperor of the Western Roman Empire with his father's longtime enemy Flavius Aetius still at the reins of power. However, after Aetius's murder on 21 September 454 and Valentinian's assassination on 16 March 455, his passive attitude would not last for long. Not long after the rise of Petronius Maximus to the throne did disaster strike for the Empire, as on the 22 of May the Vandals invaded Rome after a plea was sent by empress Licinia Eudoxia to end the reign of Petronius Maximus. They robbed the city and the emperor was killed by an angry mob. At that time Avitus, a Roman senator of Gallic descent, was on a diplomatic mission at the court of Theodoric II in Toulouse. Theodoric, who knew Avitus as a mentor in his youth and had a very good relation with him, urged Avitus to demand the imperial crown for himself, which happened before the Gallo-Roman senators. After that Theoderic supported his friend with a large contingent of his warriors.

=== Campaign in Spain ===
In 456 came the Gothic army for Emperor Avitus in action in Spain to restore Roman power. Theodoric attacked Rechiar, the king of the Suebi, to punish him for raids in the nearby Roman territory. Theodoric defeated him in the Battle of Órbigo (456) on the river Órbigo, near the city of Astorga in a battle where Rechiar was wounded but escaped the field, only to be hunted down & killed by Theodoric's troops. He then conquered Bracara Augusta (Braga), the capital of the Suebi. According to the tradition, things got rough and the Gothic army plundered several cities in Gallaecia, the Roman province in which the Suebi had established their kingdom. Some of the Suebi were massacred and even sacred places were attacked, probably because of the support of the local clergy for the Suevens. After this, Theodoric's army controlled the Spanish provinces Hispania Baetica, most of Hispania Tarraconensis and southern Lusitania.

=== Deposition of Avitus ===
In the course of 456, Avitus got into trouble in Italy. The emperor was massively unpopular with the Italian aristocracy and the army due to his Gallic descent and the fact that he was declared emperor by barbarians (the Visigoths). To many in Italy, he was a puppet of Theodoric; and so, when conflict erupted between the emperor and his two generals Ricimer and Majorian, he had to fight alone without the Gothic support of Theodoric, who was still on campaign in Spain. The Roman army in Italy revolted in the late Summer of 456. Avitus fled to Arelate, where he gathered some troops, and returned to battle the rebel generals, but was badly defeated by Ricimer and Majorian in a battle near the city of Piacenza. Avitus fled again but was later captured and deposed as emperor. A period of interregnum from October 456 to April 457 followed until he was ultimately succeeded by Majorian. From the moment the King was informed of Avitus's fall, Theodoric's attitude toward the Empire changed. Secretly he started to counter Roman authority. In Spain he left soldier colonies, supposedly for the maintenance of peace, but in reality it was an occupation force.

== Opponent of the Roman Empire ==
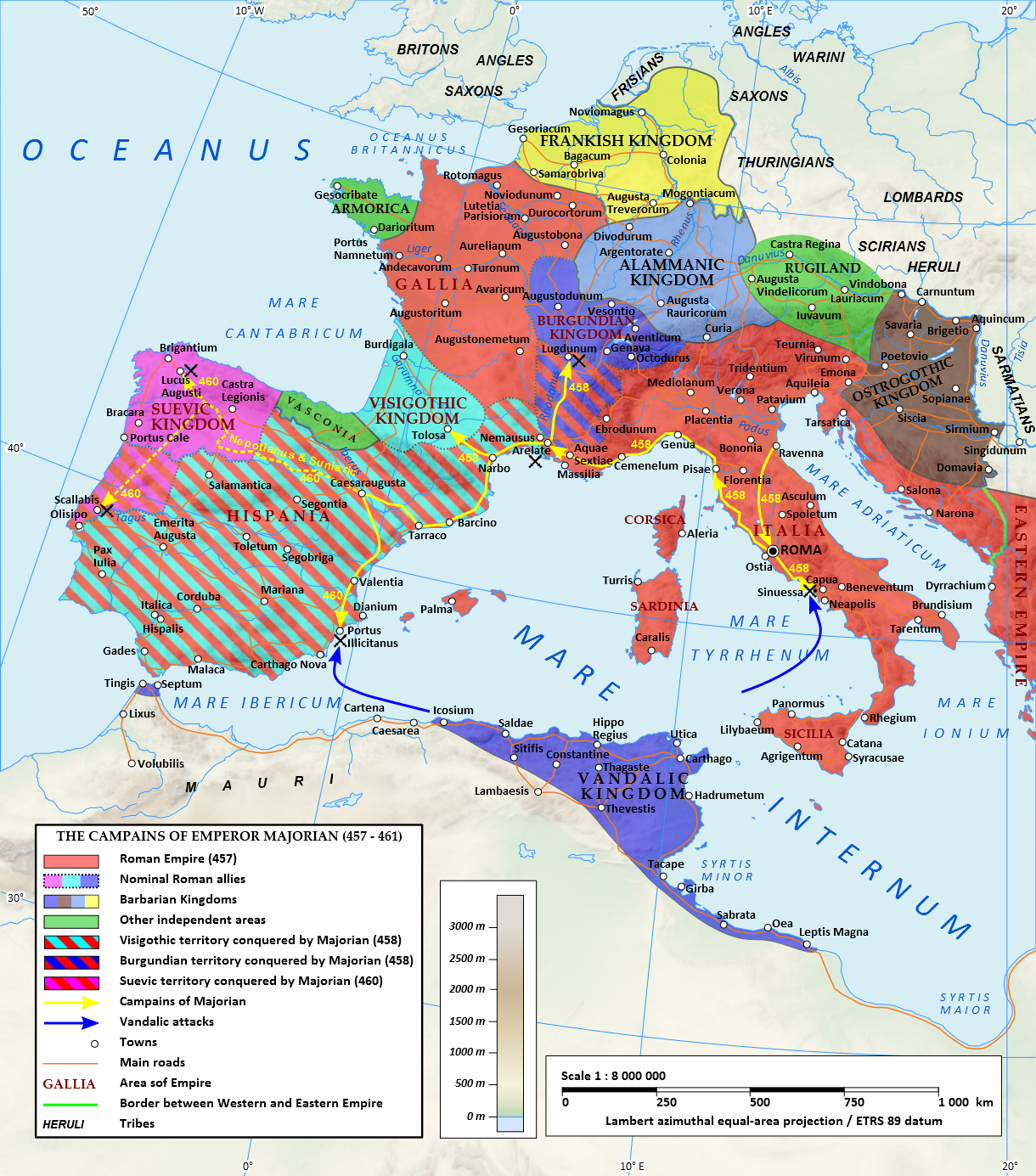
Expansion of the Visigothic sphere of influence under Theoderic II (457–461)

=== Battle of Arles ===
The new emperor Majorian saw the rising power of the Goths in Spain and Gaul as a major threat. With the Roman army's training and accompanied by the generals Aegidius and Nepotianus, Majorian marched against the Gothic king and his army, who were stationed at Arelate (Arles), at the mouth of the Rhodanus (Rhône) River. The resulting battle was a crushing Gothic defeat. The Goths fled, and King Theodoric narrowly escaped death. In the ensuing peace negotiations, the Goths abandoned their settlements in Spain and returned to Aquitaine, their original territory.

Subsequently, in 460, Majorian launched a campaign against the Vandals, in which the Aquitanian Goths were forced to participate. In spite of that the Romans suffered a heavy loss at the Battle of Cartagena, the Roman fleet became completely destroyed by the Vandals. Emperor Majorian was eliminated, and "magister militum" Ricimer, part Gothic, now attempted to seize all power. In Gaul, General Aegidius, an opponent of Ricimer, refused to accept this situation and rebelled.

=== Territorial Expansion to the South and North ===
The fall of Majorian in 461 and the resulting power struggle between Aegidius and Ricimer gave Theodoric the opportunity to realize his plans for greater power within the Western Roman Empire. In Gaul, Aegidius prepared to invade Italy, and Ricimer sought support from the Burgundians and Aquitanian Goths to counter this threat. In exchange for Roman territory, Theodoric provided military support to Ricimer and sent him troops. The Romans ceded the port city of Narbonne and its surroundings. Theodoric thus gained a new sphere of influence in the Mediterranean and hoped for further territorial expansion to the north once Aegidius's Roman army was routed. With the help of the Burgundians and Goths, Aegidius's access to Italy was blocked, but Ricimer's alliance failed to defeat him. Aegidius withdrew north of the Loire River, and the area south of it was taken by Theoderic.

== War with Aegidius and death ==
Theoderic made plans to extend his power to northern Gaul where Aegidius, cut off from the rest of the Roman Empire, stayed with his army north of the Loire and south of the Somme. In 463, Theoderic ordered his younger brother Frederic to invade Aegidius's territory. Frederick encountered fierce resistance from the Romans, who had strengthened themselves with the help of the Franks. In the Battle of Orleans, Frederick was killed, and the Goths were defeated, which Kulikowski writes "would have important consequences for the Gothic succession." Theodoric was himself murdered in 466 by his younger brother Euric, who succeeded him to the throne.

== Described by a Roman ==
The Gallo-Roman Sidonius Apollinaris wrote a famously vivid and gushing letter to his brother-in-law Agricola describing the king and his court:

You have often begged a description of Theodoric the Gothic king, whose gentle breeding fame commends to every nation; you want him in his quantity and quality, in his person, and the manner of his existence. I gladly accede, as far as the limits of my page allow, and highly approve so fine and ingenuous a curiosity.

Well, he is a man worth knowing, even by those who cannot enjoy his close acquaintance, so happily have Providence and Nature joined to endow him with the perfect gifts of fortune; his way of life is such that not even the envy which lies in wait for kings can rob him of his proper praise. And first as to his person. He is well set up, in height above the average man, but below the giant. His head is round, with curled hair retreating somewhat from brow to crown. His nervous neck is free from disfiguring knots. The eyebrows are bushy and arched; when the lids droop, the lashes reach almost half-way down the cheeks. The upper ears are buried under overlying locks, after the fashion of his race. The nose is finely aquiline; the lips are thin and not enlarged by undue distension of the mouth. Every day the hair springing from his nostrils is cut back; that on the face springs thick from the hollow of the temples, but the razor has not yet come upon his cheek, and his barber is assiduous in eradicating the rich growth on the lower part of the face. Chin, throat, and neck are full, but not fat, and all of fair complexion; seen close, their colour is fresh as that of youth; they often flush, but from modesty, and not from anger. His shoulders are smooth, the upper- and forearms strong and hard; hands broad, breast prominent; waist receding. The spine dividing the broad expanse of back does not project, and you can see the springing of the ribs; the sides swell with salient muscle, the well-girt flanks are full of vigour. His thighs are like hard horn; the knee-joints firm and masculine; the knees themselves the comeliest and least wrinkled in the world. A full ankle supports the leg, and the foot is small to bear such mighty limbs.

Now for the routine of his public life. Before daybreak he goes with a very small suite to attend the service of his priests. He prays with assiduity, but, if I may speak in confidence, one may suspect more of habit than conviction in this piety. Administrative duties of the kingdom take up the rest of the morning. Armed nobles stand about the royal seat; the mass of guards in their garb of skins are admitted that they may be within call, but kept at the threshold for quiet's sake; only a murmur of them comes in from their post at the doors, between the curtain and the outer barrier.1 And now the foreign envoys are introduced. The king hears them out, and says little; if a thing needs more discussion he puts it off, but accelerates matters ripe for dispatch. The second hour arrives; he rises from the throne to inspect his treasure-chamber or stable.

If the chase is the order of the day, he joins it, but never carries his bow at his side, considering this derogatory to royal state. When a bird or beast is marked for him, or happens to cross his path, he puts his hand behind his back and takes the bow from a page with the string all hanging loose; for as he deems it a boy's trick to bear it in a quiver, so he holds it effeminate to receive the weapon ready strung. When it is given him, he sometimes holds it in both hands and bends the extremities towards each other; at others he sets it, knot-end downward, against his lifted heel, and runs his finger up the slack and wavering string. After that, he takes his arrows, adjusts, and lets fly. He will ask you beforehand what you would like him to transfix; you choose, and he hits. If there is a miss through either's error, your vision will mostly be at fault, and not the archer's skill.

On ordinary days, his table resembles that of a private person. The board does not groan beneath a mass of dull and unpolished silver set on by panting servitors; the weight lies rather in the conversation than in the plate; there is either sensible talk or none. The hangings and draperies used on these occasions are sometimes of purple silk, sometimes only of linen; art, not costliness, commends the fare, as spotlessness rather than bulk the silver. Toasts are few, and you will oftener see a thirsty guest impatient, than a full one refusing cup or bowl. In short, you will find elegance of Greece, good cheer of Gaul, Italian nimbleness, the state of public banquets with the attentive service of a private table, and everywhere the discipline of a king's house. What need for me to describe the pomp of his feast days? No man is so unknown as not to know of them. But to my theme again. The siesta after dinner is always slight, and sometimes intermitted. When inclined for the board-game,1 he is quick to gather up the dice, examines them with care, shakes the box with expert hand, throws rapidly, humorously apostrophizes them, and patiently waits the issue. Silent at a good throw, he makes merry over a bad, annoyed by neither fortune, and always the philosopher. He is too proud to ask or to refuse a revenge; he disdains to avail himself of one if offered; and if it is opposed will quietly go on playing. You effect recovery of your men without obstruction on his side; he recovers his without collusion upon yours. You see the strategist when he moves the pieces; his one thought is victory. Yet at play he puts off a little of his kingly rigour, inciting all to good fellowship and the freedom of the game: I think he is afraid of being feared. Vexation in the man whom he beats delights him; he will never believe that his opponents have not let him win unless their annoyance proves him really victor. You would be surprised how often the pleasure born of these little happenings may favour the march of great affairs. Petitions that some wrecked influence had left derelict come unexpectedly to port; I myself am gladly beaten by him when I have a favour to ask, since the loss of my game may mean the gaining of my cause. About the ninth hour, the burden of government begins again. Back come the importunates, back the ushers to remove them; on all sides buzz the voices of petitioners, a sound which lasts till evening, and does not diminish till interrupted by the royal repast; even then they only disperse to attend their various patrons among the courtiers, and are astir till bedtime. Sometimes, though this is rare, supper is enlivened by sallies of mimes, but no guest is ever exposed to the wound of a biting tongue. Withal there is no noise of hydraulic organ,1 or choir with its conductor intoning a set piece; you will hear no players of lyre or flute, no master of the music, no girls with cithara or tabor; the king cares for no strains but those which no less charm the mind with virtue than the ear with melody. When he rises to withdraw, the treasury watch begins its vigil; armed sentries stand on guard during the first hours of slumber. But I am wandering from my subject. I never promised a whole chapter on the kingdom, but a few words about the king. I must stay my pen; you asked for nothing more than one or two facts about the person and the tastes of Theodoric; and my own aim was to write a letter, not a history. Farewell.

— Sidonius Apollinaris, Epistulae Book I, Letter 2

This description was later largely copied by the German chronicler Rahewin when describing Frederick Barbarossa in the 12th century.

King Theodoric II of the Visigoths Balti dynasty Died: 466
Regnal titles
Preceded by Thorismund	King of the Visigoths; 453–466	Succeeded by Euric
