= Thorismund =

King of the Visigoths (c. 420–453)

King of the Visigoths
- Reign: 20 June 451 – 453
- Predecessor: Theodoric I
- Successor: Theodoric II
- Born: c. 420
- Died: 453 (aged 33)
- Father: Theodoric I
- Religion: Arian Christianity

Thorismund (Gothic: 𐌸𐌰𐌿𐍂𐌹𐍃𐌼𐍉𐌸, also Thorismod or Thorismud, as manuscripts of the chief source confusingly attest) (c. 420–453), became king of the Visigoths after his father Theodoric I was killed in the Battle of the Catalaunian Plains (also called Battle of Châlons) in 451 AD. He was murdered in 453 and was succeeded by his brother Theodoric II.

== Biography ==
Thorismund appears to have played a pivotal role in the Battle of Châlons as he led a contingent of the Visigoth forces in capturing an important summit at the very early stages of the conflict. The summit seems to have extended to the whole of the left flank of the Ostrogoth and Hun forces. Thorismund descended from the hills during the late stages of the conflict, when the Huns had prevailed over the Alans, and the Ostrogoths were pushing the disorganized Visigoths after the death of their king Theodoric. Thorismund led his force of Visigoths in a decisive charge which, according to Edward Gibbon, flanked both the Ostrogoths and subsequently the Huns and snatched victory from his enemies.

King Thorismund of the Visigoths Balti dynasty Died: 453
Regnal titles
Preceded by Theodoric I	King of the Visigoths; 451–453	Succeeded by Theodoric II
