= Euric =

King of the Visigoths from 466 to 484

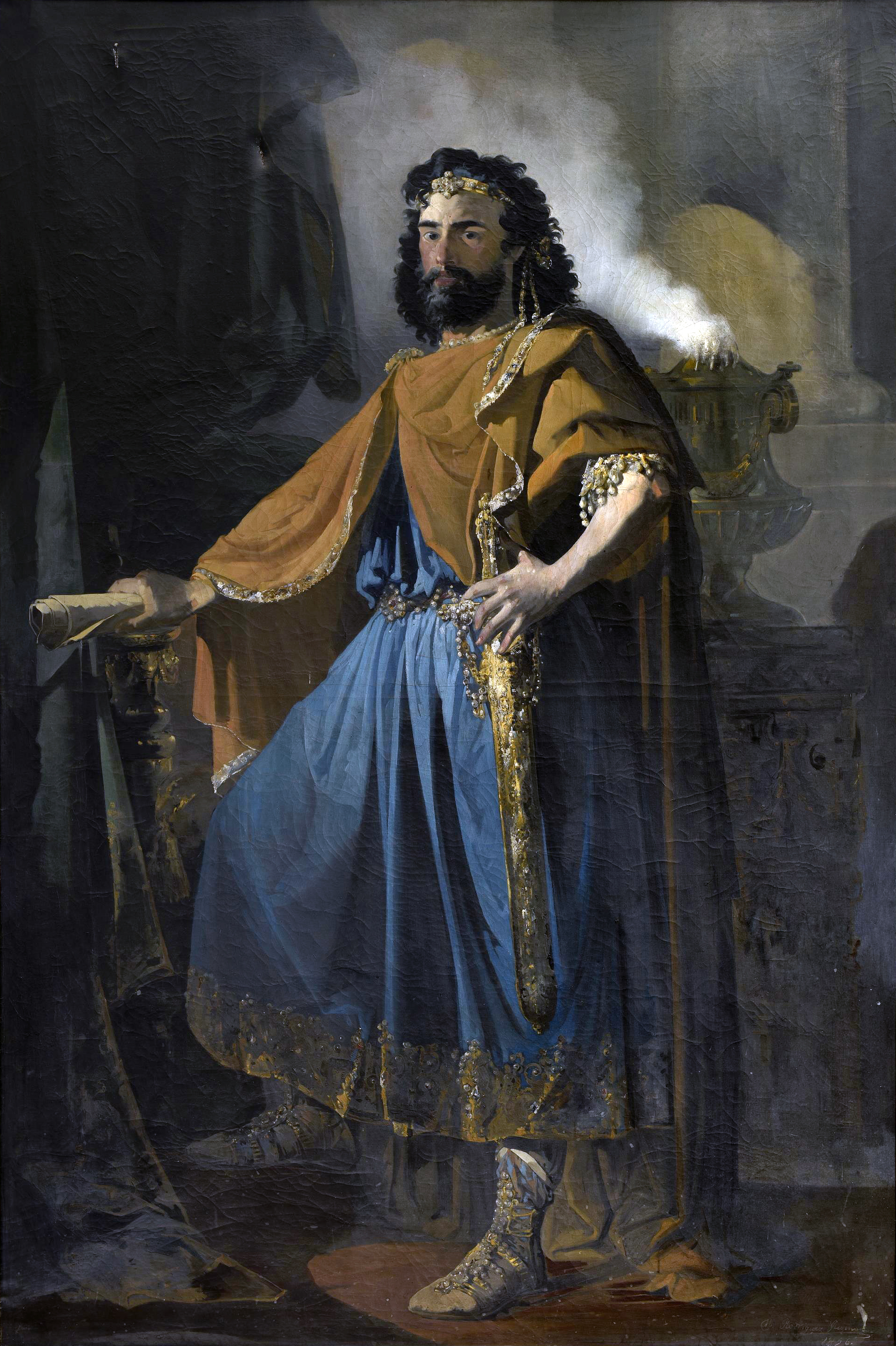
- Posthumous portrait of Euric painted in 1855

King of the Visigoths
- Reign: 466 – 28 December 484
- Predecessor: Theodoric II
- Successor: Alaric II
- Born: c. 426
- Died: 28 December 484 (aged 57–58)
- Spouse: Ragnagild
- Issue: Alaric II
- Dynasty: Balt
- Father: Theodoric I
- Religion: Arianism

Euric, also known as Evaric (c. 426 – 28 December 484), son of Theodoric I, ruled as king (rex) of the Visigoths, after murdering his brother, Theodoric II, from 466 until his death in 484. Sometimes he is called Euric II.

== Early years and kingship ==
Euric was born between 420 and 430 as the third son of King Theodoric I, who died in 451 in the Battle of the Catalaunian Fields against the Huns and Ostrogoths. His brothers Thorismund and Theodoric II were his predecessors as kings. Nothing is known about his youth. He likely grew up in the Gothic capital Toulouse and served in the Roman army, like his brother Frederic. Euric's appointment as king was typical of the Gothic succession for that time, where permanent succession was not common. Power was gained through violence and with the support of the aristocracy. Euric became king by murdering his older brother Theodoric in 466 in Toledo. This act was not motivated by his brother's Roman sympathies but rather by Euric's thirst for power. Sidonius Apollinaris described him as determined, intelligent, but also a tyrannical pursuer of Catholic bishops.

== Wars against the Romans ==
=== Uprising and independent from Rome ===
After his accession to the throne, Euric continued his brother's foreign policy, but he also tried to make an end of the alliance with the Western Roman Empire. The crisis that arose in 468 after the defeat of the joint Roman fleet in the war against the Vandals, was for Euric the starting point to declare himself independent monarch in Gaul. On behalf of Euric, the Gothic militias in Spain revolted. The cities of Merikda, Braga, Zaragona, Pamploma and Cluna were occupied or armed, seriously threatening the Roman rule in Spain.

Emperor Anthemius's attempt to form an anti-Gothic coalition was unsuccessful. Euric destroyed an imperial army in southern Gaul that went to war against him from Italy.

=== Battles in North and Central Gaul ===
The territory of the Visigoths around 475

Euric's attempt to take control over Northern Gaul failed due to the strong resistance of the Gallo-Romans and Franks led by Childeric I in 469. Like Theodoric II before him, he suffered a great loss near Orléans. After his defeat, Euric returned to the South. Thanks to the betrayal of Arvandus, the Gallic prefect, he was able to defeat an army sent by the British leader Riothamus to help the Romans. Another victory was achieved in the battle near Arles, which enabled him to conquer the area of Berry. As a result, Euric got a strong foothold in Provence. Only by strong resistance in Auvergne, the center of Gaul, could the Romans stand against him.

=== Wars in Spain and Italy ===
After reaching independence, Euric started a new war against the Romans. In 472 he conquered most of Hispania. Only the northeast, with the city of Barcelona as centrum remained in Roman hands. His attempt to extend his power to Italy failed due to diplomatic intervention by Emperor Glycerius in 473. Nevertheless, emperor Julius Nepos, the successor of Glycerius, who needed the support of the Goths, renounced Provence in 475, as well as the region around Barcelona to Euric.

== Separate from the Roman Empire ==
Previous Visigothic kings had officially ruled only as legates of the Roman emperor; Euric was the first to declare his complete independence from the puppet emperors. In 475 he forced the Western Emperor Julius Nepos to recognize his full independence instead of the status of foederati in exchange for the return of the Provence region of Gaul. The Roman citizens of Hispania then pledged their allegiance to Euric, recognizing him as their king. In the same year, Clermont(-Ferrand) surrendered to him after a long siege, and its bishop, Sidonius Apollinaris, sued for peace.

Euric was one of the more learned of the great Visigothic kings and was the first one to formally codify his people's laws. The Code of Euric, probably issued around 476, codified the traditional laws that had been entrusted to the memory of designated specialists, who had learned each article by heart. He employed many Gallo-Roman nobles in his court, such as Leo of Narbonne.

At Euric's death of natural causes in 484, the Kingdom of the Visigoths encompassed a third of modern France and almost all of Iberia (i.e. except the region of Galicia, then expanding until the Douro river basin in present-day Portugal and by then ruled by the Suebi).

The fortune of nations has often depended on accidents; and France may ascribe her greatness to the premature death of the Gothic king, at a time when his son by his wife Ragnachildis, Alaric II was a helpless infant [Alaric was at least 18 when his father Euric died], and his adversary Clovis an ambitious and valiant youth.

— Edward Gibbon, The History of the Decline and Fall of the Roman Empire

== Sources ==
- Frassetto, Michael, ed. (2003). "Euric (c.420-484)". Encyclopedia of Barbarian Europe: Society in Transformation. Bloomsbury Publishing.
- Wolfram, Door Herwig (1988). History of the Goths. Translated by Dunlap, Thomas J. University of California Press. ISBN 0-520-06983-8.

King Euric of the Visigoths Balti dynasty Born: 415 Died: 484
Regnal titles
Preceded by Theodoric II	King of the Visigoths; 466 – 28 December 484	Succeeded by Alaric II
