= Avitus =

Western Roman emperor from 455 to 456

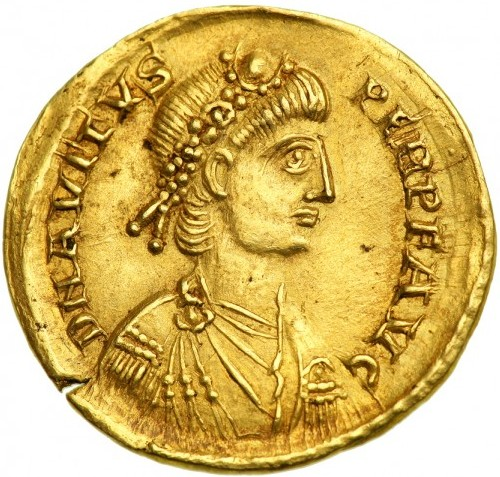
- Solidus of Avitus marked: d·n· avitus per· p·f· aug·

Roman emperor in the West
- Reign: 9 July 455 – 17 October 456
- Predecessor: Petronius Maximus
- Successor: Majorian
- Eastern emperor: Marcian
- Born: late 4th century Arvernis, Gaul
- Died: 456/7; Arvernis, Gaul
- Burial: Brivas
- Issue: Agricola; Ecdicius; Papianilla
Names
- Eparchius Avitus
- Father: Agricola (possibly)
- Religion: Chalcedonian Christianity

Eparchius Avitus (Note: This is the name given by the PLRE, RE, OCD and RIC, citing an inscription recorded in Rossi, Inscriptiones christianae Urbis Romae I, p. 344. Ersch & Gruber's Allgemeine Encyklopädie der Wissenschaften und Künste reports that "Marcus Maecilius" and "Flavius Maecilius" are found on Avitus's coins, while "Flavius Eparchius" appears in inscriptions (vol. Appellation – Arzilla, pp. 505–508, Winterhalder [1820]). RE (vol. II,2, col. 2395) notes that one such coin, bearing the inscription M. MAECIL. AVITHUS (sic), Eckhel, Doctrina Numorum Veterum viii. 193, was authenticated only by Banduri, and perhaps suspect. J. B. Bury in his History of the Later Roman Empire from the Death of Theodosius I to the Death of Justinian (1923) suggested "Marcus Maecilius Flavius Eparchius Avitus".) (died 456/7) was Roman emperor of the Western Empire from July 455 to October 456. He was a senator of Gallic extraction and a high-ranking officer both in the civil and military administration, as well as Bishop of Piacenza.

He opposed the reduction of the Western Roman Empire to Italy alone, both politically and from an administrative point of view. For this reason, as Emperor he introduced several Gallic senators in the Imperial administration; this policy, however, was opposed by the senatorial aristocracy and by the people of Rome, who had suffered from the sack of the city by the Vandals in 455.

Avitus had a good relationship with the Visigoths, in particular with their king Theodoric II, who was a friend of his and who acclaimed Avitus Emperor. The possibility of a strong and useful alliance between the Visigoths and Romans faded, however, when Theodoric invaded Hispania at Avitus's behest, which rendered him unable to help Avitus against the rebel Roman generals who deposed him.

== Origins and early career ==
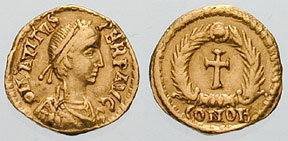
Tremissis of Emperor Avitus

Avitus was born in Avernia, now the town of Clermont-Ferrand within modern day France, into a family of the Gallo-Roman nobility. His father was possibly Agricola, Roman consul in 421.

Avitus had two sons, Agricola (fl. 455 – living 507, a vir illustris) and Ecdicius Avitus (later patricius and magister militum under Emperor Julius Nepos) and a daughter Papianilla; she married Sidonius Apollinaris, whose letters and panegyrics remain an important source for Avitus's life and times.

Avitus followed a course of study typical for a young man of his rank, including law. Before 421 he was sent to the powerful patricius Flavius Constantius (briefly Emperor in 421) to ask for a tax reduction for his own country; this embassy was successful. His relative Theodorus was held hostage at the court of the King of the Visigoths, Theodoric I. In 425–426, Avitus went and met him and the King, who let Avitus enter his own court. Here, around 439, Avitus met the son of Theodoric, Theodoric II, who later became King. Avitus inspired the young Theodoric to study Latin poets.

He then started a military career serving under the magister militum Aetius in his campaign in the Alps against the Juthungi and the Norics (430–431) and against the Burgundians (436). In 437, after being elevated to the rank of vir illustris, he returned to Avernia, where he held a high office, probably magister militum per Gallias. In the same year, he defeated a group of Hunnic raiders near Avernia and obliged Theodoric to lift the siege of Narbonne. In 439, he became Praetorian prefect of Gaul and renewed the friendship treaty with the Visigoths.

Before the summer of 440, he retired to private life at his estate, Avitacum, near Avernia. Here he lived until 451, when the Huns, led by Attila, invaded the Western Roman Empire; Avitus persuaded Theodoric into an alliance with Rome, and the combined forces of Theodoric and Aetius defeated Attila in the Battle of Châlons; Theodoric died in the battle.

== Rise to the throne ==
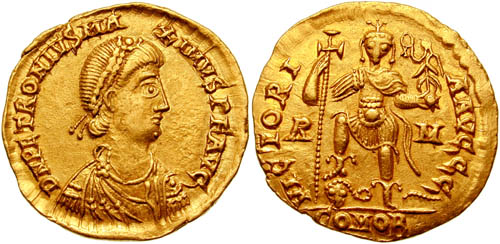
Petronius Maximus, who obtained the throne at the death of Valentinian III, recalled Avitus from his private life and sent him to ask for support to the Visigoths, but, at the death of Maximus, they acclaimed Avitus Emperor

In the late spring of 455, Avitus was recalled to service by emperor Petronius Maximus and was elevated to the rank of magister militum, probably praesentalis; Maximus sent Avitus in an embassy to the court of Theodoric II, who had succeeded his father, at Toulouse. This embassy probably confirmed the new king and his people as foederati of the Empire and asked for their support for the new Emperor.

While Avitus was at Theodoric's court, news came of the death of Petronius Maximus (31 May) and of the sack of Rome by the Vandals of Gaiseric. Theodoric acclaimed Avitus Emperor in Toulouse; on 9 July, the new Emperor was acclaimed by the Gallic chiefs gathered in Viernum, near Arelate (Arles), and later, around 5 August, before Avitus reached Rome, he received the recognition of the Roman Senate.

Avitus stayed in Gaul for three months, to consolidate his power in the region that was the center of his support, and later went to Italy with a Gallic army, probably reinforced with a Gothic force. He probably travelled to Noricum to restore the imperial authority in that province, and then passed through Ravenna, where he left a Gothic force under the new patricius and magister militum Remistus, a Visigoth. On 21 September, finally, he entered Rome.

== Consolidation of power ==
The effective power of Avitus depended on the support of all the major players in the Western Roman Empire in the mid-5th century. The new Emperor needed the support of both the civil institutions, the Roman Senate and the Eastern Roman Emperor Marcian, as well as that of the army and its commanders (the generals Majorian and Ricimer) and the Vandals of Gaiseric.

On 1 January 456, Avitus took the consulate, as was traditional in an Emperor's first year of power. However, his consulate sine collega (without a colleague) was not acknowledged by the Eastern court, which nominated two consuls of its own, Iohannes and Varanes. Avitus had communicated with the Eastern Emperor in a spirit of cooperation, but these dueling consular nominations showed that the relationship between the two courts was strained nonetheless.

== Foreign policy ==
Treaties under Marcian and a treaty of 442 between emperor Valentinian III and the Vandal king Gaiseric had failed to reduce Vandal incursions and raids along the Italian coast. Avitus's own efforts secured a temporary winter truce with them; but in March 456, Vandals destroyed Capua. Avitus sent Ricimer to defend Sicily, and the Romans defeated the Vandals twice, once in a land battle near Agrigento and another in a naval battle off Corsica.

During the reign of Avitus, the Visigoths expanded into Hispania, nominally under Roman authorisation but actually to promote their own interests. In 455, Avitus had sent an ambassador, comes Fronto, to the Suebi and then to Theodoric II to ask them to formally recognise Roman rule. When the Suebi invaded the Roman province of Hispania Tarraconensis, the Visigoths attacked and defeated them 5 October 456 at the Campus Paramus, twelve miles from Astorga, on the banks of the Órbigo (Urbicus), subsequently occupying the province as nominal foederati of the Empire.

== Fall ==
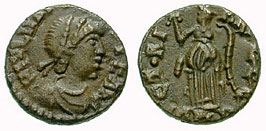
Majorian, comes domesticorum of Avitus, and Ricimer, a general of barbaric descent, rebelled against their Emperor, defeated him near Piacenza, and obliged him to become Bishop of the city. It was Majorian who succeeded Avitus on the throne.

In the meantime, resentment amongst the population of Italy against the "foreigner" Avitus grew. The population of Rome, devastated by the sack of Rome, suffered from food shortages due to the Vandal control of the naval routes, aggravated by the requirements of the foreign troops that had arrived with Avitus. The imperial treasury was almost empty and, after disbanding his Visigoth guard because of popular pressure, Avitus was obliged to pay their huge wages by melting down and selling the bronze of some statues.

Counting on the popular discontent, on the disbandment of the imperial guard, and on the prestige gained through their victories, Ricimer and the comes domesticorum Majorian rebelled against Avitus; the Emperor was obliged to leave Rome in early autumn and to move north. Ricimer had the Roman Senate depose Avitus and ordered the murder of the magister militum Remistus in the Palatium at Classe, on 17 September 456.

Avitus decided to react. First he chose Messianus, one of his collaborators in his embassy to the Visigoths ordered by Petronius Maximus, as the new magister militum; then he probably went to Gaul (Hydatius says to Arelate) to collect all the available forces, probably the Visigoth guard he had just disbanded; finally he led his forces against the troops of Ricimer, near Piacenza. The Emperor and his army entered the city and attacked the huge army led by Ricimer, but after a great massacre of his men, including Messianus, Avitus fled on 17 or 18 October 456. In the immediate aftermath Ricimer spared his life, but forced him to become Bishop of Piacenza.

== Death ==
Avitus's Gallic supporters may still have recognised him as emperor, despite his deposition. Sidonius Apollinaris tells of a failed coup d'état in Gaul organised by one Marcellus and probably aimed at bringing Avitus back to the throne. The contemporary historian Hydatius, who lived in Spain, considered the year 457 the third of Avitus's reign; Avitus's own intentions are not known, nor are the manner and date of his death, of which there are several versions. In some, he was told that the Roman Senate had condemned him to death, and so he tried to flee to Gaul, officially travelling there to bring donations to the basilica of Saint Julian in Avernia, his homeland; according to Gregory of Tours, he died during this journey. Other sources have him strangled or starved to death, by order of his successor. Avitus died in 457, or late in 456, very soon after his deposition, and was buried at Brioude, next to Saint Julian's tomb.

== Bibliography ==
=== Primary sources ===
Major source for Avitus's life until his rise to the throne is the panegyric written in occasion of his consulate by Sidonius Apollinaris (431–486):

- Sidonius Apollinaris, Panegyric for Avitus

For the history of his reign, the major sources are the Spaniard historian Hydatius (400 c. – 469 c.) and the Byzantine chronicler John of Antioch (first half of the 7th century):

- Hydatius, Chronicle
- John of Antioch, Chronicle

=== Secondary sources ===
- Jones, Arnold Hugh Martin, John Robert Martindale, John Morris, "Eparchius Avitus 5", Prosopography of the Later Roman Empire, Volume 2, Cambridge University Press, 1992, ISBN 0-521-20159-4, pp. 196–198.
- Mathisen, Ralph W., "Avitus (9/10 July 455 – 17/18 October 456)", De Imperatoribus Romanis
- Max, Gerald E., Political Intrigue During the Reigns of the Western Roman Emperors Avitus and Majorian, Historia, 1979, pp. 225–237.
- Randers-Pehrson, Justine Davis. "Barbarians and Romans: The Birth Struggle of Europe, A.D. 400–700". Norman University of Oklahoma Press, 1983. p. 251.
- Massimo Gusso (2021). "Sidonio Apollinare e il 'senato in esilio': intorno a una metafora poetica 'repubblicana'". Lexis. Lexis Num. 39 (n.s.) – Fasc. 1, pp. 154–192. doi:10.30687/Lexis/2724-1564/2021/01. S2CID 243244394.
- Mathisen, Ralph W. (1981). "Avitus, Italy and the East in AD 455–456". Byzantion. 51 (1). Brussels: 232–247. ISSN 0378-2506. JSTOR 44170681.

Regnal titles
Preceded by Petronius Maximus	Western Roman emperor 455–456	Succeeded by Majorian
Political offices
Preceded by Valentinian Augustus; Procopius Anthemius	Roman consul 456 with Iohannes and Varanes	Succeeded by Constantinus; Rufus
