= Sidonius Apollinaris =

5th-century Gallic poet, diplomat, bishop, and Catholic saint

Saint Sidonius Apollinaris
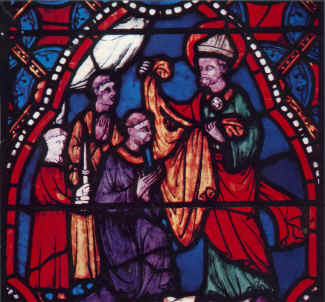
- Born: c. 430; Lugdunum, Gaul, Western Roman Empire
- Died: c. 485; Augustonemetum, Kingdom of the Visigoths
- Venerated in: Eastern Orthodox Church; Roman Catholic Church
- Feast: 21 August
- Major works: Carmina; Epistles

Gaius Sollius Modestus Apollinaris Sidonius, better known as Sidonius Apollinaris (5 November, c. 430 – 481/490 AD), was a poet, diplomat, and bishop. Born into the Gallo-Roman aristocracy, he was son-in-law of Emperor Avitus and was appointed Urban prefect of Rome by Emperor Anthemius in 468. In 469 he was appointed Bishop of Clermont and he led the defence of the city against attacks from the armies of Euric, King of the Visigoths, from 473 to 475. He regained his position as bishop, after the city's conquest, and retained it until his death in the 480s. He is venerated as a saint in the Catholic church, the Orthodox Church, and the True Orthodox Church, with his feast day on 21 August.

Sidonius wrote significant poetry, including panegyrics on different emperors, for which he was honored in his time: with a bronze statue in the libraries of Trajan's Forum, as comes, and by being made Patrician and Senator. A large number of his letters also survive, making him "the single most important surviving author from 5th-century Gaul" according to Eric Goldberg. He is one of four Gallo-Roman aristocrats of the 5th- to 6th-century whose correspondence survives in quantity; the others are Ruricius, bishop of Limoges (died 507); Alcimus Ecdicius Avitus, bishop of Vienne (died 518); and Magnus Felix Ennodius of Arles, bishop of Ticinum (died 534). All of them were linked in the tightly bound aristocratic Gallo-Roman network that provided the bishops of Catholic Gaul at the time. His writing is characterised by an extremely dense network of classical and biblical allusions, which was central to his self-presentation as a Roman aristocrat in a Western Roman Empire in decline.

== Life ==
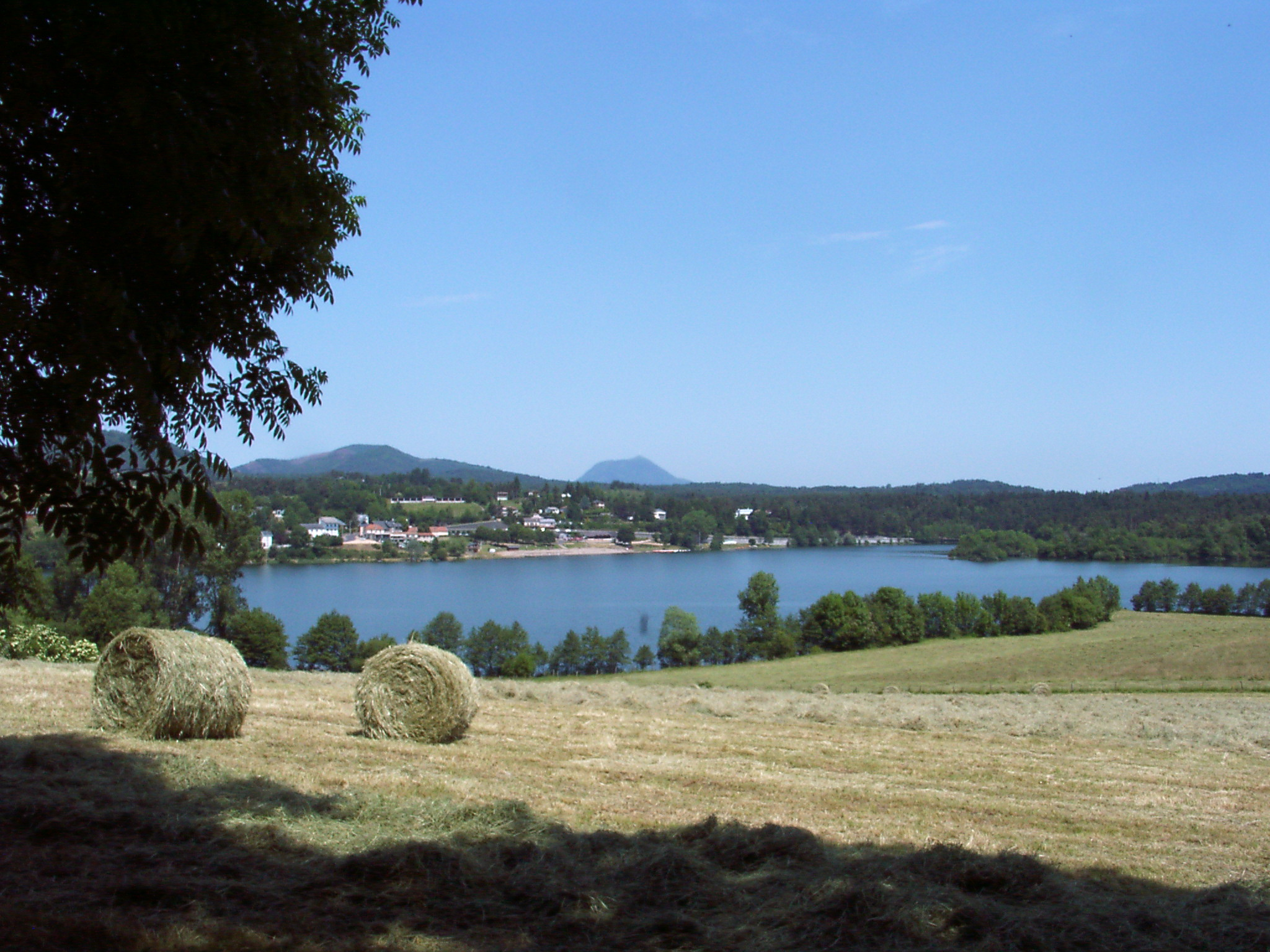
Lac d'Aydat, site of Sidonius's villa, Avitacum

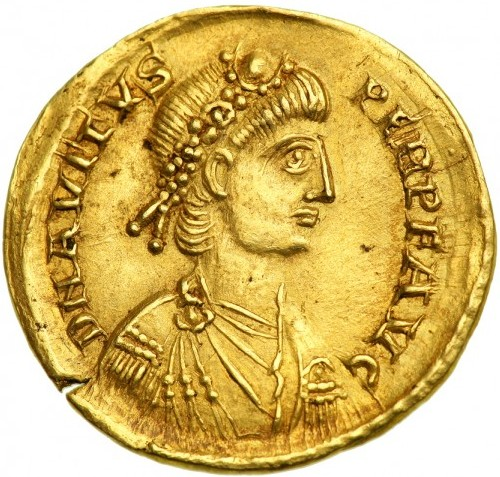
Solidus depicting Avitus (r. 455), father-in-law of Sidonius.

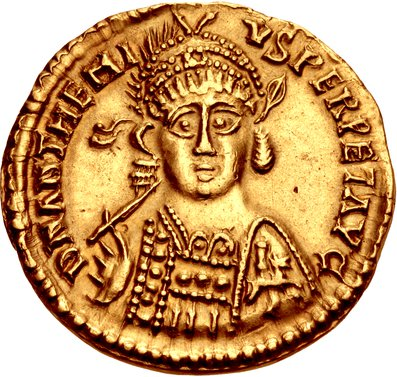
Solidus depicting Anthemius (r. 467-472).

Sidonius was born in Lugdunum (modern Lyon). His father, whose name is unknown, was Prefect of Gaul under Valentinian III. (Sidonius recalls with pride being present with his father at the installation of Astyrius as consul for the year 449.) Sidonius's grandfather, Apollinaris, was Praetorian Prefect of Gaul from May 408 or earlier until 409, when he was succeeded by his friend Decimus Rusticus. Sidonius may be a descendant of another Apollinaris who was Prefect of Gaul under Constantine II between 337 and 340.

Sidonius married Papianilla, the daughter of Emperor Avitus, around 452. This union produced one son, Apollinaris, and at least two daughters, Severina and Roscia, whom Sidonius mentions in his letters. A daughter Alcima is mentioned much later by Gregory of Tours, and Theodor Mommsen speculated that Alcima may be another name for one of his daughters. As part of Papianilla's dowry, Sidonius received a summer villa on Lac d'Aydat, named Avitacum. He describes the villa in detail in his letters, as an L-shaped villa with three baths, located on a hill overlooking the lake, but the description draws heavily on Pliny the Younger's depiction of his own villas and is carefully crafted to present his cultural identity.

=== Gallo-Roman aristocrat ===
Sidonius's letters reveal him to have been part of a wide-reaching network of Roman aristocrats in Gaul. His correspondence focused on his own region of Auvergne, where his main interlocutors were based in Clairmont (like him) and the provincial capital of Lyon. Other key contacts were the aristocrats of Narbonne and Bordeaux, but some of his letters are addressed as far afield as Ravenna, Rome, and Hispania. Notable acquaintances include bishop Faustus of Riez and his theological adversary Claudianus Mamertus. He was recognised in life for his literary accomplishments; in 456 his bronze portrait was added to the gallery of writers in the libraries of Trajan's Forum, the last statue to be erected there.

Sidonius spent time in the court of Theodoric II, king of the Visigoths, in 455 or 456 and wrote a letter about the experience to his brother-in-law Agricola. This letter, placed first in Sidonius's anthology of his correspondence, praises Theodoric as an ideal king.

Sidonius's father-in-law, Avitus became emperor in 455 and Sidonius wrote a panegyric for him. In 457 Majorian deprived Avitus of the empire and seized the city of Lyons; Sidonius fell into his hands. However, the reputation of Sidonius's learning led Majorian to treat him with the greatest respect. In return Sidonius composed a panegyric in his honour (as he had previously done for Avitus), which won for him a statue at Rome and the title of comes. In 468 the emperor Anthemius appointed him Urban Prefect of Rome, a post he held until 469. Sidonius presents this as a reward for his literary ability and especially the panegyric which he had written in honour of Anthemius, but the appointment was probably also part of Anthemius's efforts to win the support of the Roman aristocrats in Gaul. Afterwards, Anthemius made him a Patrician and Senator.

=== Bishop ===
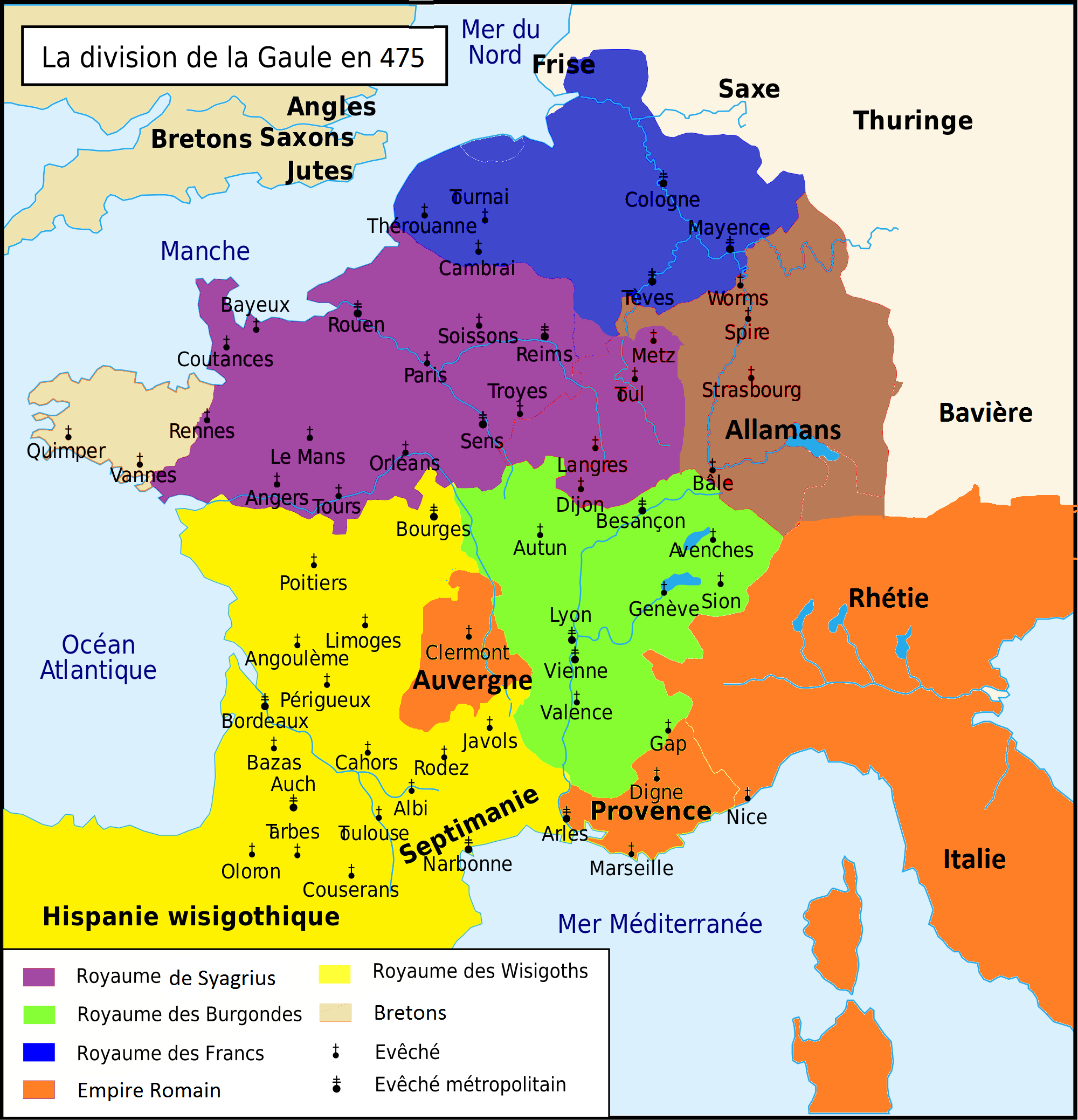
Map of Gaul in 475, on the eve of Euric's conquest of Clermont. Yellow: Visigothic kingdom; Orange: Western Roman Empire; Green: Burgundian kingdom.

In 469, Sidonius was elected to succeed Eparchius, a relative of his wife, as Bishop of Averna (Clermont) (Auvergne). He says little about this in his writing and it appears that he had not desired the role. Writing to the former praetorian prefect Tonantius Ferreolus, he encourages him to exchange his secular life "among Valentinian's prefects" for a religious life "among Christ's perfected men". Gregory of Tours speaks of Sidonius as a man who could celebrate Mass from memory (without a sacramentary) and give spontaneous speeches without any hesitation. Sidonius writes in praise of the aristocrats who supported the Church, ascetics, and authors of theological works, including those who incorporated pagan philosophy in their works. On becoming a bishop, he publicly declared that he would give up pagan poetry, as incompatible with a religious life, but he continued to write and exchange poetry privately.

For three years, from 473 to 475, Sidonius and his brother-in-law Ecdicus led the defense of Clermont, which was attacked annually by the Visigoths under king Euric. Sidonius compared the conflict to the Carthaginian capture of Capua during the Second Punic War, casting Euric in the role of Hannibal and himself as Decius Magius, loyally defending the city on behalf of Rome. When the city was finally conquered, he was imprisoned and exiled to Liviana, but Euric allowed him to return and resume his office as bishop in 476 or 477, following an intervention by the king's advisor Leo. Sidonius maintained connections with Euric's court thereafter. Euric favoured Arianism over Trinitarianism and Sidonius maintained contacts with Catholic clergy throughout Gaul and beyond, in order to support them in legal disputes and with recommendations.

Sidonius accepted a degree of collaboration with Euric's court as necessary to maintain the unity of the Roman aristocracy in Gaul, but he was hostile to the Goths, writing to a senator "You shun barbarians because they have a bad reputation; I avoid them, even when they have a good one." He mocks the literary pretensions of Euric's court, which was known as the Athenaeum, and presents the Visigothic conquest as responsible for a reversal of the social order, which had placed the uneducated in power over the educated. He was involved in legal disputes with a Gothic noble who had seized the majority of his mother-in-law's lands and clashed with Seronatus, whom he considered a collaborator, for encouraging them to billet their troops in the villas of Roman aristocrats. His hostility to Euric is reflected in his decision to open his letter collection, published around 477, with a letter enthusiastically praising Theoderic II, whom Euric had murdered in order to assume the Visigothic throne.

Sidonius was still living in 481, but had died by 490, when his successor as bishop, Aprunculus, died. His date of death was 21 or 23 August. Following his death he was venerated as a saint in Aremorica (which covered parts of modern day Brittany and Normandy).

=== Descendants ===
Sidonius's relations have been traced over several generations as a narrative of a family's fortunes, from the prominence of his paternal grandfather's time into later decline in the 6th century under the Franks. Sidonius's son Apollinaris, who was a correspondent of Ruricius of Limoges, commanded a unit raised in Auvergne at the Battle of Vouille in 507, where Clovis led the Franks to a decisive victory over the Visigoths. He was also bishop of Clermont for four months before his death. Sidonius's grandson, Arcadius, on hearing a rumor that the Frankish king Theuderic I had died, betrayed Clermont to Childebert I, only to abandon his wife and mother when Theuderic appeared; his other appearance in the history of Gregory of Tours is as a servant of King Childebert.

== Works ==
=== Carmina ===
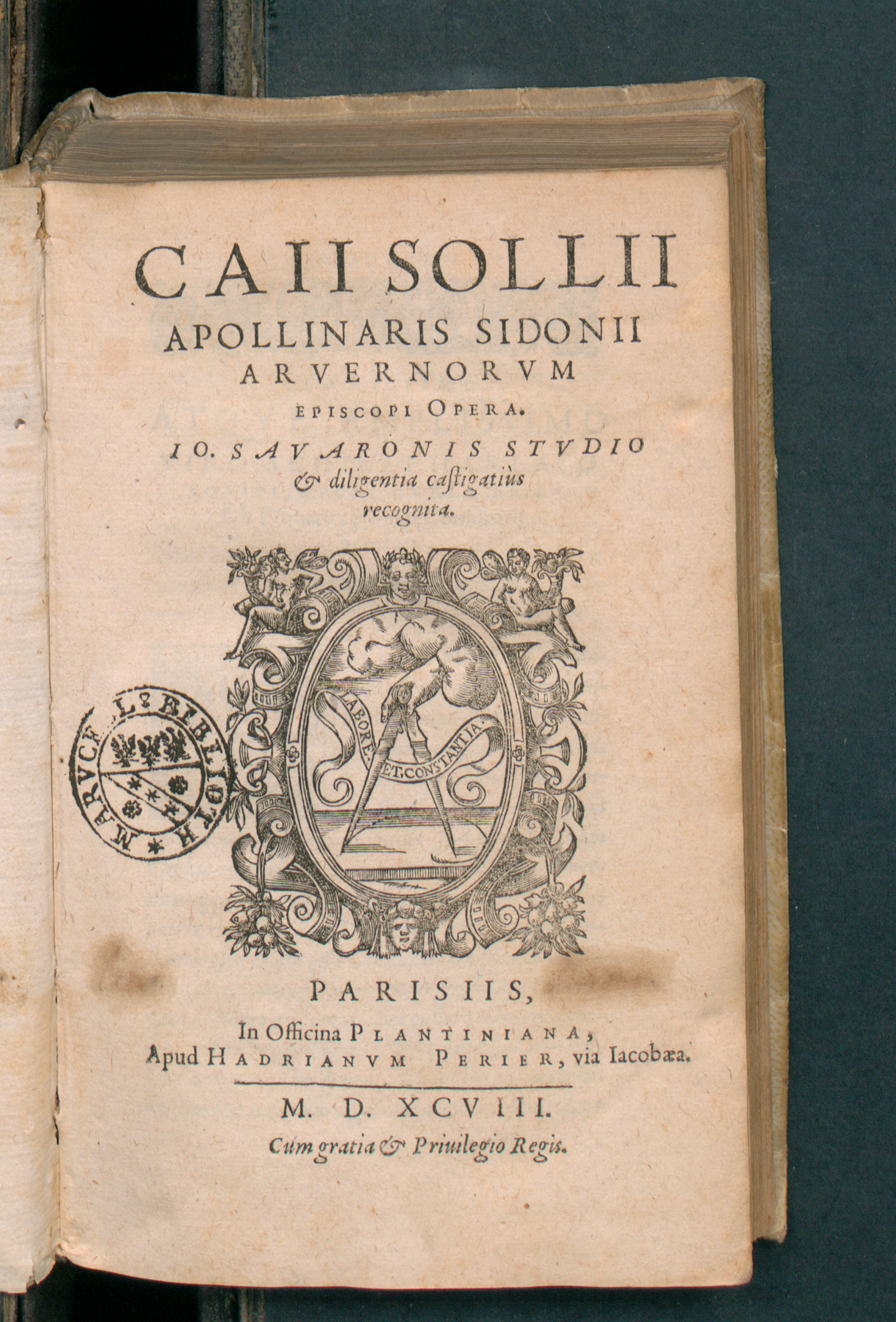
Opera (1598)

A collection of twenty-four Carmina by Sidonius survives, consisting of occasional verse, including panegyrics on different emperors, which document several important political events and draw largely upon Statius, Ausonius and Claudian. Sidonius emphasises Rome's past successes and glories as a "crisis mirror" for contemporary rulers, suggesting both the degree to which Rome had declined but also the possibility of revitalisation. In both Carmen 7 for Avitus and Carmen 5 for Majorian, Sidonius reviews past emperors and concludes that only those who earnt the title through virtue, especially the military virtue of Vespasian and above all Trajan, deserved praise – an implicit challenge to the new emperors. Other virtues are also important; Carmen 2 praises Anthemius for his mastery of the liberal arts.

Other poems have different subjects. For example, Carmen 22 is an ecphrasis of a painting of the Third Mithridatic War on the wall of the villa of Pontius Leontius "Dionysus", one of Sidonius's friends, at Burgus. Sidonius's visit to the villa is compared to a meeting of Apollo with Dionysus, at which they decide to settle in Aquitania and establish learned symposiastic culture there.

=== Letters ===
Nine books of Letters are preserved, containing a total of 147 documents, addressed to 117 different individuals. Sidonius worked on his letter collection over a protracted period, publishing some of them in the early 470s and producing the final version of his collection around 477. The collection was dedicated to Constantius, a priest in Lyon, who was a personal friend, with apologies to the Praetorian Prefect Tonantius Ferreolus, on the grounds that even a minor priest ought to be put before even the greatest members of the laity, because Constantius had helped to edit the volume, and because of Constantius's advice following the siege of Clairmont in 473.

Sidonius's Latin style was highly praised in his own time. His contemporary, Claudianus Mamertus, dubbed him the "resuscitator of ancient eloquence." By contrast, in his introduction to his translation of Sidonius's letters in 1939, W. B. Anderson characterised them as very stilted in diction, but revealing him as a man of genial temper, fond of good living and of pleasure. Sigrid Mratschek characterises Sidonius's Latin as intentionally elaborate and learned, calling it

... a language artfully and artistically fashioned from a complex intertextual weave of classical and biblical allusions, and the exclusive preserve of the cultural elite to whom alone it made sense. For Sidonius and his circle the beauty of the Latin language (sermonis pompa Latini) ... refined sensibility and the intellectual life were a bulwark against the barbarians and a last refuge from the progressive dissolution of the old order.

— Mratschek 2020, pp. 237–238

The complexity of the allusions to mythical, historical, biblical exempla often makes his writing very difficult to understand, but the difficulty was intentional and Sidonius disparages those unwilling to put in the effort necessary for a complete education in Roman language, literature, and culture. For Sidonius, familiarity with Classical Latin authors was the central point of education and the justification for the social position of the aristocrat; he says that difference between educated and uneducated men is the same as the difference between men and animals.

W. B. Anderson notes, "Whatever one may think about their style and diction, the letters of Sidonius are an invaluable source of information on many aspects of the life of his time." Many studies have used the letters in order to reconstruct the social networks of the intelligentsia in fourth-century Gaul. However, the letters cannot be treated as straightforward depictions of Sidonius's times. Sidonius actively models his letters and their representations of his contemporary world on those of earlier epistolographers, notably Pliny the Younger. He represents Rome as a model society. Peter Brown argues that the resulting picture of continuity is actually a response to the rapidity of change in his contemporary Gaul. Sigrid Mratschek says that through his literary work, he sought to build up the literary and cultural element of Roman identity, as compensation for Rome's military and political collapse, to reinforce the position of the Roman aristocracy in Gaul, and the church.

A letter of Sidonius's addressed to Riothamus, "King of the Brittones" (c. 470) is of particular interest, since it provides evidence that a king or military leader with ties to Britain lived around the time frame of King Arthur. An English translation of his poetry and letters by W. B. Anderson, with accompanying Latin text, have been published by the Loeb Classical Library (volume 1, containing his poems and books 1–2 of his letters, 1939; remainder of letters, 1965).

=== Manuscript tradition ===
Although Sidonius's works may have been published in part during his lifetime (5th century), there is no textual evidence of this and all manuscripts can be traced back to a single archetype, which is estimated as dating to roughly the 7th century. The oldest witness dates to the 9th century and is likely a fourth-generation copy. Although the archetype contained poems, they were omitted in most copies, and most extant manuscripts contain only his letters, often jumbled together with a garbled transcription of another writer, Ausonius. Most of the work on textual variants was done by Christian Lütjohann in the 1870s, but Lütjohann died prematurely before he had developed the stemmatics, which are crucial for reconstructing Sidonius's idiosyncratic Latin. Lütjohann's work was published in the 1887 Monumenta Germaniae Historica with inferior stemmatics provided by other scholars. Franz Dolveck provided a partial new stemma, including only those editions complete with poetry, in 2020.

== Editions and commentaries ==
- Hindermann, Judith, ed. (2022). Sidonius Apollinaris' letters, book 2: text, translation and commentary. Edinburgh: Edinburgh University Press. ISBN 9781399506304.
- Marolla, Giulia, ed. (2023). Sidonius - Letters book 5, part 1: text, translation and commentary. Edinburgh: Edinburgh University Press. ISBN 9781399510776.
- Waarden, Johannes Alexander van (2016). Writing to survive: a commentary on Sidonius Apollinaris letters book 7. Leuven Paris Bristol: Peeters. ISBN 9789042933538.
- Joop van Waarden, Sidonius Apollinaris. Selected Letters, Cambridge "Green & Yellows", Cambridge University Press, 2026. ISBN 978-1-009-08762-9.

== Sources and further reading ==
- Brown, Peter (2012). Through the Eye of a Needle: Wealth, the Fall of Rome, and the Making of Christianity in the West, 350–550 AD. Princeton University Press. ISBN 978-0-691-15290-5.
- Nora Chadwick, Poetry and Letters in Early Christian Gaul London: Bowes and Bowes, 1955.
- Egetenmeyr, Veronika; Wiesehöfer, Josef (2022). Die Konstruktion der "Anderen": Barbarenbilder in den Briefen des Sidonius Apollinaris. Wiesbaden: Harrassowitz Verlag. ISBN 9783447119061.
- M. P. Hanaghan, Reading Sidonius' Epistles, Cambridge: Cambridge University Press, 2019.
- Harries, Jill (1994). Sidonius Apollinaris and the Fall of Rome, AD 407-485. Oxford: Clarendon Press. ISBN 978-0-19-814472-4.
- Harries, Jill (2018). "Sidonius Apollinaris". In Nicholson, Oliver (ed.). The Oxford Dictionary of Late Antiquity, Volume 2: J–Z. Oxford: Oxford University Press. pp. 1379–1380. ISBN 978-0-19-881625-6.
- Kelly, Gavin (18 March 2020). Edinburgh Companion to Sidonius Apollinaris. Edinburgh University Press. ISBN 978-1-4744-6170-2.
- Gavin Kelly and Joop van Waarden (eds), The Edinburgh Companion to Sidonius Apollinaris, Edinburgh: Edinburgh University Press, 2020.
- Sigrid Mratschek, "Identitätsstiftung aus der Vergangenheit: Zum Diskurs über die trajanische Bildungskultur im Kreis des Sidonius Apollinaris", in Therese Fuhrer (hg), Die christlich-philosophischen Diskurse der Spätantike: Texte, Personen, Institutionen: Akten der Tagung vom 22–25. Februar 2006 am Zentrum für Antike und Moderne der Albert-Ludwigs-Universität Freiburg (Stuttgart, Franz Steiner Verlag, 2008) (Philosophie der Antike, 28),
- Mratschek, Sigrid (2020). "Sidonius' Social World / Creating Culture and Presenting the Self in Sidonius". In Kelly, Gavin; van Waarden, Joop (eds.). The Edinburgh Companion to Sidonius Apollinaris. Edinburgh: Edinburgh University Press. pp. 214–260.
- C. E. Stevens, Sidonius Apollinaris and his Age. Oxford: University Press, 1933.
- K. F. Stroheker. Der senatorische Adel im spätantiken Gallien. Tübingen, 1948.
- Waarden, Johannes Alexander van; Kelly, Gavin (2013). New approaches to Sidonius Apollinaris: Briefe Buch I. Leuven Paris Walpole: Peeters. ISBN 9789042929289.
- Martindale, John R., ed. (1980). The Prosopography of the Later Roman Empire: Volume II, AD 395–527. Cambridge: Cambridge University Press. ISBN 0-521-20159-4.
