= 460s =

Decade

The 460s decade ran from January 1, 460, to December 31, 469.

== Events ==
=== By place ===
==== Roman Empire ====
- Emperor Majorian gathers an expeditionary force (Alans and other barbarians) in Liguria, and enters Aquitaine after a long march, where he visits King Theodoric II at Toulouse.
- Majorian invades Hispania; his generals Nepotianus and Sunieric lead a Visigoth army into Gallaecia. The Suebi are defeated and Lusitania (modern Portugal) is conquered.
- King Genseric, fearing a Roman invasion, tries to negotiate peace with Majorian, who refuses. The Vandals devastate Mauretania and Moorish warriors poison the wells.
- Majorian assembles a large fleet in Nova Carthago (Cartagena) in preparation for an invasion of the Vandal Kingdom in Africa. However, King Genseric organizes an attack on the fleet, using individuals sympathetic to the Vandals to conduct the raid. The fleet is destroyed and the expedition is abandoned.
- Emperor Leo I founds the Excubitors (imperial guard) at Constantinople; this elite tagmatic unit (300 men) is recruited from among the warlike Isaurians (approximate date).

==== Europe ====
- March 27 (night) – Swabians invade the Gallic city of Lugo. The governor is killed.

==== Asia ====
- The Hepthalites (White Huns) conquer the remnants of the Kushan Empire and enter India.
- A famine that will last for several years begins in the Persian Empire (approximate date).

=== By topic ===
==== Art ====
- The remodeling of the dome of Baptistry of Neon at Ravenna (Italy) is finished.
- The Ajanta Caves (India) are completed (cut into the volcanic rock and elaborately painted).
- The seated Buddha in the Yungang Grottoes, Datong (Shanxi), is made (approximate date).

==== Religion ====
- The Coptic Orthodox Church (Egypt) splits from the Chalcedonian Orthodox Church of Alexandria.
- Gennadius I, patriarch of Constantinople, banishes Timothy II, patriarch of Alexandria.

=== By place ===
==== Roman Empire ====
- August 2 – Majorian is arrested near Tortona (Northern Italy), and deposed by Ricimer (magister militum) as puppet emperor.
- August 7 – Majorian, having been beaten and tortured for five days, is beheaded near the Iria River (Lombardy).
- Olybrius becomes the second candidate for the western throne. He is the husband of Placidia, who is being held in Vandal captivity.
- November 19 – Libius Severus, Roman senator from Lucania, is declared emperor of the Western Roman Empire.
- Vandal War (461-468): King Genseric continues the Vandal raids on the coast of Sicily and Italy. Ricimer sends an embassy to Carthage.

==== Europe ====
- Roman civil war of 461
  - The Visigoths under king Theodoric II recapture Septimania (Southern Gaul) after the assassination of Majorian, and invade Hispania again.
  - Aegidius becomes ruler over the Domain of Soissons (Gaul). He has friendly relations with the Romano-British (in Brittany).

==== Anatolia ====
- 461 Apahunik' earthquake. It affected the province of Apahunik', located to the north of Lake Van, in Anatolia.

=== By topic ===
==== Religion ====
- November 10 – Pope Leo I dies at Rome, age 61 (approximate), after a 21-year reign in which he has resisted Manichaeism and defended the Church against Nestorianism. He is succeeded by Hilarius as the 46th pope.
- Mamertus is elected bishop of Vienne (Gaul).

=== By place ===
==== Roman Empire ====
- September 1 – Possible start of the first Byzantine indiction cycle.
- Vandal War (461-468): After negotiations, Emperor Leo I pays a large ransom for Licinia Eudoxia and Placidia. They return after seven years of captivity in Carthage.
- The Monastery of Stoudios is founded in Constantinople.

==== Asia ====
- The Daming calendar is introduced in China by mathematician Zu Chongzhi (approximate date).

=== By place ===
==== Europe ====
- In the Gothic war against Aegidius, Childeric I, king of the Salian Franks, allies with the Roman general Aegidius. This war is ended by the battle near Orléans, where the Visigoths under King Theodoric II are defeated by the Franks, while crossing the Loire River.
- The Suebi live under a diarchy, and fight a civil war over the kingship in Galicia (Northern Spain).

==== Asia ====
- The Kibi Clan Rebellion against the Yamato state (Japan) in the Korean Peninsula begins.

=== By place ===
==== Roman Empire ====
- Olybrius is elected Roman consul by the Eastern court in Constantinople.

==== Europe ====
- The Suevic nation in Galicia (Northern Spain) is unified under King Remismund.
- King Theodoric II sends Remismund gifts (for recognizing his kingship), including weapons, and a Gothic princess for a wife.
- Aegidius dies (possibly poisoned) and is succeeded by his son Syagrius, who becomes ruler of the Domain of Soissons (Gaul).

=== By place ===
==== Roman Empire ====
- Basiliscus, with the help of his sister Verina (wife of emperor Leo I), becomes a consul in the Eastern Roman Empire.
- August 15 – Libius Severus, puppet emperor of the Western Roman Empire, dies after a 4-year reign.
- September 2 – A fire begins in Constantinople and, over the next six days, destroys the buildings in eight of the 14 sections into which the Eastern Roman Imperial capital had been divided.
- Ricimer, de facto ruler, establishes political control for 2 years from his residence in Rome.

==== Britannia ====
- Battle of Wippedesfleot: The Saxons under command of Hengist and Aesc are defeated by the Britons near Ebbsfleet (Kent). During the battle 12 Welsh leaders are killed (according to the Anglo-Saxon Chronicle).

==== Europe ====
- King Remismund establishes a policy of friendship with the Visigoths, and promotes the conversion of the Suebi into Arianism in Galicia (Northern Spain).

==== China ====
- Qian Fei Di, then Ming Di, becomes ruler of the Liu Song dynasty after his nephew is assassinated.

=== By topic ===
==== Religion ====
- November 19 – Pope Hilarius convokes a synod at Rome's Church of Santa Maria Maggiore.
- Peter the Fuller becomes patriarch of Antioch (approximate date).

=== By place ===
==== Roman Empire ====
- Emperor Leo I repels the Hun invasion of Dacia (modern Romania). They ravage the Balkans but are unable to take Constantinople thanks to the city walls, which are rebuilt and reinforced.
- Tarasicodissa, an Isaurian officer, comes with evidence that Ardabur (magister militum) is forming a conspiracy against Leo I. Ardabur is arrested for treason.
- Tarasicodissa adopts the Greek name of Zeno and marries Ariadne, eldest daughter of Leo I (approximate date).

==== Europe ====
- King Theodoric II is killed by his younger brother Euric, who succeeds him on the throne. He conquers Hispania and the harbor city of Marseille (Southern Gaul), adding them to the existing Visigothic Kingdom.
- Euric sends an embassy to the Eastern Roman Empire for recognition of the Visigoth sovereignty. He forms an alliance with the Suebi and the Vandals.
- A council of twelve townships emerges on the islands in the Venetian lagoon, to form a basic system of governance (approximate date).

==== Asia ====
- King Mehama of the Alkhans was victorious in a battle against the Kidarites.

=== By topic ===
==== Religion ====
- Peter the Fuller is deposed as patriarch of Antioch; Julian is elected as his successor.

=== By place ===
==== Roman Empire ====
- April 12 – Emperor Leo I has his general Anthemius elected emperor of the Western Roman Empire. He allies himself with Ricimer, de facto ruler of Rome, and marries Anthemius's daughter Alypia to him, to strengthen the relationship and end the hostilities between the Eastern and Western Empire.
- Summer – Vandal War (461-468): King Genseric extends his pirate raids in the Mediterranean Sea; the Vandals sack and enslave the people living in Illyricum, the Peloponnese and other parts of Greece. Leo I joins forces with the Western Empire.

==== Britannia ====
- Ancient Hillforts in Britain are re-fortified, and the Wansdyke is built (approximate date).

==== Asia ====
- Emperor Skandagupta dies after a 12-year reign, as the Huns consolidate their conquests in western India. He is succeeded by his half-brother Purugupta.

=== By place ===
==== Roman Empire ====
- Emperor Leo I assembles a massive naval expedition at Constantinople, which costs 64,000 pounds of gold (more than a year's revenue) and consists of over 1,100 ships carrying 100,000 men. It is the greatest fleet ever sent against the Vandals and brings Leo near to bankruptcy.
- Emperor Anthemius sends a Roman expedition under command of Marcellinus. He expels the Vandals from Sicily and retakes Sardinia. The Eastern general Heraclius of Edessa lands with a force on the Libyan coast, east of Carthage, and advances from Tripolitania.
- Battle of Cape Bon: The Vandals defeat the Roman navy under Basiliscus, anchored at Promontorium Mercurii, 45 miles from Carthage (Tunisia). During peace negotiations Genseric uses fire ships, filling them with brushwood and pots of oil, destroying 700 imperial galleys. Basiliscus escapes with his surviving fleet to Sicily, harassed all the way by Moorish pirates.
- August – Marcellinus is murdered in Sicily, probably at the instigation of his political rival, Ricimer. Heraclius is left to fight alone against the Vandals; after a 2-year campaign in the desert he returns to Constantinople.
- Basiliscus returns to Constantinople after a disastrous expedition against the Vandals. He is forced to seek sanctuary in the church of Hagia Sophia to escape the wrath of the people. Leo I gives him imperial pardon, but banishes him for 3 years to Heraclea Sintica (Thrace).
- Dengizich, son of Attila the Hun, sends an embassy to Constantinople to demand money. Leo I offers the Huns settlement in Thrace in exchange for recognition of his authority. Dengizich refuses and crosses the Danube.
- Revolt of Euric: The Goths in Aquitania revolts. Their king Euric occupies the south of Gaul.
- Roman forces under Anagast defeat the Huns at the river Utus (Vit, Bulgaria). Dengizich is killed and his head is paraded through the streets of Constantinople. Stuck on the end of a wooden pole, it is displayed above the Xylokerkos Gate.
- The Vandals reconquer Sicily, administering a decisive defeat to the Western forces.

==== Jiaozhou (Vietnam) ====
- March – Jiaozhou governor Lưu Mục dies of illness. Lý Trường Nhân, a nobleman, launches a coup d'état against the Jiaozhou government, kills the Liu Song officials in Jiaozhou, seizes control of the citadel, then declares himself the governor.
- August – Emperor Ming of Song grants Lưu Bột the title of Jiaozhou governor, along with an army to retake Jiaozhou from Lý Trường Nhân. After landing in Jiaozhou, Lưu Bột is quickly defeated by Lý Trường Nhân, and dies shortly afterward.
- November – Lý Trường Nhân sends an envoy to make peace with the Liu Song, and requests the title of "Hành Châu sự", a position with less authority than that of the Governor of Jiaozhou. Emperor Ming approves Trường Nhân's request, granting him the authority to govern Jiaozhou until 479.

=== By topic ===
==== Religion ====
- February 29 – Pope Hilarius dies at Rome after a 6½-year reign, and is succeeded by Simplicius as the 47th pope.

=== By place ===
==== Roman Empire ====
- Ostrogoth prince Theodoric, age 15, returns to Pannonia, after living as a child hostage at the court of Emperor Leo I in Constantinople (see 459).
- Revolt of Euric:
  - King Euric defeated the Romano-Breton army of Riothamus at Déols (modern Châteauroux).
  - Adovacrius defeats Paulus in the Battle of Angers
- Roman lord Lusidius surrenders Lisbon to the Suevi.

==== Europe ====
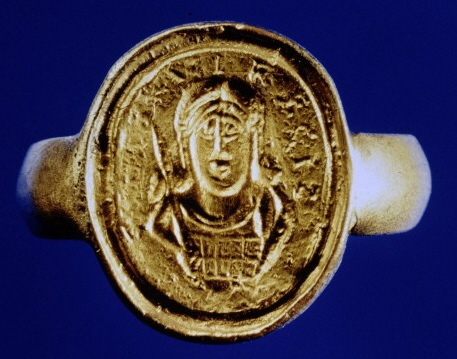
Copy of the signet ring of King Childeric I

- The Vandals invade Epirus (modern Greece). They are expelled from the Peloponnese (Greece) and in retaliation, the Vandals take 500 hostages at Zakynthos. On the way back to Carthage they are slaughtered.

=== By topic ===
==== Religion ====
- The Vatican makes a pact with the Salian Frankish king Childeric I, agreeing to call him "the new Constantine" on condition that he accept conversion to Christianity.

== Births ==
460

- Saint Kessog in Cashel, an Irish missionary
- Budic II, king of Brittany (approximate date)
- Hilderic, king of the Vandals and Alans (approximate date)
- Romulus Augustulus, last emperor of the Western Roman Empire (approximate date)
- Sanghapala, Mon-Khmer monk (d. 524)

461

- Hilderic, king of the Vandals (approximate date)
- Romulus Augustulus, emperor of the Western Roman Empire

462

- Anicia Juliana, daughter of Olybrius
- Muryeong, king of Baekje (Korea)
- Yu Zhong, official and regent of Northern Wei (d. 518)

463

- Houfei Di, emperor of the Liu Song dynasty (d. 477)

464

- Hashim ibn 'Abd Manaf, great-grandfather of Mohammed (approximate date)
- Wu Di, Chinese emperor of the Liang dynasty (d. 549)

465

- July 5 – Ahkal Moʼ Nahb I, Maya ruler of Palenque (d. 524)
- Dubricius, bishop and saint (approximate date)
- Liberius, Roman aristocrat (approximate date)
- Procopius of Gaza, Christian sophist and rhetorician (approximate date)
- Severus, patriarch of Antioch (approximate date)
- Zacharias Rhetor, bishop and ecclesiastic historian (approximate date)

466

- Arthur, king of the Britons (approximate date according to legend)
- Clovis I, first king of the Franks (approximate date)
- Xu Mian, high official of the Liang dynasty (d. 535)

467

- October 13 – Emperor Xiaowen of Northern Wei (d. 499)
- Cerdic, first king of Anglo-Saxon Wessex (approximate date)
- Leo II, Byzantine emperor (d. 474)

468

- Nectan of Hartland, Welsh prince and saint (approximate date)

469

- Emperor Shun of Liu Song, Chinese emperor of Liu Song (d. 479)
- Zhou She, high official of the Liang dynasty (d. 524)

== Deaths ==
460

- October 20 – Aelia Eudocia, Roman empress and wife of Theodosius II
- Ardaric, king of the Gepids (approximate date)
- Juqu Anzhou, prince of the Chinese Xiongnu states Northern Liang
- Maldras, king of the Sueves
- Isaac of Antioch, Syriac theologian

461

- August 7 – Majorian, emperor of the Western Roman Empire
- November 10 – Pope Leo I
- Palladius, first bishop of Ireland (approximate date)

462

- Lóegaire mac Néill, High King of Ireland

463

- Frumar, Suevic king of Galicia (approximate date)
- Richimund, Suevic king of Galicia (approximate date)
- Romanus of Condat, hermit and saint (approximate date)

464

- Aegidius, Roman general (magister militum) (approximate date)
- Conall Gulban, king of Tir Chonaill (approximate date)
- Wang Xianyuan, empress and wife of Xiao Wu Di (b. 427)
- Xiao Wu Di, emperor of the Liu Song dynasty (b. 430)

465

- May 5 – Gerontius, Archbishop of Milan
- June 20 – Wen Cheng Di, emperor of Northern Wei (b. 440)
- August 15 – Libius Severus, emperor of the Western Roman Empire
- Buliugu Li, official of the Northern Wei dynasty
- Eógan mac Néill, king of Tír Eoghain (Ireland)
- Liu Chuyu, princess of the Liu Song dynasty

466

- January 1 – Emperor Qianfei, emperor of the Liu Song dynasty (b. 449)
- Liu Zixun, prince and pretender of Liu Song (b. 456)
- Lu Huinan, empress dowager of Liu Song (b. 412)
- Theodoret of Cyprus, theologian
- Theodoric II, king of the Visigoths
- Yifu Hun, high official of Northern Wei

467

- Benignus of Armagh, Irish bishop (approximate date)
- Skandagupta, ruler of the Gupta Empire (India)

468

- February 29, – Pope Hilarius
- Gunabhadra, Indian Buddhist scholar-monk (b. 394)
- Marcellinus, Roman general (magister militum)

469

- Dengizich, king of the Huns (approximate date)
- Hydatius, bishop of Aquae Flaviae (approximate date)
- Remismund, king of the Sueves
