= Battle of Arles (471) =

Visigothic victory over the Western Romans

- Part of the Revolt of Euric and Roman–Germanic Wars
Date	471
Location	Arelate, Viennensis II (now Arles, France) 43.677°N 4.628°E
Result	Visigothic victory

Belligerents
Visigoths	Western Roman Empire

Commanders and leaders
Euric	Anthemiolus †

Strength
Unknown	Unknown

Casualties and losses
Unknown	Unknown

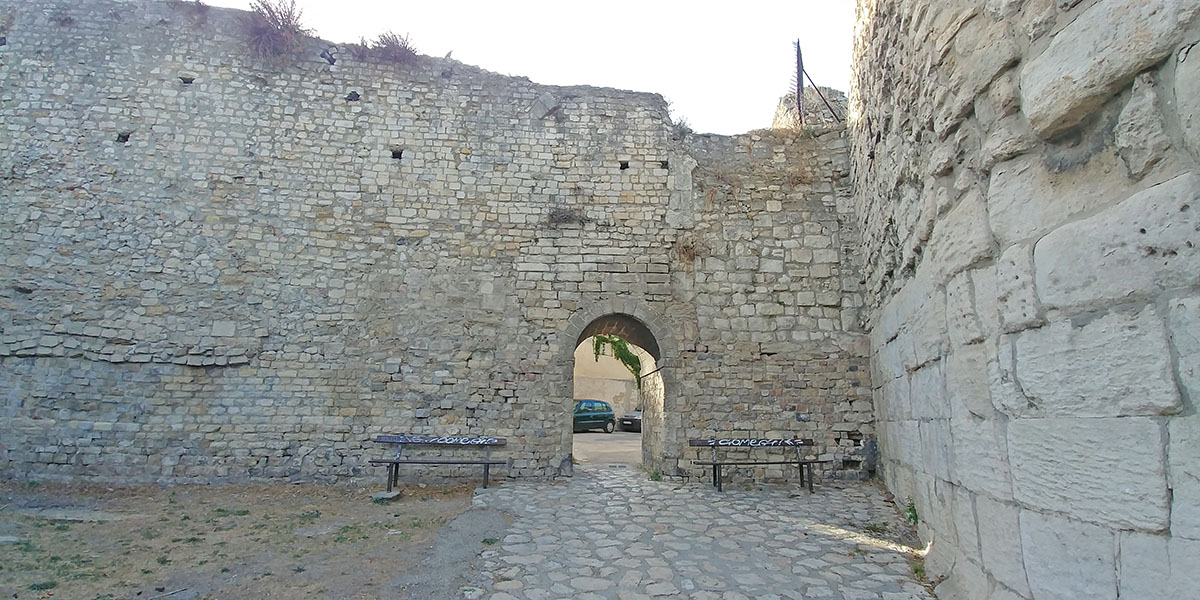
Augustus Gate, part of the walls that protected Arles during the rule of the Roman Empire.

The Battle of Arles was fought between the Visigoths and the Western Roman Empire in 471. Prior to the battle, the Visigoths had advanced past the Bretons at the Battle of Déols in 469, and were expanding into Aquitaine. Alarmed with this development, Emperor Anthemius sent an expedition under Anthemiolus across the Alps against the Visigothic king Euric, who was besieging Arles.

== The importance of Arles ==
The Battle of Arles in 471 was not a stand-alone meeting, but the final piece of a broader power struggle fought between 468 and 471 in Gaul. The outcome of this battle radically changed political relations in the West. In these years, the Visigothic rex Euric tried to definitively detach himself from the subordinate position that the Visigoths took within the Western Roman Empire, while Emperor Anthemius tried to maintain the remaining coherence of West Roman rule.

Within this power struggle, Arles was of decisive importance. The city dominated the Rhone Valley, the main connection between North Gaul, Italy and the Mediterranean Sea. This natural corridor between the Central Massive and the Alps was a crucial route for troop movements, communication and supply. Those who controlled Arles actually controlled strategic access to Gaul.

For Euric, the conquest of Arles offered the opportunity to create an independent Visigothic area of power that stretched from Aquitaine to Hispania. At the same time, he was able to isolate the remaining Roman power structures in Gaul from Italy. For Anthemius, the preservation of Arles was at least equally essential: as long as the city remained in Roman hands, the West retained some influence over Gaul and the connection with the northern provinces remained intact.

== Cause ==
The direct reason for the crisis was the failure of the great Roman expedition against the Vandals in 468. Under the leadership of the Eastern Roman Emperor Leo I and in collaboration with Anthemius, the empire tried to reconquer the province of Africa from Geiseric. However, the expedition ended in a catastrophic defeat at Cape Bon. With this, the West lost not only enormous financial resources, but probably also the last realistic prospect of restoring imperial power in the West.

Euric understood the implications of this defeat. As long as Rome had sufficient financial resources, fleet capacity and cooperation between East and West, the Visigothic position remained formally dependent on Roman legitimacy. After 468, this situation changed fundamentally. The West Roman regime was financially exhausted, militarily overloaded and politically divided. Euric saw this as an opportunity to definitively detach the Visigothic power from the Roman federate system.

== Course of the war ==
The war did not started in South Gaul, but in the north. Euric first tried to eliminate the remaining Roman power structures along the Loire and in Middle Gaul. In addition, there were confrontations with the Roman general Paulus and with the Frankish rex Childeric I.

At the same time, political loyalty within Gaul also began to disintegrate. An important example of this was Arvandus, the highest Roman ruler in Gaul, who took the side of Euric. This made it clear how much the central authority had now weakened. A subsequent important phase was the defeat of Riothamus. He presumably led a British-Roman force on behalf of Anthemius that had been sent to Gaul to stop the Visigothic expansion However, Euric probably managed to intercept and destroy this army at Déols. Strategically, this victory was of great importance, as it eliminated a mobile Roman intervention force before it could unite with the Gallic defense. Only then could Euric focus his full attention on the Rhône corridor and Arles. As the capital of the Gallic prefecture, Arles was not only an administrative center, but also a crucial hub of roads and river transport. The city was the main connection between North and South Gaul and between Gaul and Italy. It is unknown whether the city was taken or besieged by Euric.

== Struggle for Arles ==
In 471, the Western Roman regime still tried to organize a major counter-offensive to preserve Arles. Anthemius sent his son Anthemiolus along with the officers Thorisarius, Everdingus and Hermianus to Gaul to sack the city. The fact that the emperor charged his own son with this operation underlines the strategic importance of the enterprise. It was not a regular border campaign, but probably the last serious attempt to maintain the Roman position in Gaul.

Although no exact figures of army strength are available, the Roman army must have been significant. Both Anthemius and Ricimer realized that the loss of the Rhône Corridor would have disastrous consequences. It is therefore unlikely that only a symbolic force was deployed; an army of about ten thousand men or more seems plausible.

However, the attempt to retain Arles failed completely. East of the Rhone, the Roman army was intercepted and defeated by Euric's force. The battle must have been particularly fierce, as Anthemiolus died along with several senior officers.

== Consequences ==
With this defeat, the Western Roman Empire lost effective control of the Rhône corridor. This made Gaul strategically virtually unsustainable. Shortly after, Euric expanded his power further towards the Auvergne, while Hispania also became increasingly beyond the reach of the imperial government. The Battle of Arles thus formed the end of Eurics' power struggle against Rome between 468 and 471. What began as an opportunistic response to the Roman defeat against the Vandals ended in the definitive breakthrough of Visigothic hegemony in Gaul.

For Anthemius, the defeat meant a political disaster from which he no longer recovered. Within a year, the conflict between him and Ricimer escalated to an open war, after which Anthemius was killed in 472. Although the Western Roman Empire formally existed for a few more years, the strategic decision on the fate of Gaul had actually already fallen on Arles.
