= 469 =

469 in various calendars
- Gregorian calendar: 469; CDLXIX
- Ab urbe condita: 1222
- Assyrian calendar: 5219
- Balinese saka calendar: 390–391
- Bengali calendar: −125 – −124
- Berber calendar: 1419
- Buddhist calendar: 1013
- Burmese calendar: −169
- Byzantine calendar: 5977–5978
- Chinese calendar: 戊申年 (Earth Monkey); 3166 or 2959 — to — 己酉年 (Earth Rooster); 3167 or 2960
- Coptic calendar: 185–186
- Discordian calendar: 1635
- Ethiopian calendar: 461–462
- Hebrew calendar: 4229–4230
- Hindu calendars
- Vikram Samvat: 525–526
- Shaka Samvat: 390–391
- Kali Yuga: 3569–3570
- Holocene calendar: 10469
- Iranian calendar: 153 BP – 152 BP
- Islamic calendar: 158 BH – 157 BH
- Javanese calendar: 354–355
- Julian calendar: 469; CDLXIX
- Korean calendar: 2802
- Minguo calendar: 1443 before ROC 民前1443年
- Nanakshahi calendar: −999
- Seleucid era: 780/781 AG
- Thai solar calendar: 1011–1012
- Tibetan calendar: ས་ཕོ་སྤྲེ་ལོ་ (male Earth-Monkey); 595 or 214 or −558 — to — ས་མོ་བྱ་ལོ་ (female Earth-Bird); 596 or 215 or −557

Year 469 (CDLXIX) was a common year starting on Wednesday of the Julian calendar. At the time, it was known as the Year of the Consulship of Marcianus and Zeno (or, less frequently, year 1222 Ab urbe condita). The denomination 469 for this year has been used since the early medieval period, when the Anno Domini calendar era became the prevalent method in Europe for naming years.

== Events ==
=== By place ===
==== Roman Empire ====
- Ostrogoth prince Theodoric, age 15, returns to Pannonia, after living as a child hostage at the court of Emperor Leo I in Constantinople (see 459).
- Revolt of Euric:
  - King Euric defeated the Romano-Breton army of Riothamus at Déols (modern Châteauroux).
  - Adovacrius defeats Paulus in the Battle of Angers
- Roman lord Lusidius surrenders Lisbon to the Suevi.

==== Europe ====
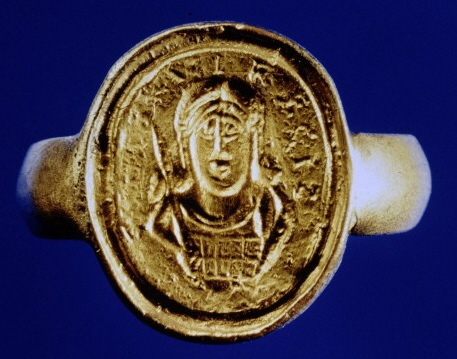
Copy of the signet ring of King Childeric I

- The Vandals invade Epirus (modern Greece). They are expelled from the Peloponnese (Greece) and in retaliation, the Vandals take 500 hostages at Zakynthos. On the way back to Carthage they are slaughtered.

=== By topic ===
==== Religion ====
- The Vatican makes a pact with the Salian Frankish king Childeric I, agreeing to call him "the new Constantine" on condition that he accept conversion to Christianity.

== Births ==
- Emperor Shun of Liu Song, Chinese emperor of Liu Song (d. 479)
- Zhou She, high official of the Liang dynasty (d. 524)

== Deaths ==
- Dengizich, king of the Huns (approximate date)
- Hydatius, bishop of Aquae Flaviae (approximate date)
- Remismund, king of the Sueves
