= Historicity of King Arthur =

Debate about whether King Arthur was a historical person

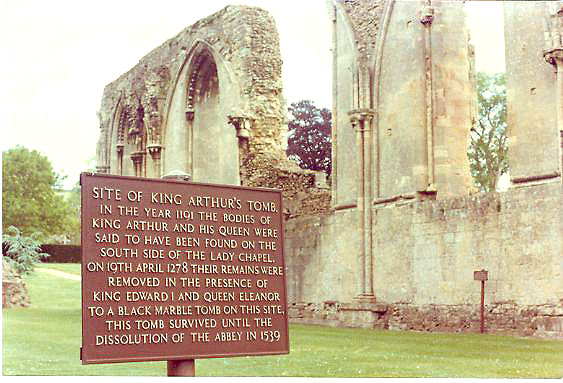
Site of a purported grave of Arthur in "Avalon" at Glastonbury Abbey

The historicity of King Arthur has been debated both by academics and popular writers. While there have been many claims that King Arthur was a real historical person, the current consensus among specialists on the period holds him to be a mythological or folkloric figure.

The first definite mention of Arthur appears circa 828 in the Historia Brittonum, where he is presented as a military leader fighting against the invading Saxons in 5th- to 6th-century Sub-Roman Britain at the Battle of Badon, more than three centuries before the work was written. Arthur developed into a legendary figure in the Matter of Britain from the 12th century, following Geoffrey of Monmouth's influential but largely fictional Historia Regum Britanniae.

Historians propose a variety of possible sources for the myth of Arthur, perhaps as a composite character. Historical figures involved in such theories include Artuir mac Áedán, a son of the 6th-century king of Dál Riata in modern Scotland; Ambrosius Aurelianus, who led a Romano-British resistance against the Saxons; Lucius Artorius Castus, a 2nd-century Roman commander of Sarmatian cavalry; and the British king Riothamus, who fought alongside the last Gallo-Roman commanders against the Visigoths in an expedition to Gaul in the 5th century. Others include the Welsh kings Owain Danwyn, Enniaun Girt, and Athrwys ap Meurig.

== Historiography ==
Until the late 20th century, there was academic debate about the historicity of Arthur among historians and archaeologists. In the 21st century, the academic consensus rejects it.

In the early 1900s Charles Oman noted that other historians such as James Henry Ramsay "frankly reject[ed] his historical existence", but declared "I must confess that I am not convinced by these arguments, and incline to think that a real figure lurks beneath the Historia Brittonum."

In 1936, R. G. Collingwood and J. N. L. Myres treated Arthur as a Roman comes Britanniarum. They asserted that "the historicity of [Arthur] can hardly be called into question", though they were careful to separate the historical Arthur from the legendary Arthur.

In 1971, Leslie Alcock claimed to "demonstrate that there is acceptable historical evidence that Arthur was a genuine historical figure, not a mere figment of myth or romance". Also in 1971, while conceding that Gildas does not mention Arthur, Frank Stenton wrote that this "may suggest that the Arthur of history was a less imposing figure than the Arthur of legend" but then argued that "it should not be allowed to remove him from the sphere of history." In 1977, John Morris argued in favour, but his work was widely criticised at the time as having "grave methodological flaws". David Dumville took the opposite position in the same year: "The fact of the matter is that there is no historical evidence about Arthur; we must reject him from our histories and, above all, from the titles of our books."

By 1986, Myres, who had written in 1936 (with Collingwood) that Arthur was historical, said "It is inconceivable that Gildas ... should not have mentioned Arthur's part ..." (that is, if he had existed) and complains that "No figure on the borderline of history and mythology has wasted more of the historian’s time." By 1991, the Biographical Dictionary of Dark Age Britain stated that "historians are tending to take a minimal view of the historical value of even the earliest evidence for Arthur, but most probably still see him as an historical figure ..." while "the chivalric Arthur ... was essentially the creation of Geoffrey of Monmouth in the twelfth century."

In 2003, Thomas Charles-Edwards' book on the period only mentioned Arthur in the context of a later Welsh story. In 2004, Francis Pryor dismissed the evidence that Arthur existed but says that proving he did not exist is as impossible as proving that he did. In 2007, O. J. Padel in the Oxford Dictionary of National Biography described Arthur as a "legendary warrior and supposed king of Britain". He was less dismissive in 2014, describing Arthur as "originally legendary or historical", but also cited the failure of the tenth century Welsh poem Armes Prydein, which prophesied the expulsion of the English from Britain, to mention Arthur among the ancient heroes who would return to lead the resistance.

In a 2007 review, Howard Wiseman followed Sheppard Frere (1967), saying that "the evidence allows, not requires belief", and follows Christopher Snyder (2000) in emphasising the need for a better understanding of the period, regardless of whether Arthur existed. In 2011, Robin Fleming's history of the period did not mention Arthur at all. In 2013, Guy Halsall reported that "among the academic community, the sceptics have decisively carried the day". In 2018, Nicholas J. Higham dismissed all the outstanding claims for a historical Arthur, summarising his position as: "That Arthur has produced extraordinary quantities of 'smoke' is in large part because he is so well suited to be a fulcrum of make-believe. But there is no historical 'fire' underlying the stories that congregated around him, just 'highland mist'." His book has been generally praised.

In a 2018 review, Tom Shippey summarised the situation by saying "modern academic historians want nothing to do with King Arthur." In a 2019 review, Brian David reported that "Few topics in late antique and medieval history elicit scholarly groans quite like the idea of a supposedly 'factual' King Arthur. Yet historians and other scholars made cases for Arthur’s existence in historical and literary studies until the 1980s. For academics today, the question of the realism of King Arthur has been largely banished to popular books, video games, and movies."

Andrew Breeze argued in 2015 and 2020 that Arthur was historical, and claims to have identified the locations of his battles as well as the place and date of his death. However, his conclusions were disputed.

== Etymology of "Arthur" ==
The origin of the name Arthur is unclear. One proposed etymology is from the Roman family name Artorius, itself of obscure and contested etymology, possibly of Messapic or Etruscan origin. Some scholars have noted that the legendary King Arthur's name only appears as Arthur, Arthurus, or Arturus in early Latin Arthurian texts, and never as Artōrius (although the Classical Latin Artōrius became Arturius in some Vulgar Latin dialects). However, it may not refer to the origin of the name Arthur, as Artōrius would regularly become Art(h)ur when borrowed into Welsh.

According to linguist and Celticist Stefan Zimmer, it is possible that Artorius has a Celtic origin, being a Latinization of the hypothetical name *Artorījos derived from the patronym *Arto-rīg-i̯os lit. 'Son of the Bear' or 'Warrior-King' ("i̯" stands for [j]). *Arto-rīg-i̯os is unattested, but the stem *arto-rīg- is the source of the Old Irish personal name Artrí.

John Morris argued that the appearance of the name Arthur among Scottish and Welsh figures suggests the name became popular in early 6th-century Britain for a short time. He proposed all such occurrences were due to the importance of another Arthur who may have ruled temporarily as Emperor of Britain, and suggested a period of Saxon advance was halted and turned back before resuming in the 570s.

== Early sources ==
=== Gildas and Badon ===
Arthur is not mentioned in Gildas' 6th-century book De Excidio et Conquestu Britanniae. Gildas does mention a British victory against the Saxons at the "Badonic mount" (mons Badonicus), which occurred in the year of Gildas' birth and ushered in a generation of peace between the two warring peoples. This engagement is now referred to as the Battle of Badon. Gildas describes the battle as taking place "in our times" and being one of the "latest, if not the greatest" slaughter of the Saxons, and that a new generation born after Badon had come of age in Britain. Later Cambro-Latin sources give the Old Welsh form of the battle's location as Badon, such as in the Annales Cambriae, and this has been adopted by most modern scholars.

Gildas' Latin is somewhat opaque; he does not name Arthur or any other leader of the battle. He does discuss Ambrosius Aurelianus as a great scourge of the Saxons immediately prior, but he seems to indicate that some time had passed between Ambrosius' victory and the Battle of Badon. The details of the battle, including its date and location, remain uncertain, with most scholars accepting a date around 500; numerous locations throughout Britain have been proposed over the years.

=== Historia Brittonum ===
Arthur is also not mentioned in Bede's Historia ecclesiastica gentis Anglorum (Ecclesiastical History of the English People), which dates to c. 731, or any other surviving work until around 829, the date ascribed to the Historia Brittonum, attributed to a Welsh ecclesiastic called Nennius. The Historia says: "Then in those days Arthur fought with the kings of the Britons against them [the Saxons] but he himself was the commander of battles (dux bellorum)". Twelve battles fought by Arthur are listed. Commenting on Arthur's post-Conquest portrayal as a king, the historian Nicholas Higham observes "Earlier texts are uniform in depicting Arthur solely as a warrior or a leader of warriors, whether ‘real’ or supernatural .... In the context of the central Middle Ages, it was a king's role to head the army, leading the forces of subaltern rulers. ‘Overkingship’ was well known, in Wales as elsewhere. It was a small step therefore from ‘commander of battles’ to a quasi-imperial figure commanding the Welsh kings as well as their forces. This was to prove a landmark shift within the Arthurian tradition, leading directly to 'King' Arthur."

=== Annales Cambriae ===
The earliest version of the Annales Cambriae (Welsh Annals) was composed in the mid-10th century. It gives the date of Badon as 516 and lists Arthur's death as occurring in 537 at the Battle of Camlann. Like the Annals, all other sources that name Arthur were written at least 400 years after the events which they describe.

=== Gesta Regum Anglorum ===
Arthur appears briefly in the Gesta Regum Anglorum ("Deeds of the Kings of the English") by William of Malmesbury in 1124. Despite its name, the work attempted to reconstruct British history in general by drawing together the varying accounts of Gildas, Bede, Nennius, and various chroniclers. The work considered Arthur as historical and featured Ambrosius Aurelianus as his apparent employer. Malmesbury also mentioned the finding of a tomb of a certain "Walwin" (a supposed nephew of Arthur) in the time of William the Conqueror.

=== Historia Regum Britanniae ===
Arthur was first styled as a king of the Britons in Geoffrey of Monmouth's pseudo-historical chronicle Historia Regum Britanniae (History of the Kings of Britain), which dates to c. 1136. (Note: Historia Regum Britanniae draws upon Gildas' De Excidio Britanniae, the Historia Brittonum, and the Annales Cambriae, among other sources.) Geoffrey also refers to Ambrosius Aurelianus (whom he calls Aurelius Ambrosius) as a king of Britain and an older brother of Uther Pendragon, father of Arthur, thus establishing a familial relationship between Aurelianus and Arthur. He identifies Aurelius Ambrosius as the son of Constantinus, a Breton ruler and brother of Aldroenus.

=== Hagiographies ===
Arthur is mentioned in several 12th- to 13th-century hagiographies of Welsh and Breton saints, including those of Cadoc, Carannog, Gildas, Goeznovius, Illtud, and Paternus. The Legenda Sancti Goeznovii is a hagiography of the Breton saint Goeznovius which was formerly dated to c. 1019 but is now dated to the late 12th to early 13th century. It includes a brief segment dealing with Arthur and a leader known as Vortigern.

=== Bardic sources ===
There are a number of mentions of a legendary hero called Arthur in early Welsh and Breton poetry. These sources are preserved in High Medieval manuscripts and cannot be dated with accuracy. They are mostly placed in the 9th to 10th century, although some authors have dated them to as early as the 7th century. The earliest of these would appear to be the Old Welsh poem Y Gododdin, preserved in a 13th-century manuscript. It refers to a warrior who "glutted black ravens [i.e., killed many men] on the rampart of the stronghold, although he was no Arthur."

The Welsh poem Geraint, son of Erbin describes a battle at a port-settlement and mentions Arthur in passing. The work is a praise-poem and elegy for King Geraint, usually presumed to be a historical king of Dumnonia, and is significant in showing that he was associated with Arthur at a relatively early date. It also provides the earliest known reference to Arthur as "emperor". Geraint, son of Erbin is found in the Black Book of Carmarthen, compiled around 1250, though the poem itself may date to the 10th or 11th century. Y Gododdin was similarly copied around the same time. The two poems differ in the relative archaic quality of their language, that of Y Gododdin being the older in form. However, this could merely reflect differences in the date of the last revision of the language within the two poems, as the language would have had to have been revised for the poems to remain comprehensible.

== Alternative candidates for the historical King Arthur ==
Some theories suggest that "Arthur" was a byname of attested historical individuals.

=== Lucius Artorius Castus and the Sarmatian connection ===
One theory suggests that Lucius Artorius Castus, a Roman military commander who served in Britain in the late 2nd century or early 3rd century, was a prototype of Arthur. Artorius is known from two inscriptions that give details about his service. After a long career as a centurion in the Roman army, he was promoted to prefect of Legio VI Victrix, a legion headquartered in Eboracum (present-day York, England). He later commanded two British legions on an expedition against either the Armoricans (in present-day Brittany) or the Armenians. He subsequently became civilian governor of Liburnia in modern Croatia, where he died.

Kemp Malone first made the connection between Artorius and King Arthur in 1924. Noting that the Welsh name Arthur plausibly derives from the Latin Artorius, Malone suggested that certain details of Castus' biography, in particular his possible campaign in Brittany and the fact that he was obliged to retire from the military (perhaps because of an injury), may have inspired elements of Geoffrey of Monmouth's depiction of King Arthur. Later scholars have challenged the idea, based on the fact that Artorius lived two to three centuries before the period typically associated with Arthur, and the fact that the parts of the inscriptions ostensibly similar to Arthur's story are open to interpretation.

Malone's idea attracted little attention for decades, but it was revived in the 1970s as part of a theory known as the "Sarmatian connection". In a 1975 essay, Helmut Nickel suggested that Artorius was the original Arthur, and that a group of Sarmatian cavalry serving under him in Britain inspired the Knights of the Round Table. Nickel wrote that Castus' Sarmatian unit fought under a red dragon banner and that their descendants were still in Britain in the 5th century; he also identified similarities between the Arthurian legend and traditions associated with the Sarmatians and other peoples of the Caucasus region. He suggested that the Sarmatians' descendants kept Castus' legacy alive over the centuries and mixed it with their ancestral myths involving magical cauldrons and swords.

Independently of Nickel, C. Scott Littleton developed a more elaborate version of the Sarmatian connection. Littleton first wrote about the theory with Anne C. Thomas in 1978, and expanded on it in a 1994 book co-authored by Linda Malcor, From Scythia to Camelot. Littleton and Malcor argued that Artorius and the Sarmatian cavalry were the inspiration for King Arthur and his knights, but that many elements of Arthur's story derive from Caucasian mythology, ostensibly brought to Britain in the 2nd century by Sarmatians and Alans. They find parallels for key features of the Arthurian legend, including the Sword in the Stone, the Holy Grail, and the return of Arthur's sword to a lake, in the traditions of the Caucasus, and connect Arthur and his knights to Batraz and his Narts, the heroes of the legends of the North Caucasus.

Some Arthurian scholars have given credence to the Sarmatian connection, but others have found it based on conjecture and weak evidence. Few of the Caucasian traditions cited to support the theory can be traced specifically with the Sarmatians; many are known only from orally transmitted tales that are not datable before they were first recorded in the 19th century. Additionally, many of the strongest parallels to the Arthurian legend are not found in the earliest Brittonic materials, but only appear in the later Continental romances of the 12th century or later. As such, the traditions would have had to survive in Britain for at least a thousand years between the arrival of the Sarmatians in the 2nd century and the Arthurian romances of the 12th century. Nonetheless, the Sarmatian connection continues to have popular appeal; it is the basis of the 2004 film King Arthur.

=== Riothamus ===
Riothamus (also spelled Riotimus) was a historical figure whom ancient sources list as "a king of the Britons". He lived in the late 5th century, and most of the stories about him were recorded in the Byzantine historian Jordanes' The Origin and Deeds of the Goths, written in the mid-6th century, only about 80 years after his presumed death.

About 460, the Roman diplomat and bishop Sidonius Apollinaris sent a letter to Riothamus asking his help to quell unrest among the Brettones, a colony of Brittonic-speaking people living in Armorica; this letter still survives. In the year 470, the Western Roman Emperor Anthemius was confronted with the Gothic revolt of Euric, king of the Visigoths who were campaigning outside their territory in Gaul. Anthemius requested help from Riothamus, and Jordanes writes that he crossed the ocean into Gaul with 12,000 soldiers into the land of the Bituriges, likely to Avaricum (Bourges). The location of Riothamus' army was betrayed to the Visigoths by Arvandus, the jealous praetorian prefect of Gaul, and Euric defeated him in the Battle of Déols. Riothamus was last seen retreating northwest to Burgundy.

Geoffrey Ashe points out that Arthur is said by Geoffrey of Monmouth to have crossed into Gaul twice, once to help a Roman emperor and once to subdue a civil war. Riothamus did both, assuming that he was a king in Britain as well as Armorica. Arthur is also said to have been betrayed by one of his advisers, and Riothamus was betrayed by one of his supposed allies. Finally, the Arthurian romances traditionally recount that King Arthur was carried off to Avalon (called insula Auallonis by Geoffrey of Monmouth, the first author to mention the legendary isle) before he died; Riothamus, after his defeat at Déols, was last known to have fled to the kingdom of the Germanic Burgundians, perhaps passing through a town called Avallon (which was within Burgundian territory and not far from Bourges).

It is unknown whether Riothamus was a king in Britain or Armorica. Armorica was a Brittonic colony and Jordanes writes that Riothamus "crossed the ocean", so it is possible that both are correct. The name Riothamus is interpreted by Ashe and some other scholars as a title meaning "High King", though there is no evidence for such a title being used by ancient Britons or Gauls, and the formation of the name (noun/adjective + superlative -tamo- suffix) follows a pattern found in numerous other Brittonic and Gaulish personal names. (Note: Examples include: Old Breton/Welsh Cunatam/Cunotami/Condam/Cyndaf (Brittonic *Cunotamos "Great Dog"), Old Welsh Caurdaf (Brittonic *Kawarotamos "Great Giant"), Old Welsh/Breton Eudaf/Outham (Brittonic *Awitamos "Great Will/Desire"), Uuoratam/Gwrdaf (Brittonic *Wortamos "Supreme"), Old Breton Rumatam (Brittonic *Roimmotamos "Great Band/Host"), Gwyndaf (Brittonic *Windotamos "Fairest/Whitest/Holiest One"), Breton Uuentamau (Brittonic *Wenitamaua "Friendliest", and *Windotamawā "Little Fairest/Whitest/Holiest (One)").) Cognates of the name Riothamus survive in Old Welsh (Riatav/Riadaf) and Old Breton (Riatam); all are derived from Common Brittonic *Rigotamos, meaning 'Most Kingly' or 'Kingliest'.

=== Ambrosius Aurelianus ===
According to Gildas, Ambrosius Aurelianus (also sometimes referred to as Aurelius Ambrosius) was a powerful Romano-British leader in Britain. He was renowned for his campaigns against the Saxons, and there is some speculation that he may have commanded the British forces at the Battle of Badon Hill or that the battle was a continuation of his efforts.

Scholars such as Léon Fleuriot identified Ambrosius Aurelianus with the aforementioned Riothamus figure from Jordanes, an idea which forms part of Fleuriot's hypothesis about the origins of the Arthurian legend. Others, such as Geoffrey Ashe, disagree, since Ambrosius is not called "king" until the somewhat-legendary Historia Brittonum.

=== Artuir mac Áedán ===
Artuir mac Áedán was the eldest son of Áedán mac Gabráin, an Irish king of Dál Riata (in present-day south-west Scotland) in the late 6th century. Artuir never himself became king of Dál Riata; his brother Eochaid Buide ruled after their father's death. However, Artuir became a war leader when Áedán gave up his role and retired to monastic life, though Áedán was officially still king. Thus it was Artuir who led the Scoti of Dál Riata in a war against the Picts, separate from the later war with Northumbria.

That Artuir is the historical basis of the mythical King Arthur has been proposed by both David F. Carroll and Michael Wood. Under this hypothesis, Artuir was predominantly active in the region between Hadrian's Wall and the Antonine Wall, the kingdom of the Gododdin. However, he was ultimately killed in battle in 596 – thus, he lived far too late to have been the victor at the Battle of Badon, as mentioned by Gildas in the early 6th century.

== See also ==
- King Arthur's messianic return
- Sites and places associated with Arthurian legend

== Notes ==
^α For example, Artúr mac Conaing, who may have been named after his uncle Artúr mac Áedáin. Artúr son of Bicoir "the Briton" was another reported in this period, who slew Mongán mac Fiachnai of Ulster in 620/625 in Kintyre. A man named Feradach, apparently the grandson of one Artuir, was a signatory at the synod that enacted the Law of Adomnan in 697. Arthur ap Pedr was a prince in Dyfed, born around 570–580.
