= 470 =

470 in various calendars
- Gregorian calendar: 470; CDLXX
- Ab urbe condita: 1223
- Assyrian calendar: 5220
- Balinese saka calendar: 391–392
- Bengali calendar: −124 – −123
- Berber calendar: 1420
- Buddhist calendar: 1014
- Burmese calendar: −168
- Byzantine calendar: 5978–5979
- Chinese calendar: 己酉年 (Earth Rooster); 3167 or 2960 — to — 庚戌年 (Metal Dog); 3168 or 2961
- Coptic calendar: 186–187
- Discordian calendar: 1636
- Ethiopian calendar: 462–463
- Hebrew calendar: 4230–4231
- Hindu calendars
- Vikram Samvat: 526–527
- Shaka Samvat: 391–392
- Kali Yuga: 3570–3571
- Holocene calendar: 10470
- Iranian calendar: 152 BP – 151 BP
- Islamic calendar: 157 BH – 156 BH
- Javanese calendar: 355–356
- Julian calendar: 470; CDLXX
- Korean calendar: 2803
- Minguo calendar: 1442 before ROC 民前1442年
- Nanakshahi calendar: −998
- Seleucid era: 781/782 AG
- Thai solar calendar: 1012–1013
- Tibetan calendar: ས་མོ་བྱ་ལོ་ (female Earth-Bird); 596 or 215 or −557 — to — ལྕགས་ཕོ་ཁྱི་ལོ་ (male Iron-Dog); 597 or 216 or −556

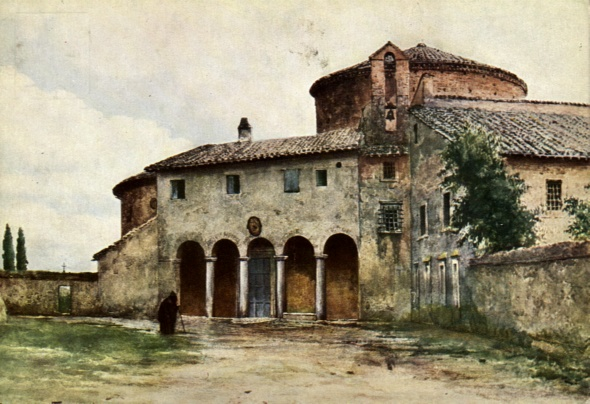
Santo Stefano Rotondo, by Roesler Franz

Year 470 (CDLXX) was a common year starting on Thursday of the Julian calendar. At the time, it was known as the Year of the Consulship of Severus and Iordanes (or, less frequently, year 1223 Ab urbe condita). The denomination 470 for this year has been used since the early medieval period, when the Anno Domini calendar era became the prevalent method in Europe for naming years.

== Events ==
=== By place ===
==== Roman Empire ====
- Revolt of Euric: Roman forces under Paulus and Childeric I stop the Aquitanian Goths at Bourges and briefly recaptured Tours in 470. All the loot they had stolen fell into the hands of Paul.
- The Roman general Paulus is killed shortly afterwards at Angers.
- The church of Santo Stefano Rotondo at Rome is consecrated (approximate date).

==== Europe ====
- Odoacer becomes the leader of the Germanic tribes (Herulic – Scirian foederati) in Northern Italy (approximate date).

=== By topic ===
==== Religion ====
- Mamertus, bishop of Vienne, introduces the Rogation days (a three days' procession involving prayer to invoke God's mercy).

== Births ==
- Buddhapālita, Indian Madhyamaka scholar (d. 550)
- Caesarius, bishop of Arles (or 469; d. 542)
- Dionysius Exiguus, inventor of the Anno Domini era (approximate date)
- Endelienta, Welsh princess and saint (approximate date)
- Ferreolus of Rodez, Roman senator (approximate date)
- Finnian of Clonard, Irish monastic saint (d. 549)
- approximate date – Pope John I

== Deaths ==
- K'inich Popol Hol, king of the Maya city of Copán
- Romanus, Roman usurper in the West Roman Empire (executed)
