= Battle of Angers =

Battle in 469 in the Western Roman Empire

- Part of Gothic revolt of Euric
Date	469
Location	Angers
Result	Roman victory

Belligerents
Gallo-Romans; Franks	Saxons; Aquitanian Goths

Commanders and leaders
Paulus †; Childeric	Adovacrius

The Battle of Angers was a military conflict in or around the city of Angers during the last phase of the Western Roman Empire. The event is known mainly from the work of Gregory of Tours and took place against the background of the power struggle between Emperor Anthemius of Rome and Euric, king of the Aquitanian Goths. Gregory describes the presence of Saxon troops led by Adovacrius in the Loire region, the involvement of Paulus and Childeric I, and the death of Paulus during the fighting. The brevity of the report and the unclear chronology have led to different interpretations by modern historians.

== Introduction ==
The events surrounding Angers in 469 are among the least understood, but possibly most significant episodes from the last decades of the Western Roman Empire. In the 460s, the Western Roman Empire was undergoing political and military disintegration. In Gaul, Roman authority was challenged by various regional power blocs, including the Goths, Franks, Saxons, local Gallo-Roman elites, and Warlords.

After his accession to the throne in 467, Emperor Anthemius tried to restore Roman authority in Gaul. However, the beginning of his emperorhood was disastrous. The war against the Vandals ended in a defeat because the joint Roman fleet was devastatingly defeated at Cape Bon. The consequences of this were enormous: in addition to the loss of ships and manpower, this cost the empire its last financial reserves. Nevertheless, Anthemius did not give up on his recovery plans. As Euric became increasingly aggressive, the emperor tried to organize a broad coalition of Roman, British, and possibly Suevian forces against Euric. Euric was aware of this development thanks to his contacts within the Gallo-Roman elite and opted for a preventive strategy. (Note: The Arvandus case shows that Euric received information from the highest Roman circles. He did not operate blindly but probably knew parts of Roman diplomatic and military planning.)

The correspondence of Sidonius Apollinaris shows that the former prefect of Gaul Arvandus was in contact with the Gothic king. According to Sidonius, Arvandus advised Euric not to make peace with the emperor and attack the British north of the Loire. The Saxon activities in the Loire region and Euric's subsequent victory over Riothamus have led to speculation about possible connections between these events. However, there is no explicit evidence for Euric's direct involvement in the Saxon operations.

== Course of the war ==
According to Gregory of Tours, Count Paul led the Romans and Franks against the Goths and took loot. This fact suggests that he operated as general at the head of a Roman army supplemented with contingents of Franks. He carried out a successful campaign in the area under Gothic influence, somewhere in Central or Northern Gaul. In the same text, Gregory mentions that Saxons led by Adovacrius took control of the Angers area.

Most historians assume that Paul died during the subsequent fighting at Angers. Soon after, Childeric I arrived and captured the city, "Paul being dead". Historians assume that Childeric was on the side of the Romans and had previously supported Aegidius.

== Relation to Riothamus's campaign ==
An important historiographical issue concerns the relationship between the events near Angers and the campaign of Riothamus against the Visigoths. Gregory of Tours mentions the defeat of Riothamus against Euric at Déols in the same passage in which he describes the events around Angers. Because his report does not follow a strict chronological structure, there is no consensus on the order of events. Some historians believe that Riothamus's defeat preceded Paulus's death. Other researchers believe that the crisis around Angers may have occurred earlier and contributed to the failure of the anti-Gothic coalition. The city of Angers was also strategically located on the Loire, near the routes from Armorica to Bourges. In short, between the various power centers in North Gaul.

Jordanes reports a century later that Riothamus was defeated before support could reach him. If the events surrounding Angers and the campaign against Riothamus took place in the same period of time, then the Saxon war in the Loire region may have prevented the merger of Childeric's army and that of Riothamus. It is possible that Paul's death was crucial in this context, because Gregory does not explicitly say anywhere that Childeric participated in Riothamus' campaign. This presentation could help explain why Riothamus was defeated by Euric: a lack of effective support.

== See also ==
- Gregory of Tours, Decem Libri Historiarum
- Jordanes, Getica
- Sidonius Apollinaris, Epistulae

== Bibliography ==
Gregory of Tours (1951). "18". In Krusch, Bruno; Levison, Wilhelm (eds.). Decem Libri Historiarum (in Latin). Vol. 2. Hannover: Hahn.

- Jones, Arnold Hugh Martin; Martindale, J. R.; Morris, J. (1971). The Prosopography of the Later Roman Empire: Volume 2, AD 395-527. Cambridge University Press. ISBN 978-0-521-20159-9.
- Wijnendaele, Jeroen W.P. (2024). De wereld van Clovis, de val van Rome en de geboorte van het westen [The World of Clovis, the Fall of Rome and the Birth of the West] (in Dutch). Ertsberg. ISBN 9789464984064.
