= Avallon =

- Subprefecture and commune
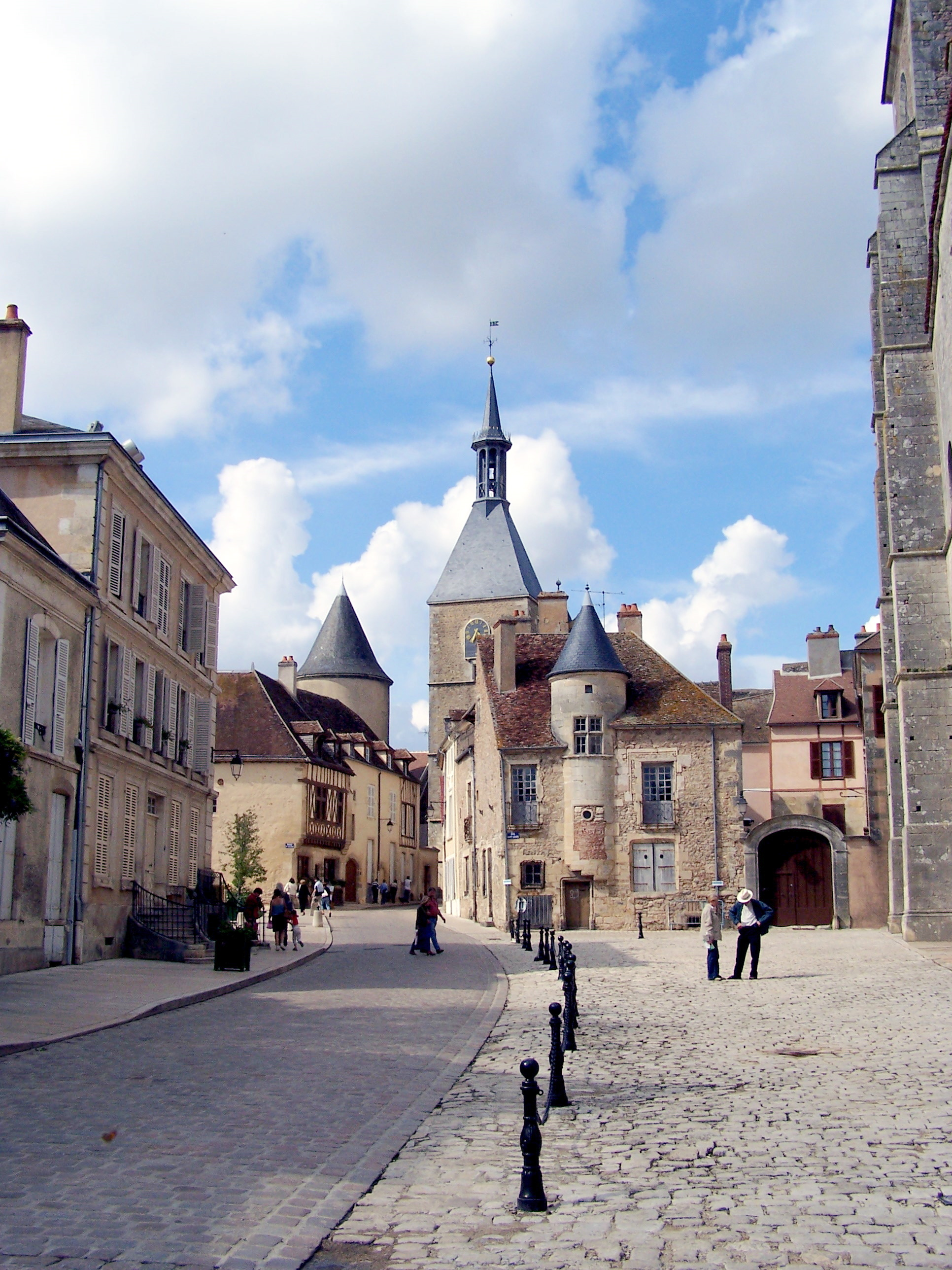
- The clock tower and Saint-Lazare square in Avallon

- Coat of arms
- Location of Avallon
- Location within France Location within Bourgogne-Franche-Comté
- Coordinates: 47°29′27″N 3°54′33″E
- Country: France
- Region: Bourgogne-Franche-Comté
- Department: Yonne
- Arrondissement: Avallon
- Canton: Avallon
- Intercommunality: CC Avallon - Vézelay - Morvan

Government
  - Mayor (2021–2026): Jamilah Habsaoui
- Area^{1}: 26.75 km^{2} (10.33 sq mi)
- Elevation: 254 m (833 ft)
- Highest elevation: 369 m (1,211 ft)
- Lowest elevation: 163 m (535 ft)
- Population (2023): 6,305
  - Density: 235.7/km^{2} (610.5/sq mi)
- Time zone: UTC+01:00 (CET)
  - Summer (DST): UTC+02:00 (CEST)
- INSEE/Postal code: 89025 /89200
- ^{1} French Land Register data, which excludes lakes, ponds, glaciers > 1 km^{2} (0.386 sq mi or 247 acres) and river estuaries.

Avallon (French pronunciation: [avalɔ̃]) is a commune in the Burgundian department of Yonne, in France.

== Name ==
Avallon, Latin Aballō, ablative Aballone, is ultimately derived from Gaulish *Aballū, oblique *Aballon- meaning "Apple-tree (place)" or "(place of the) "Apple Tree Goddess" (from Proto-Celtic *abalnā, cf. Old Irish aball, Welsh afall, Old Breton aball(en), "apple tree").

== Geography ==
Avallon is located 50 km south-southeast of Auxerre, served by a branch of the Paris–Lyon railway and by exit 22 of the A6 motorway. The old town, with many winding cobblestone streets flanked by traditional stone and woodwork buildings, is situated on a flat promontory, the base of which is washed on the south by the river Cousin, on the east and west by small streams.

== History ==
Chance finds of coins and pottery fragments and a fine head of Minerva are reminders of the Roman settlement carrying the Celtic name Aballo, a mutatio or post where fresh horses could be obtained. Two pink marble columns in the church of St-Martin du Bourg have been reused from an unknown temple (Princeton Encyclopedia). The Roman citadel, on a rocky spur overlooking the Cousin valley, has been Christianized as Montmarte ("Mount of the Martyrs").

In the Middle Ages Avallon (Aballo) was the seat of a viscounty dependent on the duchy of Burgundy; on the death of Charles the Bold in 1477, it passed under the royal authority. The castle, mentioned as early as the seventh century, has utterly disappeared.

=== King Arthur and the French Avallon theory ===
A theory exists which proposes that the Isle of Avalon mentioned in Arthurian legend is, in fact, Avallon in Burgundy.

Geoffrey Ashe first mentioned the French Avallon theory in his 1985 book, The Discovery of King Arthur. His theory is that "King Arthur" is based on the historical Romano-British supreme king Riothamus, who reigned between 454–470, and whose life and campaigns have parallels to the accounts of "King Arthur" in the first medieval accounts of King Arthur by Geoffrey of Monmouth (Historia Regum Britanniae, c. 1136). According to Ashe, in the year 470, Riothamus disappeared (and presumably died) in the neighborhood of Avallon after being defeated in the battle of Déols by Euric king of the Visigoths, whom the Western Roman Emperor Anthemius had hired Riothamus to fight against. This, and other aspects of his reign, made Ashe propose him as a candidate for the historical King Arthur, with Avallon becoming the Arthurian Avalon. No ancient source mentioning Riothamus places him anywhere near Avallon and Geoffrey of Monmouth, who is the first to mention "the isle of Avalon" (Latin insula Auallonis) and based his description of the isle on Classical descriptions of the Fortunate Isles, is explicit that it was an island in the western seas.

== Population ==
Historical population
Year	Pop.	±% p.a.
1968	6,846	—
1975	8,814	+3.68%
1982	8,904	+0.15%
1990	8,617	−0.41%
1999	8,217	−0.53%
2007	7,366	−1.36%
2012	7,210	−0.43%
2017	6,572	−1.84%
2023	6,305	−0.69%
Source: INSEE

== Sights ==
Its chief building, the formerly collegiate church of Saint-Lazare, dates from the twelfth century, on an earlier foundation dedicated to Notre Dame. Vestiges of the earlier church were revealed beneath the high altar in an excavation of 1861. The acquisition of a relic of Saint Lazare prompted its rededication: Saint Ladre is attested in the fourteenth century. It was the seat of an archdeaconate answering to the bishop of Autun. The two western portals are densely adorned with sculpture in the Romanesque style; the tower on the left of the facade was rebuilt in the seventeenth century. The Tour de l'Horloge, pierced by a gateway through which passes the Grande Rue, is an eleventh-century structure containing a museum on its second floor. Remains of the ancient fortifications, including seven of the flanking towers, are still to be seen. Avallon has a statue of Vauban, the military engineer of Louis XIV.

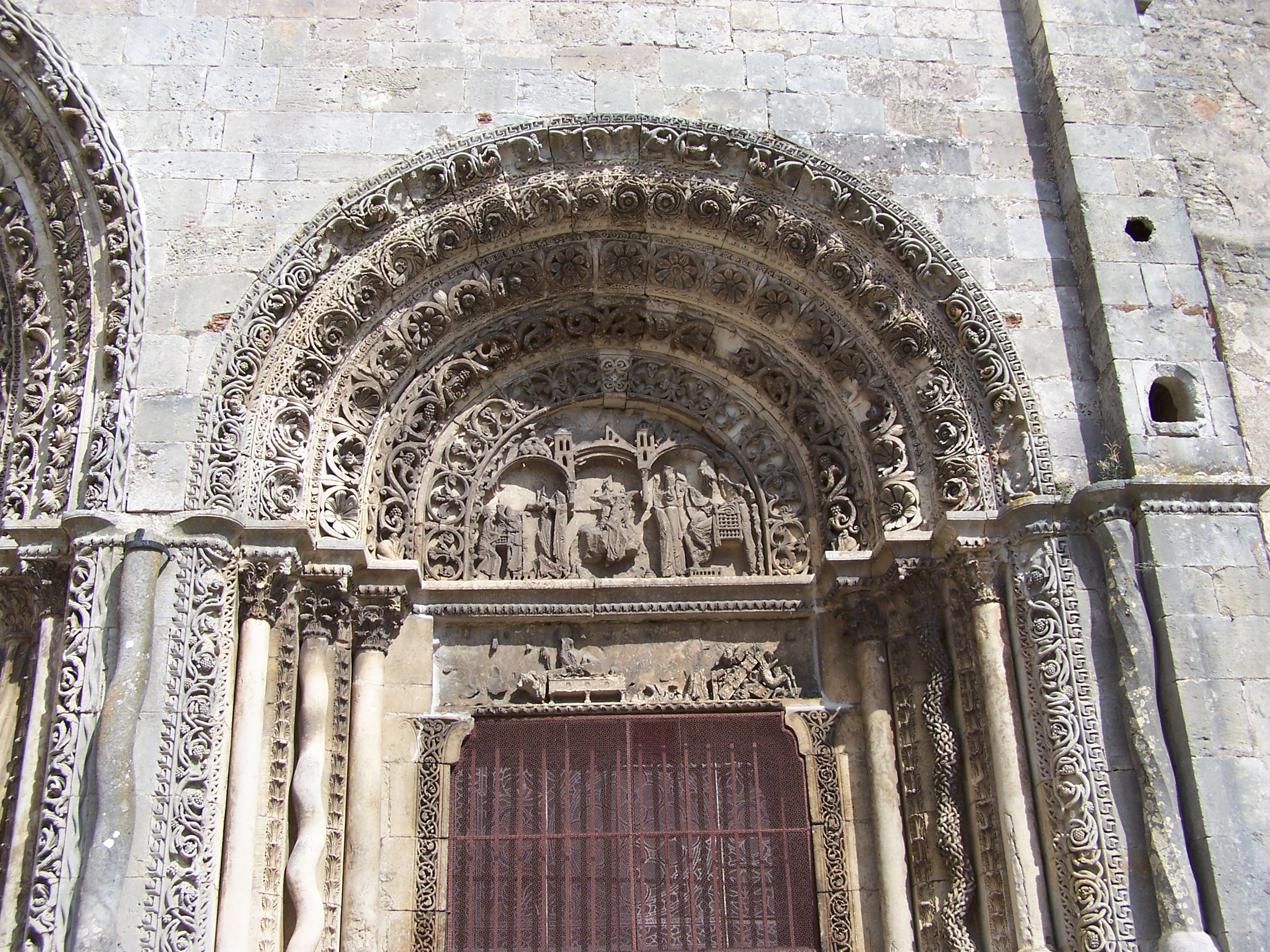
Smaller door of St Lazarus of Avallon (12th century).

== Economy ==
As of the early 20th century, the manufacture of biscuits and gingerbread, and the leather and farm implements supported the economy in Avallon, and there was considerable traffic on wood, wine, and the live-stock and agricultural produce in the surrounding country.

== Miscellaneous ==
As of the early 20th century, the public institutions included the subprefecture, a tribunal of first instance, and a départemental college.

=== Twin towns ===
Avallon is twinned with:

- Pepinster, Belgium
- Cochem, Germany
- Tenterden, United Kingdom
- Saku, Japan

== Climate ==
Climate data for Avallon (1988–2010 normals, extremes 1988–2013)
Month	Jan	Feb	Mar	Apr	May	Jun	Jul	Aug	Sep	Oct	Nov	Dec	Year
Record high °C (°F)	17.0 (62.6)	21.9 (71.4)	24.5 (76.1)	29.9 (85.8)	31.6 (88.9)	38.5 (101.3)	39.0 (102.2)	42.1 (107.8)	34.4 (93.9)	28.4 (83.1)	22.5 (72.5)	21.4 (70.5)	42.1 (107.8)
Mean daily maximum °C (°F)	6.5 (43.7)	8.5 (47.3)	12.6 (54.7)	15.6 (60.1)	20.4 (68.7)	23.5 (74.3)	26.0 (78.8)	26.1 (79.0)	21.2 (70.2)	16.6 (61.9)	10.1 (50.2)	6.6 (43.9)	16.2 (61.2)
Daily mean °C (°F)	3.6 (38.5)	4.7 (40.5)	7.8 (46.0)	10.3 (50.5)	14.8 (58.6)	17.7 (63.9)	20.1 (68.2)	20.0 (68.0)	15.8 (60.4)	12.2 (54.0)	6.9 (44.4)	4.0 (39.2)	11.5 (52.7)
Mean daily minimum °C (°F)	0.7 (33.3)	0.9 (33.6)	3.0 (37.4)	5.0 (41.0)	9.2 (48.6)	12.0 (53.6)	14.1 (57.4)	13.9 (57.0)	10.3 (50.5)	7.9 (46.2)	3.6 (38.5)	1.3 (34.3)	6.9 (44.4)
Record low °C (°F)	−13.7 (7.3)	−13.7 (7.3)	−14.5 (5.9)	−4.4 (24.1)	−0.7 (30.7)	2.5 (36.5)	6.9 (44.4)	4.2 (39.6)	1.1 (34.0)	−6.0 (21.2)	−10.4 (13.3)	−13.6 (7.5)	−14.5 (5.9)
Average precipitation mm (inches)	61.8 (2.43)	55.5 (2.19)	55.8 (2.20)	73.3 (2.89)	71.7 (2.82)	70.9 (2.79)	68.6 (2.70)	63.3 (2.49)	68.0 (2.68)	72.6 (2.86)	75.2 (2.96)	70.0 (2.76)	806.7 (31.76)
Average precipitation days (≥ 1.0 mm)	11.6	11.2	10.7	11.2	10.9	9.9	9.0	9.0	9.7	11.5	13.1	12.9	130.6
Source: Meteociel

== See also ==
- Communes of the Yonne department
- Parc naturel régional du Morvan
