= El Karyun =

Village in Beheira Governorate, Egypt

El Karyun الكريون
- Location in Egypt
- Coordinates: 31°8′6.75″N 30°11′36.67″E
- Country: Egypt
- Governorate: Beheira

Population (2006)
  - Total: 14,723
- Time zone: UTC+2 (EET)
  - Summer (DST): UTC+3 (EEST)

El Karyun (Arabic: الكريون) is a village in the Beheira Governorate of Egypt.

Known in Late Antiquity as Khaireon (Ancient Greek: Χαιρέον) or Khaireou (Ancient Greek: Χαιρέου, Coptic: ⲭⲉⲣⲉⲩ, Latin: Chaereu), it was an important town and a port on the Canopic branch of the Nile (modern Kanoubiya canal) and a starting point of a canal connecting it to Alexandria.

== Etymology ==
The exact etymology of the village's name is unknown. Possible explanations include derivation from an unattested Greek name Khairios (Ancient Greek: *Χαιριος) or Ancient Egyptian toponym khrouou.

== History ==
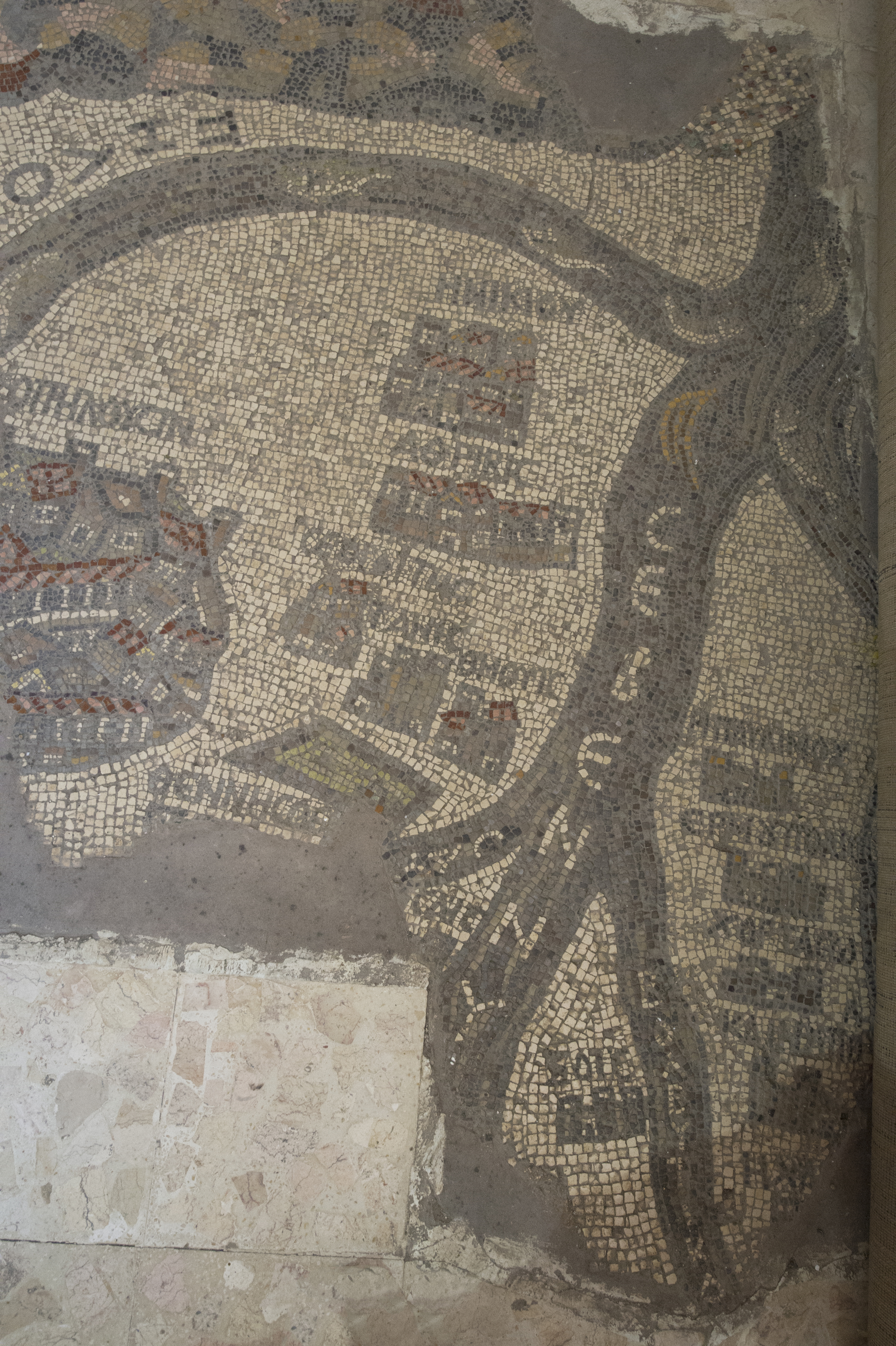
Chaireon on the Madaba Map (bottom right)

The town was probably founded during the reign of the 30th dynasty as a customs port on the Nile under the name Henit. A marble Nilometer was found at the site of the village.

The Chronicle of John of Nikiu mentions the town and it's canal built by Cleopatra. Theophanes states that the canal was dug in 459. Emperor Leo I expanded the town and Justinian I expanded the canal.

In the turmoil of 7th century general Bonosus retreated to Khaireon (mentioned by John of Nikiu under the name Demqaruni, a combination of Coptic words for "town" (Coptic: ϯⲙⲓ) and town's name).

During the Arab conquest of Egypt the commander of Khaireon, Theodore, retreated to Alexandria and surrendered the city without a fight.

Ibn Hawqal in the 10th century describes Karyun as a flourishing town that was probably a centre of a kura and a bishopric.
