= 459th =

459th may refer to:

- 459th Air Refueling Wing, US Air Force Reserve Command unit based at Joint Base Andrews Naval Air Facility since 1954
- 459th Airlift Squadron (459 AS), part of the 374th Airlift Wing at Yokota Air Base, Japan

== See also ==
- 459 (number)
- 459, the year 459 (CDLIX) of the Julian calendar
- 459 BC
