= 471 =

471 in various calendars
- Gregorian calendar: 471; CDLXXI
- Ab urbe condita: 1224
- Assyrian calendar: 5221
- Balinese saka calendar: 392–393
- Bengali calendar: −123 – −122
- Berber calendar: 1421
- Buddhist calendar: 1015
- Burmese calendar: −167
- Byzantine calendar: 5979–5980
- Chinese calendar: 庚戌年 (Metal Dog); 3168 or 2961 — to — 辛亥年 (Metal Pig); 3169 or 2962
- Coptic calendar: 187–188
- Discordian calendar: 1637
- Ethiopian calendar: 463–464
- Hebrew calendar: 4231–4232
- Hindu calendars
- Vikram Samvat: 527–528
- Shaka Samvat: 392–393
- Kali Yuga: 3571–3572
- Holocene calendar: 10471
- Iranian calendar: 151 BP – 150 BP
- Islamic calendar: 156 BH – 155 BH
- Javanese calendar: 356–357
- Julian calendar: 471; CDLXXI
- Korean calendar: 2804
- Minguo calendar: 1441 before ROC 民前1441年
- Nanakshahi calendar: −997
- Seleucid era: 782/783 AG
- Thai solar calendar: 1013–1014
- Tibetan calendar: ལྕགས་ཕོ་ཁྱི་ལོ་ (male Iron-Dog); 597 or 216 or −556 — to — ལྕགས་མོ་ཕག་ལོ་ (female Iron-Boar); 598 or 217 or −555

Year 471 (CDLXXI) was a common year starting on Friday of the Julian calendar. At the time, it was known in the Roman Empire as the Year of the Consulship of Novus and Probianus (or, less frequently, year 1224 Ab urbe condita). The denomination 471 for this year has been used since the early medieval period, when the Anno Domini calendar era became the prevalent method in Europe for naming years.

== Events ==
=== By place ===
==== Roman Empire ====
- Basiliscus, brother-in-law of Emperor Leo I, returns from exile (see 468) and leads an imperial conspiracy against Aspar (magister militum), helping in his murder at Constantinople.

==== Britannia ====
- The army of King Ceretic of Strathclyde raids the Irish coast, carries off some of Saint Patrick's followers, and sells them into slavery (approximate date).

==== Europe ====
- Revolt of Euric: The Aquitanian Goths under Euric defeat a Roman army that was sent by Emperor Anthemius near Arles and conquer a large part of the Provence (Southern Gaul). The city of Clermont-Ferrand in Auvergne is besieged.
- The Goths, led by Theodoric Strabo, revolt in Thrace after the assassination of Aspar. Leo I sends Basiliscus to suppress the uprising.
- Theodoric the Great, age 17, succeeds his father Theodemir as king of the Ostrogoths, settling his people in lower Moesia (Balkans).

==== Asia ====
- Northern Wei ruler Xianwen officially goes into retirement. His son, Xiao Wen Di, aged 4, becomes the new emperor, initially under the regency of Emperor Xianwen's stepmother Empress Dowager Feng.

=== By topic ===
==== Religion ====
- Acacius becomes patriarch of Constantinople, succeeding Gennadius I.

== Deaths ==
- August 25 – Gennadius I, patriarch of Constantinople
- Ardabur, Roman general and son of Aspar
- Aspar, Alan patrician and general (magister militum)
- Eudocia, Vandal queen and daughter of Valentinian III (approximate date)
- Julius Patricius, Roman general and son of Aspar (approximate date)
