= Adovacrius =

Saxon leader

Adovacrius led a group of Saxons to attack Angers in the 5th century. He is mentioned by the 6th-century historian Gregory of Tours, and he is sometimes considered to be the same person as Odoacer who became king of Italy some years later, and apparently appears in the same passage.

== Evidence ==
Gregory of Tours refers to Adovacrius in a passage which seems to be made up of quotes about conflicts in the Loire region from a chronicle and is considered by modern scholars to be "only loosely connected to together, and ambiguous in terms of chronology and cause and effect".

The first part mentions a battle in Orleans. This is generally equated to the Battle of Orléans (463), which other sources (Hydatius, Marius of Avranches, and the Gallic Chronicle of 511) all report as a battle where Frederic, the brother of the Visigothic king Theoderic II, was killed fighting Aegidius and the Franks. It then mentions the death of Aegidius which is known from other sources to have happened about 465.

II.18. Igitur Childericus Aurilianis pugnas egit,	Now Childeric fought battles at Orleans,
Adovacrius vero cum Saxonibus Andecavo venit.	while Adovacrius came with the Saxons to Angers.
Magna tunc lues populum devastavit.	At that time a great plague devastated the people.
Mortuus est autem Egidius et reliquit filium Syagrium nomine.	Aegidius died and left a son named Syagrius.

This is continued with a series of events which are normally dated to the period around 469 during the Gothic revolt of Euric, when the Visigoths attempted to expand their territory into northern Gaul, after the emperor Anthemius called upon a force from Britain led by Riothamus to help.

Quo defuncto, Adovacrius [variant: Adovagrius] de Andecavo vel aliis locis obsedes accepit.	After his [Aegidius'] death, Adovacrius received hostages from Angers and from other places.
Brittani de Bituricas a Gothis expulsi sunt, multis apud Dolensim vicum peremptis.	The Britons were driven out of the territory of the Bituriges [around Bourges] by the Goths, many having been killed near the village of Déols.
Paulos vero comes cum Romanis ac Francis Gothis bella intulit et praedas egit.	Count Paul, meanwhile, together with Romans and Franks, made war on the Goths and took booty.
Veniente vero Adovacrio [variant: Odovacrio] Andecavus, Childericus rex sequenti die advenit	When Adovacrius came to Angers, King Childeric arrived on the following day;
interemptoque Paulo comite, civitatem obtinuit.	Count Paul having been killed, he [Childeric] took possession of the city.
Magnum ea die incendio domus aeclesiae concremata est.	On that day a great church building was burned down by fire.
II.19. His ita gestis, inter Saxones atque Romanos bellum gestum est;	After these events, war was waged between the Saxons and the Romans.
sed Saxones terga vertentes, multos de suis, Romanis insequentibus, gladio reliquerunt;	But the Saxons turned their backs in flight, and, as the Romans pursued them, left many of their own men behind to the sword.
insolae eorum cum multo populo interempto a Francis captae atque subversi sunt.	Their islands were captured by the Franks and destroyed, with a large number of people killed.
Eo anno minse nono terra tremuit.	In that year, in the ninth month, the earth trembled.
Odovacrius [variants: Odovacrus, Adovachrius] cum Childerico foedus iniit, Alamannusque, qui partem Italiae pervaserant, subiugarunt.	Odovacrius entered into an alliance with Childeric, and they subdued the Alamanni, who had overrun part of Italy.

== Interpretation ==
According to the PLRE interpretation Adovacrius and Odovacrius in this text are both the same person as Odoacer who "may have gone to Gaul to seek his fortune after the death of Attila and the break-up of the Hun empire" and he "apparently became leader of a group of Saxons in Gaul".

In 1946, Reynolds and Lopez interpreted the passage as showing that Gregory must "have had reason to fuse" the Saxon leader and the later King of Italy, and they argued that this was likely to be correct. Odoacer the king of Italy grew up among the allies of Attila, and the period of the battles on the Loire was between the Battle of the Catalaunian Plains in 451, when the Huns and their allies were defeated by their former ally Aëtius in Gaul, and the 470s when Odoacer took up service in the Roman military in Italy.

In 1986 Krautschick noted that Gregory of Tours never says that this Adovacrius was himself a Saxon. Furthermore he felt that his name was not common enough to make it likely that there were two at the same time. He proposed that in 463 Odoacar would have been old enough to lead a warband, and if he had fought for Attila on the Catalaunian Plains in 451, he may have made his way from there to the Saxons. Alternatively, as the son of a high-ranking Hunnic dignitary, he could have begun working with the Saxons as part of a commission under Attila, who lived until 453.

In 1988 James noted that many scholars assumed that the Alamanni mentioned in this passage must in fact be Alans, who had a settlement in the Loire region, "on the grounds that Childeric could hardly have been fighting in Italy". However, as most scholars presumed Adovacrius and Odovacrius to be the same person, and the second one is "almost certainly" the ruler of Italy, he argued that the passage shows that Childeric was playing a political role within what was left of the Roman empire.

In 2003 argued that in "virtually all the manuscripts the name in chapter 18 is Adovacrius (or Adovagrius) and in chapter 19 Odovacrius" saying it is "interesting" that he divided the material into two chapters, and arguing that while II.18 and II.19 were linked by Gregory, this is only "because they referred to conflicts in the same region, and because both mentioned Childeric".

In 2004 Matthias Springer noted that Odoacer the future king of Italy is often understood to have had an ancestral connection to the early Thuringians, and these in turn were not yet clearly distinguished from the Saxons to their north. He believed that this could explain the connection between the young Odoacer and a group of Saxons.

In 2007 Halsall wrote that many scholars "almost certainly incorrectly" equate Adovacrius and Odoacer. He noted that these Saxons may have come from Britain, and may have been working with the Goths who were also mentioned in the same passage. Concerning their island bases he notes that "whether these are in the Loire, such as were used by the Vikings later on, or off the coast of Gaul is also unclear".

== Sources ==
- David Frye: Aegidius, Childeric, Odovacer and Paul. In: Nottingham Medieval Studies. 36, 1992, ISSN 0078-2122, S. 1–14.
- Halsall, Guy (2007), Barbarian Migrations and the Roman West, 376–568, Cambridge University Press
- James, Edward (1988). The Franks. The Peoples of Europe. Oxford, UK; Cambridge, Massachusetts: Basil Blackwell. ISBN 0-631-17936-4.
- Krautschick, Stefan (1986), "Zwei Aspekte des Jahres 476", Historia: Zeitschrift für Alte Geschichte, 35 (3): 344–371, JSTOR 4435971
- Martindale, John R., ed. (1980). The Prosopography of the Later Roman Empire: Volume II, AD 395–527. Cambridge: Cambridge University Press. ISBN 0-521-20159-4.
- MacGeorge, Penny (2003). Late Roman Warlords. Oxford: Oxford University Press. ISBN 0199252440.
- Reynolds, Robert L.; Lopez, Robert S. (1946). "Odoacer: German or Hun?". The American Historical Review. 52 (1): 36–53. doi:10.1086/ahr/52.1.36. JSTOR 1845067.
- Springer, Matthias (2004). Die Sachsen (in German). Kohlhammer Verlag. ISBN 978-3-17-023227-3.
