= 550 =

Calendar year

550 in various calendars
Gregorian calendar	550; DL
Ab urbe condita	1303
Assyrian calendar	5300
Balinese saka calendar	471–472
Bengali calendar	−44 – −43
Berber calendar	1500
Buddhist calendar	1094
Burmese calendar	−88
Byzantine calendar	6058–6059
Chinese calendar	己巳年 (Earth Snake); 3247 or 3040 — to — 庚午年 (Metal Horse); 3248 or 3041
Coptic calendar	266–267
Discordian calendar	1716
Ethiopian calendar	542–543
Hebrew calendar	4310–4311
- Hindu calendars
Vikram Samvat	606–607
Shaka Samvat	471–472
Kali Yuga	3650–3651
Holocene calendar	10550
Iranian calendar	72 BP – 71 BP
Islamic calendar	74 BH – 73 BH
Javanese calendar	438–439
Julian calendar	550; DL
Korean calendar	2883
Minguo calendar	1362 before ROC 民前1362年
Nanakshahi calendar	−918
Seleucid era	861/862 AG
Thai solar calendar	1092–1093
Tibetan calendar	ས་མོ་སྦྲུལ་ལོ་ (female Earth-Snake); 676 or 295 or −477 — to — ལྕགས་ཕོ་རྟ་ལོ་ (male Iron-Horse); 677 or 296 or −476

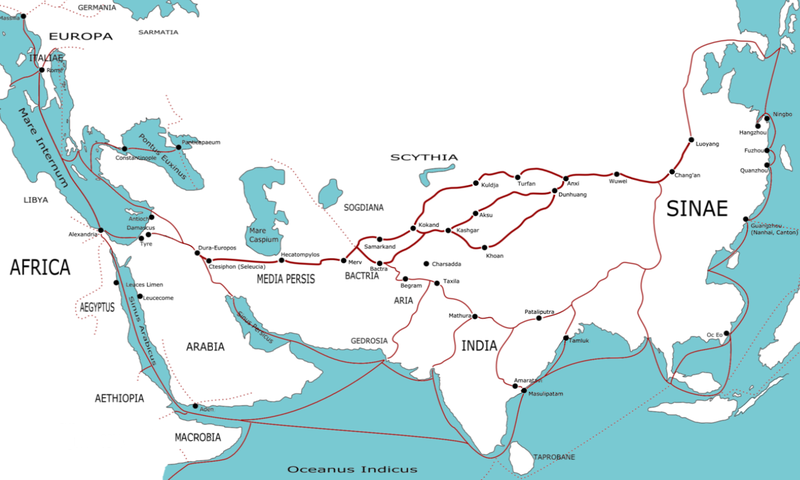
The Silk Roads between 500 BC and 500 AD

Year 550 (DL) was a common year starting on Saturday of the Julian calendar. The denomination 550 for this year has been used since the early medieval period, when the Anno Domini calendar era became the prevalent method in Europe for naming years.

== Events ==
=== By place ===
==== Byzantine Empire ====
- Emperor Justinian I appoints Bessas commander (magister militum) of Armenia, and entrusts him with the war in Lazica (Georgia).
  - Siege of Petra (550–551)
- January 16 – Gothic War: The Ostrogoths under king Totila recapture Rome after a long siege, by bribing the Isaurian garrison.
- Summer – Totila plunders Sicily, after he subdues Corsica and Sardinia. He sends a Gothic fleet to raid the coasts of Greece.
- Justinian I sends two Nestorian monks on a mission to Central Asia, to spread Christianity in the East (approximate date).

==== Europe ====
- The Vendel era begins; the name is given to a region in Uppland (an important area of the sagas' account of a Swedish kingdom).

==== Persia ====
- The Sassanid Empire, under the reign of King Khosrow I, controls the trade of silk destined for Europe and the Byzantine Empire.

==== Asia ====
- The Eastern Wei Dynasty ends, and Wen Xuan Di becomes emperor of Northern Qi. He forces Xiao Jing Di to yield the throne.
- Wen Xuan Di adopts a defensive policy towards the hostile northern tribes; he builds over 1,000 miles of walls on the border.
- The Gupta Empire falls; India is again ruled by regional kingdoms (approximate date).

==== Americas ====
- Construction of Quiriguá (Guatemala) begins (approximate date).
- The last known eruption of Chimborazo (modern Ecuador) occurs.

=== By topic ===
==== Arts and sciences ====
- Hindu mathematicians give zero a numeral representation in a positional notation system.
- Procopius writes the Secret History (approximate date).

==== Religion ====
- The churches of Lazica (Georgia) and Armenia split. While the Armenian Church remains independent, the Georgian church unites with the Byzantine Empire. This ecclesiastical union deepens political and cultural contact between the two states. As a sign of Lazica's status vis-à-vis Byzantium, Lazic princes are vested with honorific titles of the Byzantine court, including kouropalates, or "minister of the imperial palace" (approximate date).
- The main redaction of the Babylonian Talmud is completed under Rabbis Ravina and Ashi (approximate date).
- Chararic, king of the Suevi, converts to Catholicism.
- In Ireland, the Diocese of Tuam is erected.

== Births ==
- probable
  - Pope Boniface IV (approximate date)
  - Finbarr of Cork, Irish bishop (approximate date)
  - Gallus, Irish missionary (approximate date)
  - Gaugericus, bishop of Cambrai (approximate date)
  - John Moschus, Byzantine monk (approximate date)
  - Peter III of Callinicum, Syriac Orthodox Patriarch of Antioch (approximate date)

== Deaths ==
- May 8 – Desideratus, French saint
- exact date unknown
  - Aryabhata, Indian mathematician-astronomer (b. 476)
  - Buddhapālita, Indian Madhyamaka scholar (b. 470)
  - Drest V, king of the Picts
  - Germanus, Byzantine general (magister militum)
- probable
  - Dubricius, British bishop and saint
  - Eustathius of Mtskheta, Orthodox Christian saint
