= 461 Apahunik' earthquake =

Coordinates: 38.855°N 42.754°E

The 461 Apahunik' earthquake affected the province of Apahunik', located to the north of Lake Van, in Anatolia.

The main source for this earthquake is the chronicle of Yovhannēs Awagerec' (13th century). The historian Ghazar Parpetsi (6th century) also mentions this earthquake, but dates it to 25 July, 454. Ghazar's narrative connects this earthquake to the martyrdom of the companions of Łewond (Latin: Leontius) at Rewan, in the vicinity of Nishapur. On the evening of 25 July, a severe earthquake reportedly affected Rewan. "Great noises and fearful voices" were coming from the ground, massive clouds covered the Earth, and thunder and lightning shook the mountains. The corpses of the martyrs were enveloped in a rainbow-like "column of light", while the nearby guards were rolling to the ground due to the earthquake. Ghazar's narrative estimated that the earthquake lasted for one day and two nights.

The historian Yeghishe (Latin:Eliseus, 5th century) depicts the same earthquake in terms of a hagiography. He does not mention a location, and his narrative lacks Ghazar's "realistic details".

Rewan is otherwise described as a village of the magi, located in "the land of Apar". A critical edition of Ghazar's text contains an estimation of Rewan's distance from Nishapur. According to it, the village was located at least 6 Persian leagues from Nishapur. The historian Sebeos (7th century) reports that the location of this martyrdom was called Apr-Shahr, and that Apr-Shahr was located in "T'elark'uni".

The historian Faustus of Byzantium (5th century), reported that Apahunik' was an "erkir" (quarter). Its capital was Manzikert. This "Armeno-Byzantine" city's ruins are located within modern Malazgirt.

== Sources ==
- Guidoboni, Emanuela; Traina, Giusto (1995), "A new catalogue of earthquakes in the historical Armenian area from antiquity to the 12th century", Annals of Geophysics, 38, doi:10.4401/ag-4134
