= 468 =

468 in various calendars
- Gregorian calendar: 468; CDLXVIII
- Ab urbe condita: 1221
- Assyrian calendar: 5218
- Balinese saka calendar: 389–390
- Bengali calendar: −126 – −125
- Berber calendar: 1418
- Buddhist calendar: 1012
- Burmese calendar: −170
- Byzantine calendar: 5976–5977
- Chinese calendar: 丁未年 (Fire Goat); 3165 or 2958 — to — 戊申年 (Earth Monkey); 3166 or 2959
- Coptic calendar: 184–185
- Discordian calendar: 1634
- Ethiopian calendar: 460–461
- Hebrew calendar: 4228–4229
- Hindu calendars
- Vikram Samvat: 524–525
- Shaka Samvat: 389–390
- Kali Yuga: 3568–3569
- Holocene calendar: 10468
- Iranian calendar: 154 BP – 153 BP
- Islamic calendar: 159 BH – 158 BH
- Javanese calendar: 353–354
- Julian calendar: 468; CDLXVIII
- Korean calendar: 2801
- Minguo calendar: 1444 before ROC 民前1444年
- Nanakshahi calendar: −1000
- Seleucid era: 779/780 AG
- Thai solar calendar: 1010–1011
- Tibetan calendar: མེ་མོ་ལུག་ལོ་ (female Fire-Sheep); 594 or 213 or −559 — to — ས་ཕོ་སྤྲེ་ལོ་ (male Earth-Monkey); 595 or 214 or −558

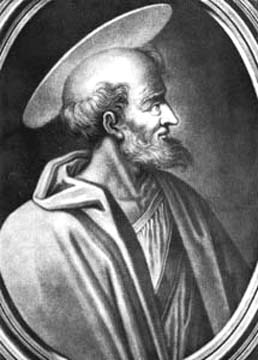
Pope Simplicius (468–483)

Year 468 (CDLXVIII) was a leap year starting on Monday of the Julian calendar. At the time, it was known as the Year of the Consulship of Anthemius without colleague (or, less frequently, year 1221 Ab urbe condita). The denomination 468 for this year has been used since the early medieval period, when the Anno Domini calendar era became the prevalent method in Europe for naming years.

== Events ==
=== By place ===
==== Roman Empire ====
- Emperor Leo I assembles a massive naval expedition at Constantinople, which costs 64,000 pounds of gold (more than a year's revenue) and consists of over 1,100 ships carrying 100,000 men. It is the greatest fleet ever sent against the Vandals and brings Leo near to bankruptcy.
- Emperor Anthemius sends a Roman expedition under command of Marcellinus. He expels the Vandals from Sicily and retakes Sardinia. The Eastern general Heraclius of Edessa lands with a force on the Libyan coast, east of Carthage, and advances from Tripolitania.
- Battle of Cape Bon: The Vandals defeat the Roman navy under Basiliscus, anchored at Promontorium Mercurii, 45 miles from Carthage (Tunisia). During peace negotiations Genseric uses fire ships, filling them with brushwood and pots of oil, destroying 700 imperial galleys. Basiliscus escapes with his surviving fleet to Sicily, harassed all the way by Moorish pirates.
- August – Marcellinus is murdered in Sicily, probably at the instigation of his political rival, Ricimer. Heraclius is left to fight alone against the Vandals; after a 2-year campaign in the desert he returns to Constantinople.
- Basiliscus returns to Constantinople after a disastrous expedition against the Vandals. He is forced to seek sanctuary in the church of Hagia Sophia to escape the wrath of the people. Leo I gives him imperial pardon, but banishes him for 3 years to Heraclea Sintica (Thrace).
- Dengizich, son of Attila the Hun, sends an embassy to Constantinople to demand money. Leo I offers the Huns settlement in Thrace in exchange for recognition of his authority. Dengizich refuses and crosses the Danube.
- Revolt of Euric: The Goths in Aquitania revolts. Their king Euric occupies the south of Gaul.
- Roman forces under Anagast defeat the Huns at the river Utus (Vit, Bulgaria). Dengizich is killed and his head is paraded through the streets of Constantinople. Stuck on the end of a wooden pole, it is displayed above the Xylokerkos Gate.
- The Vandals reconquer Sicily, administering a decisive defeat to the Western forces.

==== Jiaozhou (Vietnam) ====
- March – Jiaozhou governor Lưu Mục dies of illness. Lý Trường Nhân, a nobleman, launches a coup d'état against the Jiaozhou government, kills the Liu Song officials in Jiaozhou, seizes control of the citadel, then declares himself the governor.
- August – Emperor Ming of Song grants Lưu Bột the title of Jiaozhou governor, along with an army to retake Jiaozhou from Lý Trường Nhân. After landing in Jiaozhou, Lưu Bột is quickly defeated by Lý Trường Nhân, and dies shortly afterward.
- November – Lý Trường Nhân sends an envoy to make peace with the Liu Song, and requests the title of "Hành Châu sự", a position with less authority than that of the Governor of Jiaozhou. Emperor Ming approves Trường Nhân's request, granting him the authority to govern Jiaozhou until 479.

=== By topic ===
==== Religion ====
- February 29 – Pope Hilarius dies at Rome after a 6½-year reign, and is succeeded by Simplicius as the 47th pope.

== Births ==
- Nectan of Hartland, Welsh prince and saint (approximate date)

== Deaths ==
- February 29, – Pope Hilarius
- Gunabhadra, Indian Buddhist scholar-monk (b. 394)
- Marcellinus, Roman general (magister militum)
