= Battle of Déols =

5th-century battle between Visigoths and Bretons in France

- Part of the Gothic revolt of Euric
Date	c. 469
Location	Déols, Gaul
Result	Visigothic victory

Belligerents
Visigoths	Britons and/or Bretons; Gallo-Romans

Commanders and leaders
Euric	Riothamus †? (possibly Ambrosius Aurelianus)

Strength
Unknown	Unknown

Casualties and losses
Unknown	Unknown

The Battle of Déols was a battle c. 469 in the Gothic revolt of Euric. With this battle Euric king of the Visigoths thwarted an attack by an alliance of Bretons or Britons of the Romano-British Riothamus and the Gauls.
