= Lusidius =

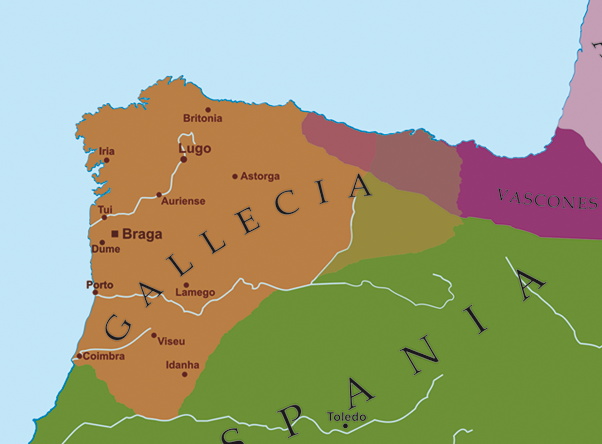
Approximate borders of the Kingdom of Galicia immediately preceding Lusidius' submission to the Suebi.

Lusidius was a Hispano-Roman man who surrendered the city of Olisipo (modern Lisbon, Portugal) to the Suevic Kingdom in 469. The event occurred immediately after the sack of Conimbriga by the Suevi the previous year. After submitting to the Suevic king Remismund, he became employed as an ambassador to the Western Roman Empire, notably leading a Suevic embassy to Emperor Anthemius.
