= Paul (comes) =

5th century Roman military commander

Count Paul was a Roman military leader who, with Roman and Frankish forces, attacked and looted Visigothic forces in about 470, probably somewhere in the region of Bourges, after the Battle of Déols.

He apparently died soon afterwards within the same series of battles, probably in or near Angers. The evidence is unclear about whether Paul was on the same side as Childeric the Frankish king, but it is likely.

== Evidence ==
Paul is mentioned only in one 6th century source, Gregory of Tours, who referred to him using the Roman rank of comes, sometimes translated as count. The passage seems to be made up of quotes about conflicts in the Loire region from a chronicle and is considered by modern scholars to be "only loosely connected to together, and ambiguous in terms of chronology and cause and effect".

The first part mentions the death of Aegidius which is known from other sources to have happened about 465. The first conflict (or conflicts) mentioned, involving Orleans, is generally equated to the Battle of Orleans, which three other sources (Hydatius, Marius of Avranches, and the Gallic Chronicle of 511) seem to report as happening in 463, and involving either Franks, or Aegidius.

Igitur Childericus Aurilianis pugnas egit,	Now Childeric fought battles at Orléans,
Adovacrius vero cum Saxonibus Andecavo venit.	while Adovacrius came with the Saxons to Angers.
Magna tunc lues populum devastavit.	At that time a great plague devastated the people.
Mortuus est autem Egidius et reliquit filium Syagrium nomine.	Aegidius died and left a son named Syagrius.

This is continued with a series of events which are normally dated to the period around 469-470 during the Gothic revolt of Euric, when the Visigoths attempted to expand their territory into northern Gaul, after the emperor Anthemius called upon a force from Britain led by Riothamus to help.

Quo defuncto, Adovacrius de Andecavo vel aliis locis obsedes accepit.	After his [Aegidius'] death, Adovacrius received hostages from Angers and from other places.
Brittani de Bituricas a Gothis expulsi sunt, multis apud Dolensim vicum peremptis.	The Britons were driven out of the territory of the Bituriges by the Goths, many having been killed near the village of Déols.
Paulos vero comes cum Romanis ac Francis Gothis bella intulit et praedas egit.	Count Paul, meanwhile, together with Romans and Franks, made war on the Goths and took booty.
Veniente vero Adovacrio Andecavus, Childericus rex sequenti die advenit	When Adovacrius came to Angers, King Childeric arrived on the following day;
interemptoque Paulo comite, civitatem obtinuit.	Count Paul having been killed, he took possession of the city.
Magno ea die incendio domus ecclesiae concremata est.	On that day, the house of the church was consumed by a great fire.

This is generally seen as meaning that Count Paul was killed during the fighting at Angers, and was replaced by Childeric as commander of the Roman and Frankish forces. After Childeric captured Angers the forces who pursued the defeated Saxons are described by Gregory as Romans. However, both the Chronicle of Fredegar and the Liber Historiae Francorum interpreted Gregory to mean that Childeric himself killed Count Paul, and historians such as James believe this is quite possible, given that there had been several factions of Romans competing for power in Gaul, and such a faction had been willing to take the Visigothic side against Aegidius previously.

== Primary sources ==
- Gregory of Tours, Historia Francorum
- Fredegar, Chronicle of Fredegar
- Cassiodorus, Chronicon Cassiodori
