= Arvandus =

5th-century praetorian prefect of Gaul

- Born: Gaul
- Military career
- Service years: 461–472
- Rank: Praetorian Prefect

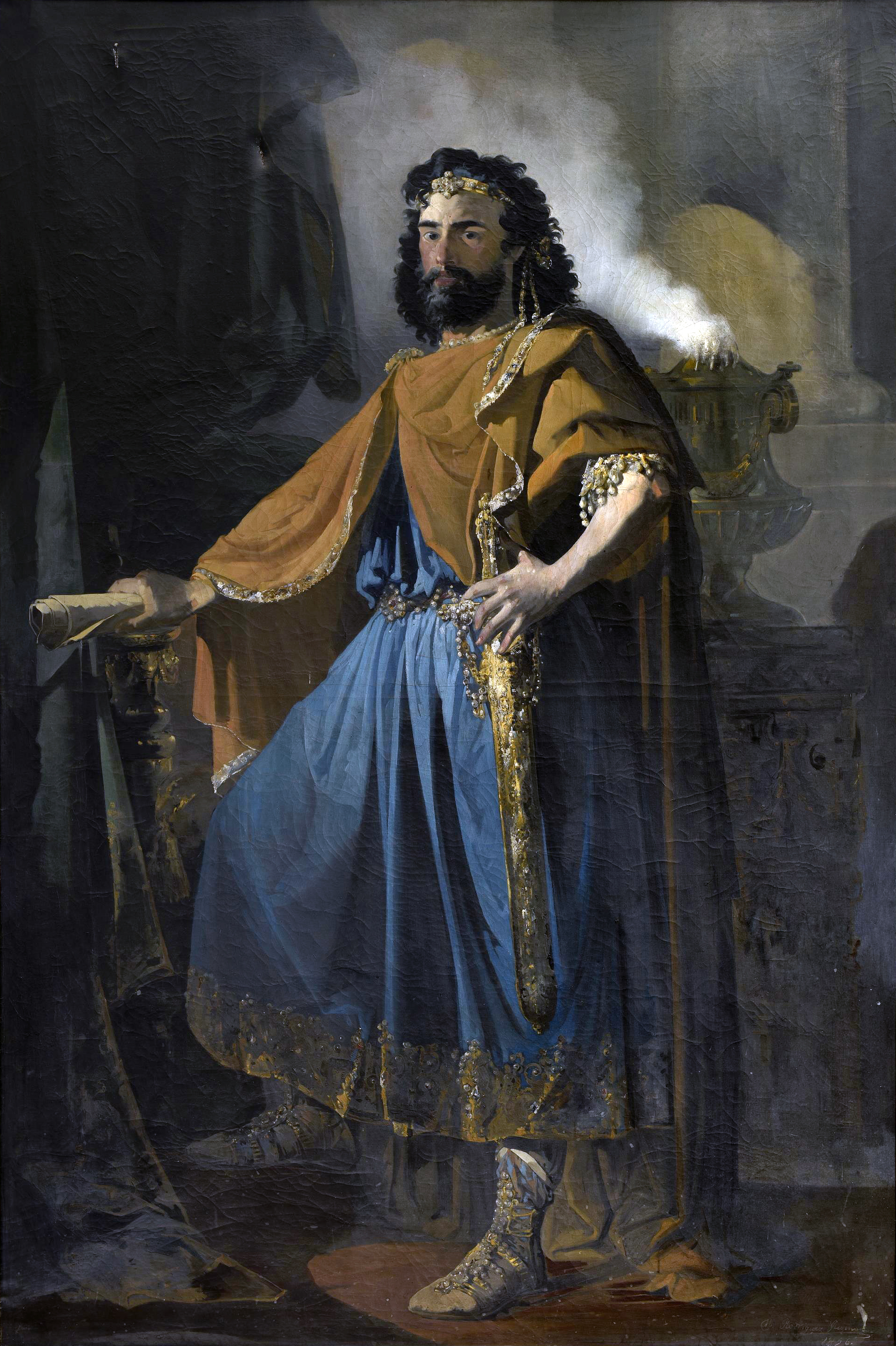
Imaginary portrait of Euric (440–484), King of the Visigoths

Arvandus was a Gaul who rose through the hierarchy of Imperial Roman society to twice be appointed Praetorian prefect of Gaul.

== Career ==
On the first occasion, 461, he was appointed by Emperor Libius Severus. This appointment ended when Severus died in 465. Two years later, in 467, he was appointed by Anthemius.

His friend and chronicler, Sidonius Apollinaris, records that his first term was successful and he himself well liked. However, in his second term he found himself widely hated, and in 468 or 469 was removed from office and brought to Rome in chains. Here he was accused by envoys from a commission of influential Gauls of committing treason. The envoys brought with them a letter which Arvandus' secretary attested had been dictated by Arvandus. In it, Arvandus set out to dissuade Euric, king of the Visigoths, from concluding peace with the Western Roman Emperor, urging that instead, he should attack the Britons north of the Loire. The letter asserted that the Law of Nations called for a division of Gaul between the Visigoths and Burgundians.

Riothamus, King of the Britons, was allied to Roman Emperor Anthemius, so this was tantamount to declaring war on the Emperor. Arvandus was put on trial for treason. The trial should have been overseen by Sidonius, but Sidonius chose to resign his position instead, and plead for clemency on behalf of his friend. At his trial, Arvandus was found guilty and was stripped on the spot of all the privileges pertaining to his prefecture, and consigned to the common jail to await execution.

Cassiodorus asserts that Arvandus' intention was to divide the empire and seize the throne: It may be that Arvandus was hoping to obtain the throne with aid from the Gauls and the Visigoths, in the manner of the previous attempt by Avitus. If so, Arvandus was disappointed; he received no support from the Gallic aristocracy. Possibly this was a result of his undistinguished birth, but the great majority of the Gauls would have learned from Avitus' example, and realized that the day for such adventures was long past.

Cassiodorius reports that Sidonius and his friends were successful in saving Arvandus from the death penalty. "At the order of Anthemius, Arvandus, who had attempted to become emperor, was sent into exile" ("Arabundus imperium temptans iussu Anthemii exilio deportatur").

== See also ==
- Gothic revolt of Euric
