= Déols =

- Commune
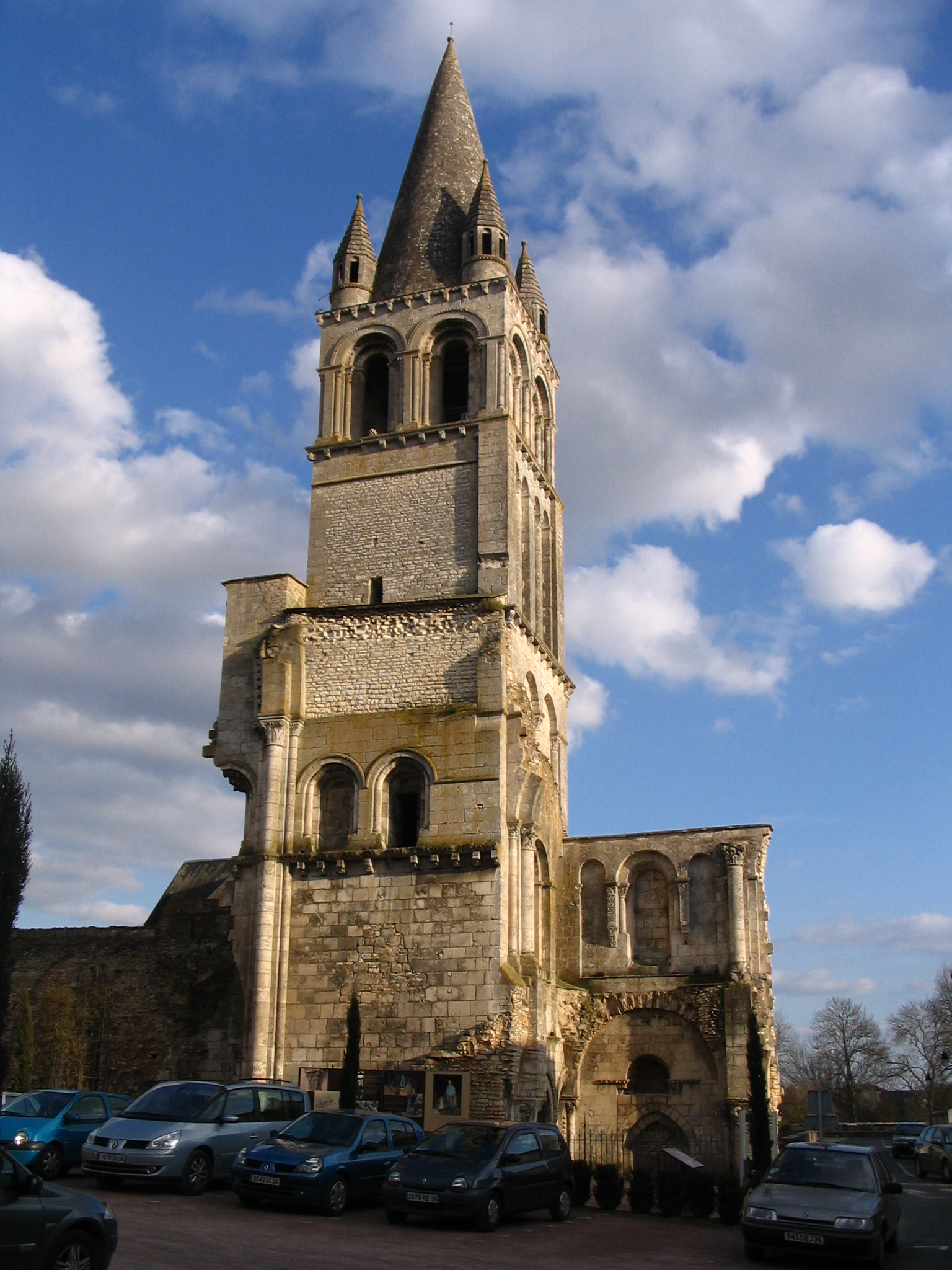
- The Abbey of Déols

- Coat of arms
- Location of Déols
- Location within France Location within Centre-Val de Loire
- Coordinates: 46°49′51″N 1°42′24″E
- Country: France
- Region: Centre-Val de Loire
- Department: Indre
- Arrondissement: Châteauroux
- Canton: Châteauroux-1
- Intercommunality: CA Châteauroux Métropole

Government
  - Mayor (2021–2026): Delphine Geneste
- Area^{1}: 31.74 km^{2} (12.25 sq mi)
- Elevation: 150 m (490 ft)
- Highest elevation: 165 m (541 ft)
- Lowest elevation: 140 m (460 ft)
- Population (2023): 7,600
  - Density: 240/km^{2} (620/sq mi)
- Time zone: UTC+01:00 (CET)
  - Summer (DST): UTC+02:00 (CEST)
- INSEE/Postal code: 36063 /36130
- ^{1} French Land Register data, which excludes lakes, ponds, glaciers > 1 km^{2} (0.386 sq mi or 247 acres) and river estuaries.

Déols (French pronunciation: [deɔl]) is a commune in the department of Indre, region of Centre-Val de Loire, central France.

Déols is an ancient town with a famous Benedictine abbey, Abbaye Notre-Dame-du-Bourg-Dieu. Today it is somewhat overshadowed by the nearby city of Châteauroux, which faces it across the river Indre.

It preserves a fine Romanesque tower and other remains of the abbey church, once the most important in the duchy of Berry.

== History ==
Toponyms revealing the presence of former Neolithic dolmens (Grandes and Petites Pierres Folles), near the resurgent springs of the Montet into the river Indre, above which a Gaulish village of the Bituriges was later established, then a nearby Gallo-Roman fanum, confirm the age of Vicus Dolensis or Dolus. The village was moved westward by the Romans next to the antique ford and later bridge built over the river Indre on the road from Paris to Toulouse. In 469 or 470 the Visigoths of Euric defeated the army of the Briton king Riothamus at the battle of Déols, the victory carrying with it the supremacy over the district of Berry and initiating the Visigothic threat over the last years of the Roman empire. But it was only during the Middle Ages that, through the pilgrimage to the tomb of Saint Ludre and his father Saint Léocade in the crypts of the parish church of St Stephen built upon their graves, later one of the steps on the route from Paris to Santiago de Compostela, then through the lords of Déols and Châteauroux, that Déols acquired its significance.

The Benedictine abbey of Our Lady of Déols was founded in 917 by Ebbes the Noble, prince of Déols. He gave his palace, originally the villa of Saint Ludre according to legend, to the monks in order to build a monastery and transferred his residence to Châteauroux, where the monks of Saint-Gildas-de-Rhuys in Brittany took as well refuge from Norman raids from 920 to 1008 with the relics of Saint Gildas, and founded another abbey under his vocable. The name of the new town comes from Château Raoul, the castle overlooking the river Indre built about 2 kilometres (1.2 mi) west by Raoul, son of Ebbes, rebuilt in the 15th c. and later seat of the Préfet, then departemental assembly. For centuries this change did not affect the prosperity of the place of Déols, which was maintained by the prestige of its abbey. The abbey was rebuilt about 1150 with seven towers, of which only one remains, on a floorplan larger than the cathedral of Bourges; its dependencies, both churches and priories, extended through seven dioceses.

A gateway faces the remains of the old bridge destroyed by a flood in the 17th c., next to the northern part of the medieval ramparts of the town and, opposite the city, a second gateway is flanked by two towers and bears the city clock. The parish church of St Stephen (10th to 16th centuries) has a Romanesque façade and two symmetrical crypts containing antique sarcophagus, a marble carved one brought from Rome and a limestone one, which are the ancient Christian tombs of Saint Léocade, who according to the tradition of Limousin was senator and proconsul of subligerian Gaul, and of his son Saint Ludre, the lords of the town in the late 3rd and early 4th centuries. They were baptised by St Ursin and founded the church of Sainte-Marie-la-Petite, suppressed a few years before the Revolution. Some walls of the original funerary chapel from the late 6th c. or 7th c. remain above the crypt of Saint Ludre, as well as traces of 12th c. frescoes and some paintings from the 17th century represent the ancient abbey and the miracle of Déols. In the late 18th c. the church of Saint Germain, also dating from the 10th to 16th c., which was intended to be destroyed by the city for the creation of the new road to Paris, was preserved but sold.

In the Middle Ages the head of the family of Déols enjoyed the title of prince and held sway over nearly all Lower Berry, of which the town itself was the capital. The last of the house was Raoul VII, who died in 1177 leaving a three-year-old heiress, Denise. Henry II of England took the child, who represented the inheritance of Déols-Châteauroux, worth more, it was said, than all of Normandy, into his care, and affianced her to one of his barons, Baudoin de Reviers 3rd Earl of Devon and at his death to André de Chauvigny.

In 1187, during the war between Henry II and his sons (Richard the Lionheart, Prince John) and Philip Augustus, the truce declared at Châteauroux was so unexpected that it was attributed to a "miracle of Our Lady of Déols" and published in a Liber miraculorum B. Mariae Dolensis. This influenced the religious devotion of the inhabitants of the region towards the Virgin Mary. The Chapel of Notre-Dame des Miracles built on the north side of the abbey to protect the statue was destroyed in 1833 and the statue was then transported to the church of St Stephen where it is still today.

The abbey church was sacked by the Protestants and burned out in 1568, during the religious wars; not one of the manuscripts from its library has been identified. In 1627 the abbey was suppressed by the agency of Henry II, prince of Condé and of Déols, who received its annual incomes, after the monks were denounced for corruption. With the abbey in ruins, the town declined and was eclipsed by its neighbour.

== Present ==
Today, Déols is the third largest town in the Indre département with 7,600 inhabitants.

Déols has succeeded in creating new dynamism through its economic, sports and cultural activities.

Déols is not only situated on the A20 motorway (250 km south of Paris), but is also on a direct railway line from Paris (2 hours) to Toulouse.

The Châteauroux-Déols "Marcel Dassault" Airport is sited on the northern approach to Déols, where there is also a 5 square kilometres (1.9 mi^{2}) business park.

== Population ==
Historical population

Year	Pop.	±% p.a.
1793	1,424	—
1800	1,515	+0.89%
1806	1,561	+0.50%
1821	1,759	+0.80%
1831	2,113	+1.85%
1836	2,280	+1.53%
1841	2,344	+0.56%
1846	2,507	+1.35%
1851	2,575	+0.54%
1856	2,355	−1.77%
1861	2,415	+0.50%
1866	2,564	+1.20%
1872	2,564	+0.00%
1876	2,650	+0.83%
1881	2,757	+0.79%
1886	2,773	+0.12%
1891	2,657	−0.85%
1896	2,665	+0.06%
1901	2,737	+0.53%

Year	Pop.	±% p.a.
1906	2,681	−0.41%
1911	2,760	+0.58%
1921	3,275	+1.73%
1926	3,042	−1.47%
1931	3,616	+3.52%
1936	3,617	+0.01%
1946	3,863	+0.66%
1954	4,453	+1.79%
1962	6,340	+4.52%
1968	4,834	−4.42%
1975	8,431	+8.27%
1982	7,639	−1.40%
1990	7,875	+0.38%
1999	8,089	+0.30%
2007	8,734	+0.96%
2012	8,062	−1.59%
2017	7,513	−1.40%
2023	7,600	+0.19%

Source: EHESS and INSEE (1968-2023)

== Personalities ==
- Jeanette Bougrab, born 1973 in Déols

== See also ==
- Communes of the Indre department
