= 459 =

459 in various calendars
- Gregorian calendar: 459; CDLIX
- Ab urbe condita: 1212
- Assyrian calendar: 5209
- Balinese saka calendar: 380–381
- Bengali calendar: −135 – −134
- Berber calendar: 1409
- Buddhist calendar: 1003
- Burmese calendar: −179
- Byzantine calendar: 5967–5968
- Chinese calendar: 戊戌年 (Earth Dog); 3156 or 2949 — to — 己亥年 (Earth Pig); 3157 or 2950
- Coptic calendar: 175–176
- Discordian calendar: 1625
- Ethiopian calendar: 451–452
- Hebrew calendar: 4219–4220
- Hindu calendars
- Vikram Samvat: 515–516
- Shaka Samvat: 380–381
- Kali Yuga: 3559–3560
- Holocene calendar: 10459
- Iranian calendar: 163 BP – 162 BP
- Islamic calendar: 168 BH – 167 BH
- Javanese calendar: 344–345
- Julian calendar: 459; CDLIX
- Korean calendar: 2792
- Minguo calendar: 1453 before ROC 民前1453年
- Nanakshahi calendar: −1009
- Seleucid era: 770/771 AG
- Thai solar calendar: 1001–1002
- Tibetan calendar: ས་ཕོ་ཁྱི་ལོ་ (male Earth-Dog); 585 or 204 or −568 — to — ས་མོ་ཕག་ལོ་ (female Earth-Boar); 586 or 205 or −567

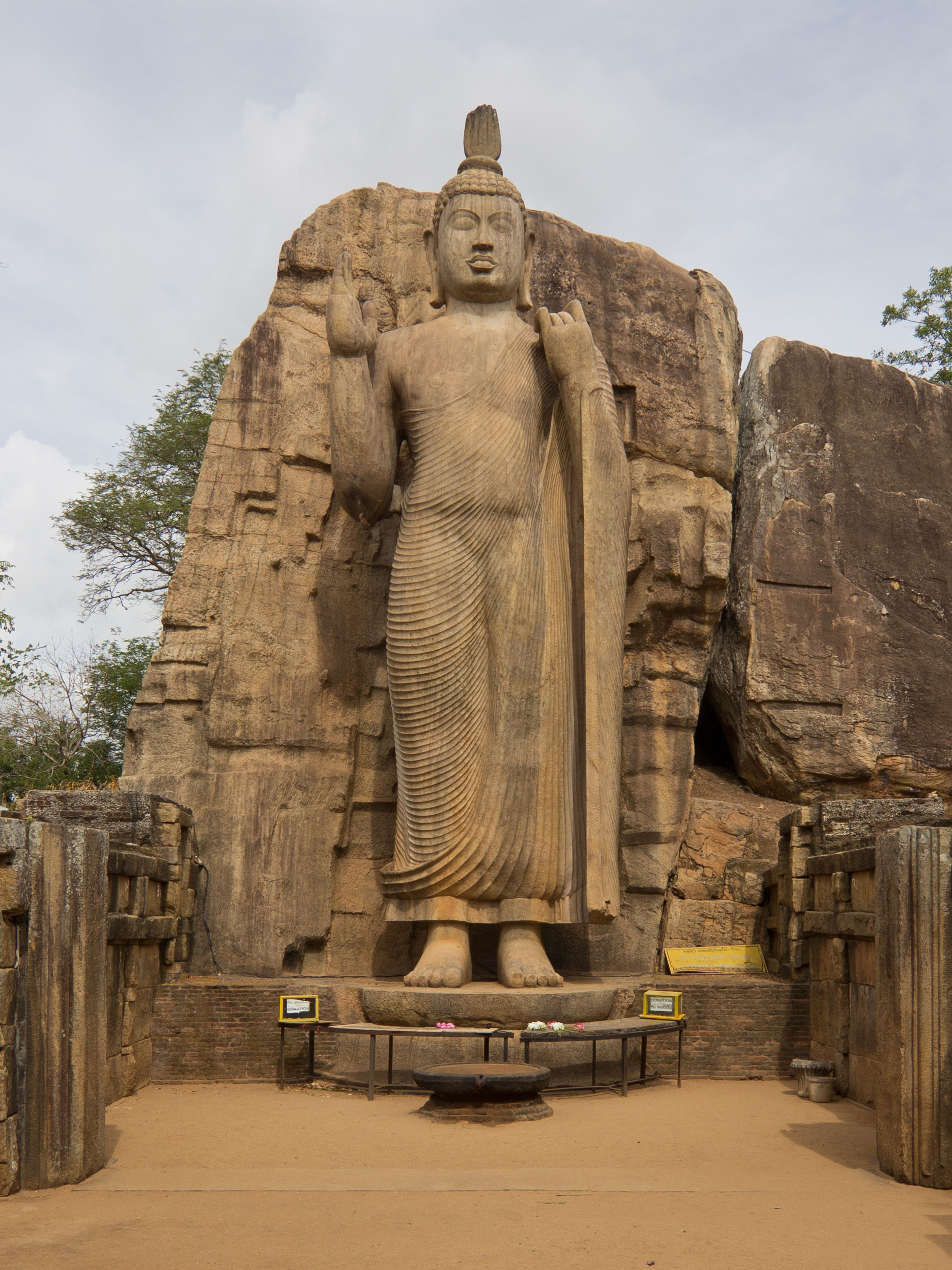
The Avukana Buddha Statue (Sri Lanka)

Year 459 (CDLIX) was a common year starting on Thursday of the Julian calendar. At the time, it was known in the Roman Empire as the Year of the Consulship of Ricimer and Patricius (or, less frequently, year 1212 Ab urbe condita). The denomination 459 for this year has been used since the early medieval period, when the Anno Domini calendar era became the prevalent method in Europe for naming years.

== Events ==
=== By place ===
==== Roman Empire ====
- Emperor Leo I signs a peace treaty with the Ostrogoths. King Theodemir sends his son, the future Theodoric the Great, age 5, as a child hostage to Constantinople. He learns at court about Latin, military tactics and religion (until 469).

==== Britannia ====
- King Vortigern is burnt to death, while being besieged by a Romano-British force under Ambrosius Aurelianus at Ganarew (Herefordshire).

==== Europe ====
- The Franks conquer the city of Trier. The Frankish Kingdom becomes a military power and gets involved in Roman politics.
- Remigius, age 22, is elected bishop of Reims (approximate date).

==== Asia ====
- King Dhatusena of Anuradhapura of the Moriyan dynasty rules over Sri Lanka. During his reign the Avukana Buddha statue is built.

=== Other events ===
• Total lunar eclipse on May 3, in which totality was for 106 minutes and 32 seconds. A totality of this length will not occur until August 19, 4763.

== Births ==
- November 15 – Bʼutz Aj Sak Chiik, king of Palenque (Mexico).

== Deaths ==
- September 2 – Simeon Stylites, Christian pillar-saint.
- Hormizd III, king of the Sasanian Empire (approximate date)
- Vortigern, king of the Britons (approximate date)
