= Riothamus =

5th-century Romano-British military leader

Riothamus (also spelled Riutimus or Riotimus) was a Romano-British military leader who was active circa AD 470. He fought against the Goths in alliance with the declining Western Roman Empire. He is called "King of the Britons" by the 6th-century historian Jordanes, but the extent of his realm is unclear. Some Arthurian scholars identify Riothamus as a possible inspiration for the King Arthur of legend.

== Name ==
Riothamus is a Latinization of the Brythonic *Rigotamos, meaning 'Great King', 'Kingliest'. Alternatively, it may come from Brittonic *Riiotamos, meaning 'Freest'. The Brittonic form survived into Old Welsh as Riatav (Modern Welsh Rhiadaf) and Old Breton Riat(h)am.

== Realm ==
It is not clear whether Jordanes' "Britons" refers to the Britons of Great Britain itself, or of Armorica, which was undergoing significant British settlement and later came to be known as Brittany.

The Old Breton name Riatam, which (like Riothamus) is derived from Brittonic *Rigotamos, appears in medieval Breton records (primarily biographies of early Breton saints) as one of the Princes of Domnonée (a coastal region in Brittany which takes its name from Dumnonia in southern Britain). He is identified as a son of Deroch II. For chronological reasons, this Riatam is probably a different individual from Jordanes' Riothamus, who lived earlier.

== Correspondence with Sidonius Apollinaris ==
More secure information is provided by a letter which has survived that was written to Riothamus from Sidonius Apollinaris, bishop of Clermont, who requested his judgment for "an obscure and humble person" who had had his slaves enticed away by a group of armed Bretons. According to C.E.V. Nixon, the letter is evidence that Armorica at this time was becoming "like a magnet to peasants, coloni, slaves and the hard-pressed" as Roman power weakened. Poorer subjects of Rome with no stake in land ownership found Breton territory to be a safe haven from the Goths.

=== The letter ===
Sidonius Riothamo suo salutem.
Servatur nostri consuetudo sermonis: namque miscemus cum salutatione querimoniam, non omnino huic rei studentes, ut stilus noster sit officiosus in titulis, asper in paginis, sed quod ea semper eveniunt, de quibus loci mei aut ordinis hominem constat inconciliari, si loquatur, peccare, si taceat. sed et ipsi sarcinam vestri pudoris inspicimus, cuius haec semper verecundia fuit, ut pro culpis erubesceretis alienis. Gerulus epistularum humilis obscurus despicabilisque etiam usque ad damnum innocentis ignaviae mancipia sua Britannis clam sollicitantibus abducta deplorat. incertum mihi est an sit certa causatio; sed si inter coram positos aequanimiter obiecta discingitis, arbitror hunc laboriosum posse probare quod obicit, si tamen inter argutos armatos tumultuosos, virtute numero contubernio contumaces, poterit ex aequo et bono solus inermis, abiectus rusticus, peregrinus pauper audiri. vale.

=== Translation ===
Sidonius sends greetings to Riothamus
I will write once more in my usual strain, mingling compliment with grievance. Not that I at all desire to follow up the first words of greeting with disagreeable subjects, but things seem to be always happening which a man of my order and in my position can neither mention without unpleasantness, nor pass over without neglect of duty. Yet I do my best to remember the burdensome and delicate sense of honour which makes you so ready to blush for others' faults. The bearer of this is an obscure and humble person, so harmless, insignificant, and helpless that he seems to invite his own discomfiture; his grievance is that the Bretons are secretly enticing his slaves away. Whether his indictment is a true one, I cannot say; but if you can only confront the parties and decide the matter on its merits, I think the unfortunate man may be able to make good his charge, if indeed a stranger from the country unarmed, abject and impecunious to boot, has ever a chance of a fair or kindly hearing against adversaries with all the advantages he lacks, arms, astuteness, turbulences, and the aggressive spirit of men backed by numerous friends. Farewell.

== War with the Goths ==
Jordanes states that Riothamus supported the Romans against the Visigoths led by Euric (who lived c. 440 – 484). In The Origin and Deeds of the Goths, he states that Riothamus brought a British army to supplement Roman forces but suffered defeat fighting against overwhelming odds when the Goths intercepted his force:

=== Jordanes, Getica, XLV.237–238 ===
Euricus ergo, Vesegotharum rex, crebram mutationem Romanorum principum cernens Gallias suo iure nisus est occupare. Quod conperiens Anthemius imperator Brittonum solacia postulavit. Quorum rex Riotimus cum duodecim milia veniens in Beturigas civitate Oceano e navibus egresso susceptus est. Vad quos rex Vesegotharum Eurichus innumerum ductans advenit exercitum diuque pugnans Riutimum Brittonum rege, antequam Romani in eius societate coniungerentur, effugavit. Qui amplam partem exercitus amissam cum quibus potuit fugiens ad Burgundzonum gentem vicinam Romanisque in eo tempore foederatam advenit. Eurichus vero rex Vesegotharum Arevernam Galliae civitatem occupavit Anthemio principe iam defuncto....

==== Translation ====
"Now Euric, king of the Visigoths, perceived the frequent change of Roman Emperors and strove to hold Gaul by his own right. The Emperor Anthemius heard of it and asked the Brittones for aid. Their King Riotimus came with twelve thousand men into the state of the Bituriges by the way of Ocean, and was received as he disembarked from his ships. (238) Euric, king of the Visigoths, came against them with an innumerable army, and after a long fight he routed Riotimus, King of the Britons, before the Romans could join him. So when he had lost a great part of his army, he fled with all the men he could gather together, and came to the Burgundians, a neighboring tribe then allied to the Romans. But Euric, king of the Visigoths, seized the Gallic city of Arvernum; for the Emperor Anthemius was now dead."

A letter from Sidonius Apollinaris to his friend Vincentius, written circa 468 AD, records that Roman officials intercepted a letter written by the Praetorian Prefect of Gaul, Arvandus, to the Visigothic king Euric stating that "the Britons stationed beyond the Loire should be attacked" and that the Visigoths and Burgundians (who were at the time clients of the Romans) should divide Gaul between them; this has led some scholars (such as Geoffrey Ashe) to suggest that Arvandus betrayed Riothamus. This letter does not mention Riothamus by name, however, and (based on the reconstruction of the chronology of Sidonius' letters), it is possible that Riothamus and his forces were not the direct subject of Arvandus' message to Euric, as Arvandus was already under arrest and on his way to Rome before Riothamus had even entered the fray against the Visigoths, sometime between 470 and 472 AD (the latter being the year of emperor Anthemius' death).

=== Gregory of Tours, Historia Francorum, II.18 ===
Gregory of Tours seems to react to the outcome of the battle between the Visigoths and Britons:

II.18. Quod Childericus Aurilianus et Andecavo venit Odovacrius. Igitur Childericus Aurilianis pugnas egit, Adovacrius vero cum Saxonibus Andecavo venit. Magna tunc lues populum devastavit. Mortuus est autem Egidius et reliquit filium Syagrium nomine. Quo defuncto, Adovacrius de Andecavo vel aliis locis obsedes accepit. Brittani de Bituricas a Gothis expulsi sunt, multis apud Dolensim vicum peremptis. Paulos vero comes cum Romanis ac Francis Gothis bella intulit et praedas egit. Veniente vero Adovacrio Andecavus, Childericus rex sequenti die advenit, interemptoque Paulo comite, civitatem obtinuit. Magnum ea die incendio domus aeclesiae concremata est.

==== Translation ====
II.18. How Childeric went to Orleans and Odoacer to Angers. Now Childeric fought at Orléans and Odoacer came with the Saxons to Angers. At that time a great plague destroyed the people. Aegidius died and left a son, Syagrius by name. On his death Odoacer received hostages from Angers and other places. The Britanni were driven from Bourges by the Goths, many having been slain at the village of Déols. Count Paul with the Romans and Franks made war on the Goths and took booty. When Odoacer came to Angers, king Childeric came on the following day, and slew count Paul, and took the city. In a great fire on that day the house of the bishop was burned.

== Riothamus as King Arthur or Ambrosius Aurelianus ==
Riothamus has been identified as a candidate for the historical King Arthur by several scholars over the centuries, notably the historian Geoffrey Ashe, primarily due to Riothamus's activities in Gaul, which bear a casual resemblance to King Arthur's Gallic campaign as first recorded by Geoffrey of Monmouth in his Historia Regum Britanniae. Geoffrey Ashe has suggested a link between Riothamus' alleged betrayal by Arvandus and Arthur's betrayal by Mordred in the Historia Regum Britanniae, and proposes that Riothamus' last known position was near the Burgundian town of Avallon (not noted by any ancient source mentioning Riothamus), which he suggests is the basis for the Arthurian connection to Avalon.

Academic historian Léon Fleuriot argued that Riothamus is identical to Ambrosius Aurelianus, a historical figure in Britain around this time who, in the early narratives containing Arthur, preceded Arthur. Fleuriot suggested that "Riothamus" was Aurelianus' title as overlord of all Brythonic territories. He noted that "Riothamus" and Aurelianus are contemporaneous and that Aurelianus is the only British leader of the time who is identified (albeit much later) as ruling both Brythons and Franks, which could only be the case if he ruled territory in Brittany. He also suggested that the name "Abros" in Breton genealogies is a contraction of "Ambrosius" and that Nennius indicates that Ambrosius was supreme ruler of the Britons, which, Fleuriot argues, would translate as "Riothamus". Fleuriot suggested that Ambrosius led the Britons in the battle against the Goths, but then returned to Britain to continue the war against the Saxons.

== See also ==
- Historicity of King Arthur
- Gothic revolt of Euric
