= Gothic revolt of Euric =

Gothic Revolt of Euric
- Part of Fall of the Roman Empire; Gothic wars
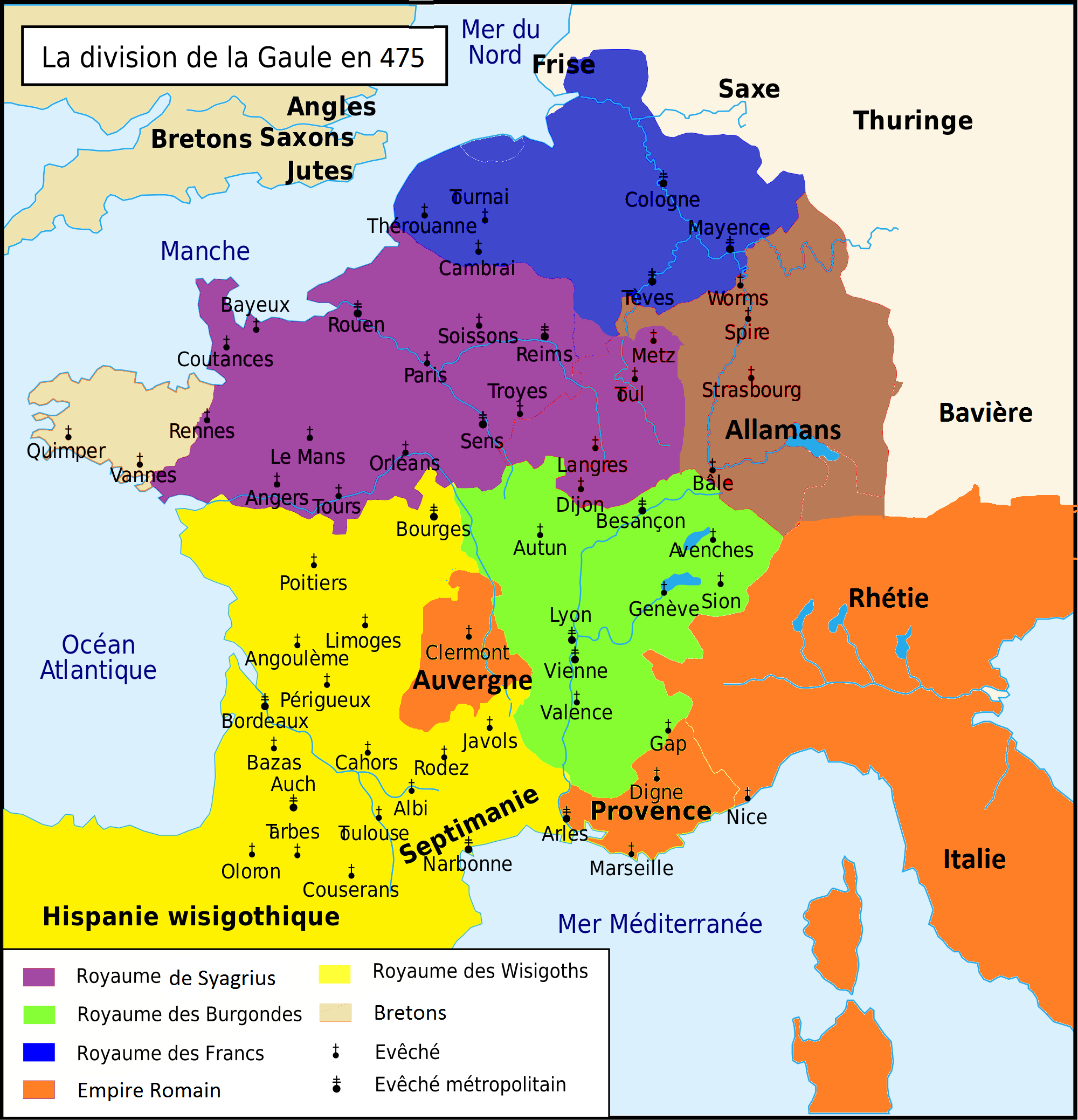
- Gaul in 475
Date	468-471
Location	Gaul
Result	independence Aquitanian Goths

Belligerents
Aquitanian Goths	Romans

Commanders and leaders
Euric; Arvandus; Victorius	Anthemius; Paulus; Childeric I Riothamus; Vincentius

The Revolt of Euric was a military conflict between the Gothic king Euric and the Western Roman Empire between AD 468 and 471. The war marked the collapse of Roman authority in southern Gaul and led to the establishment of an independent Visigothic kingdom centered on Toulouse.

== Background ==
Since AD 418, the Goths had been settled in Aquitania (southwestern Gaul) as foederati, or federated allies of Rome. In exchange for military service, they received land and a degree of self-government under their own leaders, although they remained nominally subordinate to the Roman emperor. Under kings Theodoric I (418–451) and Theodoric II (453–466), the Aquitanian Goths often served as allies of Rome—most notably in the Battle of the Catalaunian Plains (451) against Attila the Hun, but at times also fought against Rome, such as during the Gothic War(436–439).

When Euric came to power in 466, the Western Roman Empire was in rapid decline. The assassination of Emperor Majorian had triggered civil war, which had led to a further disintegration of the empire. In Italy the powerful general Ricimer effectively controlled imperial policy. Euric viewed this instability as an opportunity to consolidate Gothic power and achieve full independence from Rome. Euric exploited the situation and prepared to expand his realm across Gaul. His strategic aim was to unite all Gothic territories into a wide kingdom stretching from the Atlantic Ocean to the Rhône River, and from the Loire to Hispania.

== Prelude ==
Emperor Anthemius (467–472), who had fought as a general against the Goths in Pannonia, recognized the threat Euric posed and sought to build a coalition against him. With the Bretons, the Burgundians and Paulus, the successor of Aegidius in northern Gaul, he hoped to strengthen his position in Gaul with the regular army in Italy. South of the Pyrenees, the Suevens and the Roman provincials would also support him. However, the planned offensive against the Vandals required all his attention and resources.

== Outbreak of the revolt ==
The enormous defeat of the joint Roman fleet at Cape Bonn against the Vandals in 468 worked as a catalyst for Euric's war plans. Besides the morale effect of the lost war the diplomatic efforts of Anthemius failed: in Spain the Suebi, under Remismund, plundered Lusitania, and the Roman commander Lusidius surrendered Lisbon to them. Euric openly rebelled against the Roman Empire. Arvandus, the praetorian prefect of Gaul, had informed Euric of Anthemius’s strategy and advised him to divide Gaul with the Burgundians rather than make peace. Arvandus was later charged with high treason for this act. Euric responded swiftly, advancing his forces north into Gaul, where Roman defenses were divided. The imperial plans were further undermined by treachery.

== Course of the war ==
The army of Riothamus would be the first to experience the consequences of Arandus' betrayal. Following the call of Emperor Anthemius, Riothamus gathered 12,000 men in Armorica. This army, from which it is not really known whether the troops from Armorica or Britannia came, marched to the south of Gaul in the course of 469 to join Paul's Gallic army. Euric defeated the Romano-Breton army at Déols (modern Châteauroux). Riothamus’s force was routed, and the survivors fled to Burgundian territory. This victory allowed Euric to consolidate his control over central Gaul and push the Roman frontier north to the Loire River.

In middle Gaul, Roman forces under Paulus and Childeric stop the Goths at Bourges and briefly recaptured Tours in 470. The Goths now suffered a great defeat against the Roman army. All the loot they had stolen fell into the hands of Paul. Nevertheless continued the Gothic their offensive. Paulus was killed shortly afterwards in the Battle of Angers and in Italy Emperor Anthemius needed his troops to maintain his position against Ricimer. Neither party could beat the other and the area north of the Loire remains Roman while the south became Gothic.

== Battle of Arles ==
According to Sidonius Apollinaris, Euric then tried to conquer the Auvergne with Clermont-Ferrand as the main city. This area formed a wedge between his newly acquired territories and the Roman territory controlled by the Burgundians. In the spring of 471, Eurik again led his army against the Romans. He sent an army group towards the Auvergne to attack Clermont while he himself moved to Provence.

The Burgundian defence through Gondioc must have been insufficient or the emperor did not trust his magister militum per Gallias, because the emperor sent in response to Euric's attack an Imperial army to Gaul. This would be the last such force left Italy. Euric crossed the Rhone and destroyed the imperial army, whose commanders, including the emperor's son himself, were killed. This battle probably took place in the early summer of 471. After this victory, Visigothic forces overran southern Gaul, capturing Arles, Riez, Avignon, Orange, Apt, Valence, and Saint-Paul-Trois-Châteaux. The defeat prompted a change of track on Anthemius' part. Diplomacy led by a cousin of Sidonius led to halted Euric’s advance. During their retreat, the Aquitanian Goths devastated wide areas of the countryside.

== Aftermath ==
After the defeat of the Romans at Arles, Euric conquered the main cities and extended his authority over almost the entire province of Narbonensis. This victory strengthened his position in South and Middle Gaul considerably, mainly because Roman authority had largely collapsed. The loss of Gaul had far-reaching consequences for Emperor Anthemius. It led to a break with Ricimer and resulted in a civil war. In July 472, Ricimer besieged Rome, where Anthemius was. The emperor was captured and executed. At the same time, the Burgundy expanded their power to the Rhone Valley. Their king rex Gundioc made an agreement with Euric not to attack each other, allowing Euric to focus his attention on the Auvergne. Here, the Roman defense was led by Sidonius Apollinaris, Bishop of Clermont-Ferrand, and Ecidicus Avitus.

With the conquests in South and Central Gaul, Euric had achieved his main goal. He became de facto independent of Rome and showed this by drawing up his own laws (Codex Eurician). This was a clear sign that he no longer considered himself part of the Roman Empire. Shortly after he started a war in Spain and ended the Roman presence there.

== Bibliography ==
- Thompson, E.A. (1982). Romans and Barbarians: The Decline of the Western Empire. The University of Wisconsin Press. ISBN 029908700X.
- Wijnendaele, Jeroen W.P. (2024). De wereld van Clovis, de val van Rome en de geboorte van het westen [The World of Clovis, the Fall of Rome and the Birth of the West] (in Dutch). Ertsberg. ISBN 9789464984064.
- Wolfram, Herwig (1988). History of the Goths. Berkeley: University of California Press. ISBN 978-0-52005-259-8.
- Wood, Ian N. (2021), "The Making of the 'Burgundian Kingdom", Reti Medievali Journal, 22 (2): 111–140, doi:10.6093/1593-2214/7721, ISSN 1593-2214
