= Family tree of French monarchs =

Below are the family trees of all French monarchs (kings and emperors), from Childeric I to Napoleon III.

== Key ==
Unlike in some other family trees, siblings here are not listed in birth order.

- : The blue border indicates French monarchs.
- : The bolded border indicates legitimate children of monarchs.
- : The thin border indicates other relatives.

== Kings ==
Gunther d. 437; King of Burgundy	Chlodio c. 392/395– 445/448
? ? ?
**Merovingian**
Chilperic I King of Burgundy	Gondioc d. 473; King of Burgundy r. c. 437 – 473	? Merovech d. 453/457
? ? ?
Chilperic II c. 450–493; King of Burgundy	Bisinus fl.c. 460–506/510; King of Thuringia	Basina of Thuringia; 438–477	Childeric I 440–481/482; **King of the Salian Franks** **r. 457–481/482**	Godegisel d. c. 500	Godomar dates unknown	Gundobad c. 452–516; King of the Burgundians
Albofledis; 470–c. 500	Clotilde; 475–545	Clovis I 466–511; **King of the Franks** **r. 509–511**	? Evochildis of Cologne	Alaric II c. 458/466–507; King of the Visigoths	Audofleda c. 467 – c. 511	Theodoric; 454–526; King of the Ostrogoths	Lantechildis b. 468	Sigismund d. c. 524; King of the Burgundians
Bertachar c. 485–c. 530; King of Thuringia	Baderic c. 480–529; King of Thuringia	Ingomer; 494	Clotilde c. 500–531	Amalaric; 502–531; King of the Visigoths	Eustere c. 494–521	Theuderic I 485–533/534; King of Metz	Suavegothe of Burgundy b. c. 495/496
Radegund c. 520–587	Aregund c. 515/520–580	Chlothar I 497–561; **King of the Franks** **r. 558–561**	Ingund b. c. 499	Guntheuc; 495–c. 532	Chlodomer c. 495–524; King of Orléans	Childebert I c. 496–558; **King of Paris** **r. 511–558**	Ultragotha; 510; 566/567	Theudebert I c. 500–547/548; King of Rheims
Fredegund c. 545–597	Chilperic I c. 539–584; King of Neustria	Audovera c. 530–580	Charibert I c. 517–567; **King of Paris** **r. 561–567**	Ingoburga c. 539–589	Guntram c. 532–592; King of Burgundy	Chlothsind	Alboin; 530s–572 King of the Lombards	Theudebald c. 535–555; King of Rheims
Theudebert of Soissons	Basina c. 560–620	Bertha of Kent c. 565 – c. 601	Æthelberht c. 560–616; King of Kent	Sigebert I King of Austrasia c. 535-c. 575	Brunhilda of Austrasia c. 543–613
Rigunth c. 569– after 589	Haldetrude c. 575–604	Chlothar II; 584–629; **King of the Franks** **r. 613–629**	Sichilde c. 590–627	Hermenegild; 564–585	Ingund; 568/567–585	Childebert II; 570–595; King of Austrasia
**Pippinid**
Ragnetrude	Dagobert I c. 603–639; **King of the Franks** **r. 629–634**	Nanthild c. 610–642	Charibert II; 607/617–632; King of Aquitaine	Arnulf c. 582–640; Bishop of Metz	Pepin of Landen c. 580–640; Mayor of Austrasia	Theudebert II; 586–612; King of Austrasia	Theuderic II; 587–613; King of Burgundy
Chimnechild of Burgundy	Sigebert III c. 630–656/660; King of Austrasia	Clovis II; 637–657/658; King of Neustria and Burgundy	Balthild of Ascania c. 626–680	Chilperic; 630s–632 King of Aquitaine	Ansegisel c. 602/610– bef.679/662	Begga; 615–693	Grimoald the Elder; 616–657; Mayor of Austrasia	Sigebert II; 602–613; King of Austrasia and Burgundy
Dagobert II c. 650–679; King of Austrasia	Bilichild; 654–675	Childeric II c. 653–675; **King of the Franks** **r. 673–675**	Chlothar III; 652—736; **King of the Franks** **r. 661–662**	Theuderic III; 654–691; **King of the Franks** **r. 679–691**	Clotilda	Pepin of Herstal c. 635–714; Mayor of Austrasia	Childebert the Adopted; King of Austrasia
? ? ?
Chilperic II c. 672–721; **King of the Franks** **r. 715–717**	Clovis III; King of Austrasia	Chlothar IV d. 719; King of Austrasia	Childebert III; 670/683–711; **King of the Franks** **r. 695–711**	Clovis IV; 682–695; **King of the Franks** **r. 691–695**	Grimoald II the Younger c. 680–714; Mayor of Neustria
**Carolingian**
? ? ?	Dagobert III; 699–715; **King of the Franks** **r. 711–715**	Swanachild	Charles Martel c. 686/680–741; Mayor of the Palace of Austrasia	Rotrude of Trier d. 724	Theudoald; 707/708–741; Mayor of Austrasia
Childeric III c. 717–754; **King of the Franks** **r. 743–751**	Theuderic IV c. 712–737; **King of the Franks** **r. 721–737**
Grifo; 726–753	Odilo c. 700–748; Duke of Bavaria	Hiltrud of Bavaria d. 754	Carloman btw.706/716–754 Mayor	Pepin the Short c. 714–768; **King of the Franks** **r. 751–768**	Bertrada of Laon btw.710/727–783	Auda; 732 –_{bef.}755?	Thierry IV c. 720–782; Count of Autun
Gerberga	Carloman I 751–771; **King of the Franks** **r. 768–771**	Gisela; 757–810; Abbess of Chelles
Ethelind	Fastrada; 765–794	Himiltrude c. 742–c. 780	Hildegard of the Vinzgau; 758–783	Charlemagne; 742/748–814; **King of the Franks** **r. 768–814**	Desiderata of the Lombards	Regina	Luitgard d. 800
Richbod; 805–844; Abbott of Saint-Riquier	Theodoric b. 807	Pepin the Hunchback c. 767–811	Theodrada c. 784–844/853	Hiltrude b. 787	Drogo of Metz; 801–855; Bishop of Metz	Hugh; 802–844
Charles the Younger c. 772–811; **King of the Franks** **r. 800–811**	Rotrude; 775/778–810	Bertha fl.c. 800	Gisela; 781–808	Pepin of Italy; 770/733–810; King of the Lombards	Ermengarde of Hesbaye c. 778–818	Louis I the Pious; 778–840; **King of the Franks** **r. 814–840**	Judith of Bavaria; 797/805–843
Ingeltrude of Madrie	Pepin I 797–838; King of Aquitaine	Rotrude b. 800	Hildegard b. c. 802	Adelaide b. c. 799	Arnulf of Sens	Alpais
Hemma of Bavaria; 803/808–876	Louis II the German c. 810–876; King of East Francia	Ermengarde of Tours d. 851	Lothair I 795–855; King of Middle Francia, Holy Roman Emperor	Ermentrude of Orléans; 823–869	Charles II the Bald; 823–877; **King of the Franks** **r. 840–877**	Richilde of Provence c. 845–910	Gisela b. 821	Eberhard c. 815–866; Duke of Friuli
Richardis c. 840 – c. 894/896	Charles III the Fat; 839–888; **King of the Franks** **r. 884–888**	Baldwin I d. 879; Margrave of Flanders	Judith of Flanders c. 843–c. 870	Lothair the Lame c. 848–865	Carloman; 848 –c. 877	Hugues Count of Bourges c. 798–853	Rothilde; 871–928/929	Roger; Count de Maine; 886–893; 895–900
Robert IV the Strong c. 830–866; Margrave in Neustria	Ansgarde of Burgundy d. 880/882	Louis II the Stammerer; 846–879; **King of the Franks** **r. 877–879**	Adelaide of Paris c. 850/853–901	Charles the Child; 847/848–866; King of Aquitaine
**Robertian**	Hildegarde b. 864	Gisela; 865–884	Louis III; 863/865–882; **King of the Franks** **r. 879–882**	Carloman II c. 866–884; **King of the Franks** **r. 879–884**	Ermentrude; 875–914	Frederuna; 887–917	Charles III the Simple; 879–929; **King of the Franks** **r. 898–922**	Eadgifu of Wessex; 902– after 955
Odo c. 852–898; **King of the Franks** **r. 887–898**	Théodrate of Troyes	Aelis	Robert I 866–923; **King of the Franks** **r. 922–923**	Béatrice (Note: Béatrice of Vermandois was a great-great-great granddaughter of Charlemagne through her father.) of Vermandois c. 880– after 931	Ermentrude	Frederuna	Adelaide	Rotrude	Hildegarde
Arnulf	Guy	Henry I (Note: Henry the Fowler was a great-great-grandson of Charlemagne through his mother.) the Fowler; 876–936; Duke of Saxony; King of East Francia/Germany
**Bosonid**
Rudolph c. 880/890–936; **King of the Franks** **r. 923–936**	Emma d. 934	daughter name unknown	Herbert II; Count of Vermandois d. 943	Hugh the Great; 898–956; Duke of the Franks	Hedwig of Saxony c. 910–965	Otto I 912–973; Holy Roman Emperor	Gerberga of Saxony c. 913–968/ 969/984?	Louis IV; 920–954; **King of the Franks** **r. 936–954**
**Capetian**
Adelaide c. 945 /952–1004	Hugh Capet c. 941–996; **King of the Franks** **r. 987–996**	Otto; 944–965; Duke of Burgundy	Henry I 946–1002; Duke of Burgundy	Charles; 945–953	Henry; 953–953	Emma of Italy c. 948–after 987	Lothair; 941–986; **King of the Franks** **r. 954–986**	Matilda; 943–992	Conrad I 925–993; King of Burgundy	Charles; 953–993; Duke of Lower Lorraine	Louis; 948–954
Gisela c. 968–1002	Hugh I c. 970 – c. 1000; Count of Ponthieu	Hedwig c. 970–_{aft.}1013	Reginar IV c. 950–1013; Count of Mons	Robert II; 972–1031; **King of the Franks** **r. 996–1031**	Constance of Arles c. 986–1032	Louis V c. 967–987; **King of the Franks** **r. 986–987**	Otto; Canon of Reims c. 970–bef. 986	Arnulf; 988–1021; Archbishop of Reims	Richard d. aft. 991	Ermengarde m Albert I House of Namur	Otto c. 970–1012; Duke of Lower Lorraine
Renauld I ≤1005–1040; Count of Nevers	Hedwig c. 1003–1063; Countess of Auxerre	Hugh Magnus; 1007–1025; Co-**King of the Franks** **r. 1017–1025**	Matilda of Frisia d. 1044	Henry I 1008–1060; **King of the Franks** **r. 1031–1060**	Anne of Kiev c. 1030–1075	Helie of Semur	Robert I 1011–1076; Duke of Burgundy	Ermengarde of Anjou c. 1018–1076	Richard III; 997/1001–1027; Duke of Normandy	Adèle; 1009–1079; Countess of Flanders	Baldwin V 1012–1067; Count of Flanders
Bertha of Holland; 1055–1093	Philip I 1052–1108; **King of the Franks** **r. 1060–1108**	Bertrade de Montfort c. 1070–1117	Hugh I 1057–1101; Count of Vermandois	Adelaide d. 1120/1124; Countess of Vermandois
Hugh; 1074–1125; Count of Champagne	Constance; 1078–1126; Princess of Antioch	Bohemond I of Antioch c. 1058–1111	Lucienne de Rochefort; 1088–_{aft.}1137	Louis VI; 1081–1137; **King of the Franks** **r. 1108–1137**	Adelaide of Maurienne; 1092–1154	Philip fl.1123 Count of Mantes	Elisabeth of Montlhery d. 1141	Fleury; 1093–1119; Seigneur of Nangis	Tancred; 1075–1112; Prince of Galilee	Cecile; 1097–_{aft.}1145	Pons; 1098–1137; Count of Tripoli
Theobald II; 1090–1152; Count of Champagne	Agnes de Garlande; 1122–1143	Hawise of Salisbury; 1118–1152	Robert I c. 1123–1188; Count of Dreux	Agnes de Baudemont; 1130–c. 1202; Countess of Braine	Eustace IV; 1129–1153; Count of Boulogne	Constance; 1124–1176; Countess of Toulouse	Raymond V c. 1134–1194; Count of Toulouse	Peter I of Courtenay; 1126–1183	Elizabeth de Courtenay c. 1127–1205
Eleanor c. 1123–1204; Duchess of Aquitaine	Adela of Champagne c. 1140–1206	Louis VII; 1120–1180; **King of the Franks** **r. 1137–1180**	Constance of Castile; 1140–1160	Philip; 1125–1161; Archdeacon of Paris	Henry; 1121–1175; Archbishop of Reims	Philip; 1116–1131; Co-**King of the Franks**	Robert I (1123–1188); Count of Dreux
Henry I 1127–1181; Count of Champagne	Marie; 1145–1198; Countess of Champagne	Alice; 1150–1197 /1198	Theobald V 1130–1191; Count of Blois	Henry; 1155–1183; Co-King of England	Margaret; 1157–1197	Béla III c. 1148–1196; King of Hungary	Alys; 1160–c. 1220; Countess of Vexin	William IV; 1179–1221; Count of Ponthieu
Ingeborg of Denmark; 1175–1236	Isabella of Hainault; 1170–1190	Philip II; Augustus; 1165–1223; **King of France** **r. 1180–1223**	Agnes of Merania d. 1201	Alexios II; Byzantine Emperor; 1169–1183	Agnes; 1171–_{aft.}1204	Andronikos I Komnenos; Byzantine Emperor c. 1118–1185	Theodore Branas
Ramon Berenguer IV; 1198–1245; Count of Provence	Louis VIII; 1187–1226; **King of France** **r. 1223–1226**	Blanche of Castile; 1188–1252	Philip I 1201–1235; Count of Boulogne	Matilda II; 1202–1260; Countess of Boulogne	Henry I 1165–1235; Duke of Brabant	Marie; 1198–1224; Duchess of Brabant	Philip I 1175–1212; Margrave of Namur
Henry II; 1207–1248; Duke of Brabant	Theobald I 1201–1253; King of Navarre
Margaret of Provence; 1221–1295	Louis IX; 1214–1270; **King of France** **r. 1226–1270**	Beatrice of Provence c. 1231–1267	Charles I of Anjou; 1227–1285; King of Naples	Margaret of Burgundy; 1250–1308	Alphonse; 1220–1271; Count of Poitiers	Robert I 1216–1250; Count of Artois	Matilda of Brabant; 1224–1288	Henry III c. 1230–1261; Duke of Brabant
Louis; 1244–1260	John Tristan; 1250–1270; Count of Valois	Yolande II; 1247–1280; Countess of Nevers	Blanche; 1253–1323	Fernando de la Cerda; 1255–1275	Peter; 1251–1284; Count of Perche and Alençon	Joan c. 1253–1291; Countess of Blois	Isabelle; 1224–1270	Isabella; 1241–1271	Theobald II; 1239–1270; King of Navarre	Henry I the Fat c. 1244–1274; King of Navarre
Robert II; 1248–1306; Duke of Burgundy	Agnes; 1260–1327	Isabella of Aragon; 1248–1271	Philip III; 1245–1285; **King of France** **r. 1270–1285**	Marie of Brabant; 1254–1321	John I c. 1252–1294; Duke of Brabant	Margaret; 1254–1271
**Bourbon**
Beatrice of Burgundy; 1257–1310; Lady of Bourbon	Robert; 1256–1317; Count of Clermont	Blanche c. 1278–1305	Rudolf I c. 1281–1307; King of Bohemia	Louis; 1276–1319; Count of Évreux	Margaret of Artois; 1285–1311	Margaret c. 1279–1318	Edward I 1239–1307; King of England
Louis I 1279–1341; Duke of Bourbon	Mahaut of Châtillon; 1293–1358	Margaret; 1273–1299; Countess of Anjou	Charles; 1270–1325; Count of Valois	Catherine I 1274–1307; Latin Empress	Louis c. 1264 – c. 1276	Philip IV; 1268–1314; **King of France** **r. 1285–1314**	Joan I 1273–1305; Queen of Navarre
Peter I 1311-1356; Duke of Bourbon	Margaret of Burgundy; 1290–1315	Louis X 1289–1316; **King of France** **r. 1314–1316**	Clementia of Hungary; 1293–1328	Philip V c. 1293–1322; **King of France** **r. 1316–1322**	Joan II; 1292–1330; Countess of Burgundy	Charles IV; 1294–1328; **King of France** **r. 1322–1328**	Joan of Évreux; 1310–1371	Isabella; 1295–1358	Edward II; 1284–1327; King of England
James I 1319–1362; Count of La Marche	Philip III; 1306–1343; King of Navarre	Joan II; 1312–1349; Queen of Navarre	John I the Posthumous; 1316–1316; **King of France** **r. 1316**	Edward III; 1312–1377; King of England
Guigues VIII; 1309–1333; Dauphin of Vienne	Isabella c. 1312–1348	Margaret I 1310–1382; Countess of Burgundy	Louis I c. 1304–1346; Count of Flanders	Joan III; 1308–1349; Countess of Burgundy	Odo IV; 1295–1350; Duke of Burgundy	Blanche; 1313–1358
**Valois**
Blanche of Navarre; 1330–1398	Philip VI the Fortunate, the Catholic; 1293–1350; **King of France** **r. 1328–1350**	Joan the Lame, of Burgundy c. 1293–1348	Joan of Valois; 1294–1342	Margaret of Valois; 1295–1342	Charles II the Magnanimous; 1297–1346; Count of Alençon
Joan; Blanche; 1351–1371	Bonne of Luxembourg; 1315–1349	John II; 1319–1364; **King of France** **r. 1350–1364**	Joan I 1326–1360; Countess of Auvergne	Marie; 1326–1333	Philip b. 1315	Joan b. 1317	Philip; 1336–1376; Duke of Orléans and Touraine, Count of Valois	Blanche; 1328–1382
Louis II; 1337-1410; Duke of Bourbon	Marie of Blois; 1345–1404	Louis I 1339–1384; Duke of Anjou	Charles II; 1332–1387; King of Navarre	Joan of Valois; 1343–1373	Agnes; 1345–1350	Margaret; 1347–1352	Margaret III; 1350–1405; Countess of Flanders	Philip II the Bold; 1342–1404; Duke of Burgundy	Marie; 1344–1404	Robert I 1344–1411; Duke of Bar
John I of Bourbon; 1344–1393; Count of La Marche	Gian Visconti; 1351–1402; Duke of Milan	Isabella; 1348–1373; Countess of Vertus	Joan II; 1378–1424; Countess of Auvergne	John; 1340–1416; Duke of Berry	Joan of Armagnac; 1346–1387	Charles V 1338–1380; **King of France** **r. 1364–1380**	Joanna of Bourbon; 1338–1378	John I the Fearless; 1371–1419; Duke of Burgundy
**Valois-Orléans**
Valentina Visconti of Vertus; 1389–1408	Louis I 1372–1407; Duke of Orléans	John I 1381-1434; Duke of Bourbon	John; 1363–1401; Count of Montpensier	Catherine; 1378–1388	Jeanne; 1357–1360	John; 1359–1364	Charles VI; 1368–1422; **King of France** **r. 1380–1422**	Isabeau of Bavaria; 1370–1435	Marie; 1370–1377	Isabelle; 1373–1377
Louis of Bourbon; 1376–1446; Count of Vendôme	Richard II; 1367–1400; King of England	Isabella of Valois; 1389–1409	Joan; 1391–1433	John VI; 1389–1442; Duke of Brittany	Marie; 1393–1438; Prioress of Poissy	Louis; 1397–1415; Dauphin of France	Margaret of Burgundy; 1393–1442	Michelle of Valois; 1395–1422	Philip III the Good; 1396–1467; Duke of Burgundy
John VIII of Bourbon; 1425–1477; Count of Vendôme	Jacqueline; 1401–1436; Countess of Hainaut	John; 1398–1417; Dauphin of France	Henry V 1387–1422; King of England	Catherine of Valois; 1401–1437	Owen Tudor c. 1400–1461	Charles VII; 1403–1461; **King of France** **r. 1422–1461**	Marie of Anjou; 1404–1463
Radegonde aft. 1428– 1444	Charles I 1401–1456; Duke of Bourbon	Henry VI; 1421–1471; King of England	James; 1432–1437	Margaret; 1437–1438	Joanna; 1438–1446	Charles of Valois; 1446–1472; Duke of Berry	Catherine; 1428–1446; Countess of Charolais	Charles the Bold; 1433–1477; Duke of Burgundy	Louis I 1413–1465; Duke of Savoy
Gaston; 1444–1470; Prince of Viana	Magdalena of Valois; 1443–1495	John II; 1426–1488; Duke of Bourbon	Joan; 1435–1482	Margaret Stewart; 1424–1445	Louis XI; 1423–1483; **King of France** **r. 1461–1483**	Charlotte of Savoy; 1441–1483	Amadeus IX; 1435–1472; Duke of Savoy	Yolande of Valois; 1434–1478
Francis of Bourbon; 1470–1495; Count of Vendôme	Catherine; 1468–1517; Queen of Navarre	**Valois-Angoulême**	Louis II of Bourbon; 1450–1487; Count of Roussillon	Jeanne de Valois; 1447–1519	Peter II; 1438–1503; Duke of Bourbon	Anne; 1461–1522	Louis; 1458–1460	Joachim; 1459	Louise; 1460
Charles of Bourbon; 1489–1537; Duke of Vendôme	John; 1399–1467; Count of Angoulême	Charles; 1394–1465; Duke of Orléans
Louis I 1530-1569; Prince of Condé	Charles; 1459–1496; Count of Angoulême	Louise of Savoy; 1476–1531	Marie of Orléans; 1457–1493	Mary Tudor; 1496–1533	Louis XII; 1462–1515; **King of France** **r. 1498–1515**	Joan; 1464–1505; Duchess of Berry	Anne; 1477–1514; Duchess of Brittany	Charles VIII; 1470–1498; **King of France** **r. 1483–1498**	Francis; 1472–1473; Duke of Berry
Henry I 1552-1588; Prince of Condé	Henry II; 1503–1555; King of Navarre	Marguerite de Navarre; 1492–1549	Eleanor of Austria; 1498–1558	Francis I 1494–1547; **King of France** **r. 1515–1547**	Claude; 1499–1524; Duchess of Brittany	Renée; 1510–1574	Ercole II d'Este; 1508–1559; Duke of Ferrara	Charles Orlando; 1492–1495; Dauphin of France	Charles; 1496; Dauphin of France	François; 1497; Dauphin of France
Antoine of Bourbon; 1518–1562; King of Navarre jure uxoris	Jeanne III d'Albret; 1528–1572; Queen of Navarre	James V 1512–1542; King of Scots	Madeleine of Valois; 1520–1537	Charlotte; 1516–1524	Francis III; 1518–1536; Dauphin of France; Duke of Brittany	Catherine de' Medici; 1519–1589	Henry II; 1519–1559; **King of France** **r. 1547–1559**	Charles II de Valois; 1522–1545; Duke of Orléans	Margaret; 1523–1574; Duchess of Berry	Emmanuel Philibert; 1528–1580; Duke of Savoy
Henri II; 1588-1646; Prince of Condé	Mary Stuart; 1542–1587; Queen of Scots	Francis II; 1544–1560; **King of France** **r. 1559–1560**	Claude; 1547–1575	Charles III; 1543–1608; Duke of Lorraine	Louis; 1549–1550; Duke of Orléans	Charles IX; 1550–1574; **King of France** **r. 1560–1574**	Elisabeth of Austria; 1554–1592	Henry III; 1551–1589; **King of France** **r. 1574–1589**	Louise of Lorraine; 1553–1601
**Bourbon**
Marie de' Medici; 1575–1642	Henry IV; 1553–1610; **King of Navarre and France** **r. 1589–1610**	Margaret; 1553–1615	Catherine of Bourbon; 1559–1604	Henry II; 1563–1624; Duke of Lorraine	Philip II; 1527–1598; King of England, Spain, and Portugal	Elisabeth of Valois; 1545–1568	Francis; 1555–1584; Duke of Anjou	Charles; 1573–1650; Duke of Angoulême	Marie Elisabeth; 1572–1578
Victor Amadeus I 1587–1637; Duke of Savoy	Christine; 1606–1663	Marie; 1605–1627; Duchess of Montpensier	Gaston; 1608–1660; Duke of Orléans	Marguerite of Lorraine; 1615–1672	Philip III; The Pious; 1578–1621; King of Naples, Portugal, Sardinia, Sicily, and Spain	Armand; Prince of Conti; 1629-1666	Louis II; 1621-1686; Prince of Condé
Louis XIII; 1601–1643; **King of France** **r. 1610–1643**	Anne of Austria; 1601–1666	Elisabeth; 1602–1644	Philip IV; The Great; 1605–1665; King of Naples, Portugal, Sardinia, Sicily, and Spain	Nicolas Henri; 1607–1611; Duke of Orléans	Henry Jules; 1640-1709; Prince of Condé	Henrietta Maria; 1609–1669	Charles I 1600–1649; King of England, Scotland, and Ireland
**Orléans**
Maria Theresa of Spain; 1638–1683	Louis XIV; 1638–1715; **King of France** **r. 1643–1715**	Françoise of Aubigné; 1635–1719; Marquise de Maintenon	Elizabeth Charlotte; 1652–1722; Princess Palatine	Philippe I 1640–1701; Duke of Orléans	Henrietta of England; 1644–1670
Louis Auguste; 1670–1736; Duke of Maine	Louise Bénédicte de Bourbon; 1676–1753	Louis; 1667–1683; Count of Vermandois	Charles II; 1665-1700; King of Spain	Marie Louise of Orléans; 1662–1689	Anne Marie of Orléans; 1669–1728; Queen of Sardinia
Louise de Maison-blanche; 1676–1718	Marie Anne de Bourbon; 1666–1739	Louis Armand I 1661-1685; Prince of Conti	François Louis; 1661–1685; Prince of Conti	Louis III; 1668–1710; Prince of Condé, Duke of Bourbon	Louise Françoise of Bourbon; 1673–1743	Françoise Marie de Bourbon; 1677–1749	Philippe II; 1674–1723; Duke of Orléans
Marie Thérèse; 1667–1672	Maria Anna of Bavaria; 1660–1690	Louis; 1661–1711 "Grand Dauphin" of France	Marie Émilie de Joly de Choin; 1670–1732	Louis Armand II; 1695–1727; Prince of Conti	Louise Élisabeth de Bourbon; 1693–1775
Marie Adélaïde of Savoy; 1685–1712	Louis; 1682–1712; Duke of Burgundy, Dauphin of France	Philip V 1683–1746; King of Naples, Sardinia, and Spain	Charles; 1686–1714; Duke of Berry	Marie Louise of Orléans; 1695–1719	Louis; 1703–1752; Duke of Orléans
Louis; 1707–1712; Duke of Brittany, Dauphin of France	Louis XV; 1710–1774; **King of France** **r. 1715–1774**	Marie Leszczyńska; 1703–1768	Louis Alexandre; 1678–1737; Count of Toulouse	Marie Victoire de Noailles; 1688–1766	Louise Élisabeth of Orleans; 1709–1742	Louise Diane of Orléans; 1716–1736	Louis François; 1717–1776; Prince of Conti	Louise Henriette of Bourbon; 1726–1759	Louis Philippe I 1725–1785; Duke of Orléans
Henriette; 1727–1752	Marie Louise Élisabeth; 1727–1759	Philip; 1720–1765; Duke of Parma	Maria Teresa of Spain; 1726–1746	Louis; 1729–1765; Dauphin of France	Maria Josepha of Saxony; 1731–1767	Madame Adélaïde; 1732–1800	Victoire; 1733–1799	Sophie Philippine Élisabeth Justine; 1734–1782	Louise Marie; 1737–1787
Marie Zéphyrine; 1750–1755	Louis Joseph; 1751–1761; Duke of Burgundy	Xavier Marie Joseph; 1753–1754; Duke of Aquitaine	Élisabeth; 1764–1794	Victor Amadeus III; 1726–1796; King of Sardinia	Louis Jean Marie; 1725-1793; Duke of Penthièvre
Marie Antoinette; 1755–1793	Louis XVI; 1754–1793; **King of France** **r. 1774–1792**	Louis XVIII; 1755–1824; **King of France** **r. 1815–1824**	Marie Joséphine of Savoy; 1753–1810	Charles X 1757–1836; **King of France** **r. 1824–1830**	Maria Theresa of Savoy; 1756–1805	Clotilde; 1759–1802	Charles Emmanuel IV; 1751–1819; King of Sardinia	Louise de Bourbon; 1753–1821	Louis Philippe II; 1747–1793; Duke of Orléans	Bathilde of Orléans; 1750–1822	Louis Henri; 1756–1830; Prince of Condé, Duke of Bourbon
**Orléans**
Louis Joseph; 1781–1789; Dauphin of France	Louis XVII; 1785–1795; **King of France** (Claimant)	Marie Thérèse; 1778–1851	Louis Antoine; 1775–1844; Duke of Angoulême, Dauphin of France	Charles Ferdinand; 1778–1820; Duke of Berry	Marie Caroline of the Two Sicilies; 1798–1870	Sophie of Artois; 1776–1783	Maria Amalia of Naples and Sicily; 1782–1866	Louis Philippe I 1773–1850; **King of the French** **r. 1830–1848**	Antoine Philippe; 1775–1807; Duke of Montpensier	Adélaïde of Orléans; 1777–1847	Louis Charles; 1779–1808; Count of Beaujolais
Ferdinand Philippe; 1810–1842; Duke of Orléans	Helene of Mecklenburg-Schwerin; 1814–1858	Louise of Orléans; 1812–1850	Leopold I 1790–1865; King of the Belgians	Marie of Orléans; 1813–1839	Alexander of Württemberg; 1804–1881	Louis; 1814–1896; Duke of Nemours	Victoria of Saxe-Coburg and Gotha; 1822–1857	Ferdinand VII; 1784–1833; King of Spain
Henri; 1820–1883; Count of Chambord and Duke of Bordeaux (**King of France** Claimant)	Clémentine of Orléans; 1817–1907	August of Saxe-Coburg and Gotha; 1818–1881	François; 1818–1900; Prince of Joinville	Francisca of Brazil; 1824–1898	Charles; 1820–1828; Duke of Penthièvre	Henri; 1822–1897; Duke of Aumale	Maria Carolina of Bourbon-Two Sicilies; 1822–1869	Antoine; 1824–1890; Duke of Montpensier	Luisa; 1832–1897; Duchess of Montpensier

== Emperors ==
**Bonaparte**
Marie Louise; 1791–1847; Duchess of Parma	Napoleon I 1769–1821; Emperor of the French **r. 1804–1814, 1815**
Napoleon II; 1811–1832; Emperor of the French **r. 1815 (disputed)**

Carlo Buonaparte; 1746–1785	Letizia Ramolino; 1750–1836
Joséphine de Beauharnais; 1763–1814	Alexandre de Beauharnais; 1760–1794	Louis Bonaparte; 1778–1846; King of Holland
Hortense de Beauharnais; 1783–1837
Napoleon III; 1808–1873; Emperor of the French **r. 1852–1870**	Eugénie de Montijo; 1826–1920
Napoléon; Prince Imperial; 1856–1879

== See also ==
- Family tree of French monarchs (simplified)
- Kingdom of France
- List of French monarchs
- List of French consorts
- List of heirs to the French throne
- Family tree of German monarchs
