= Constance of Castile, Queen of France =

Queen of the Franks from 1154 to 1160

Constance of Castile
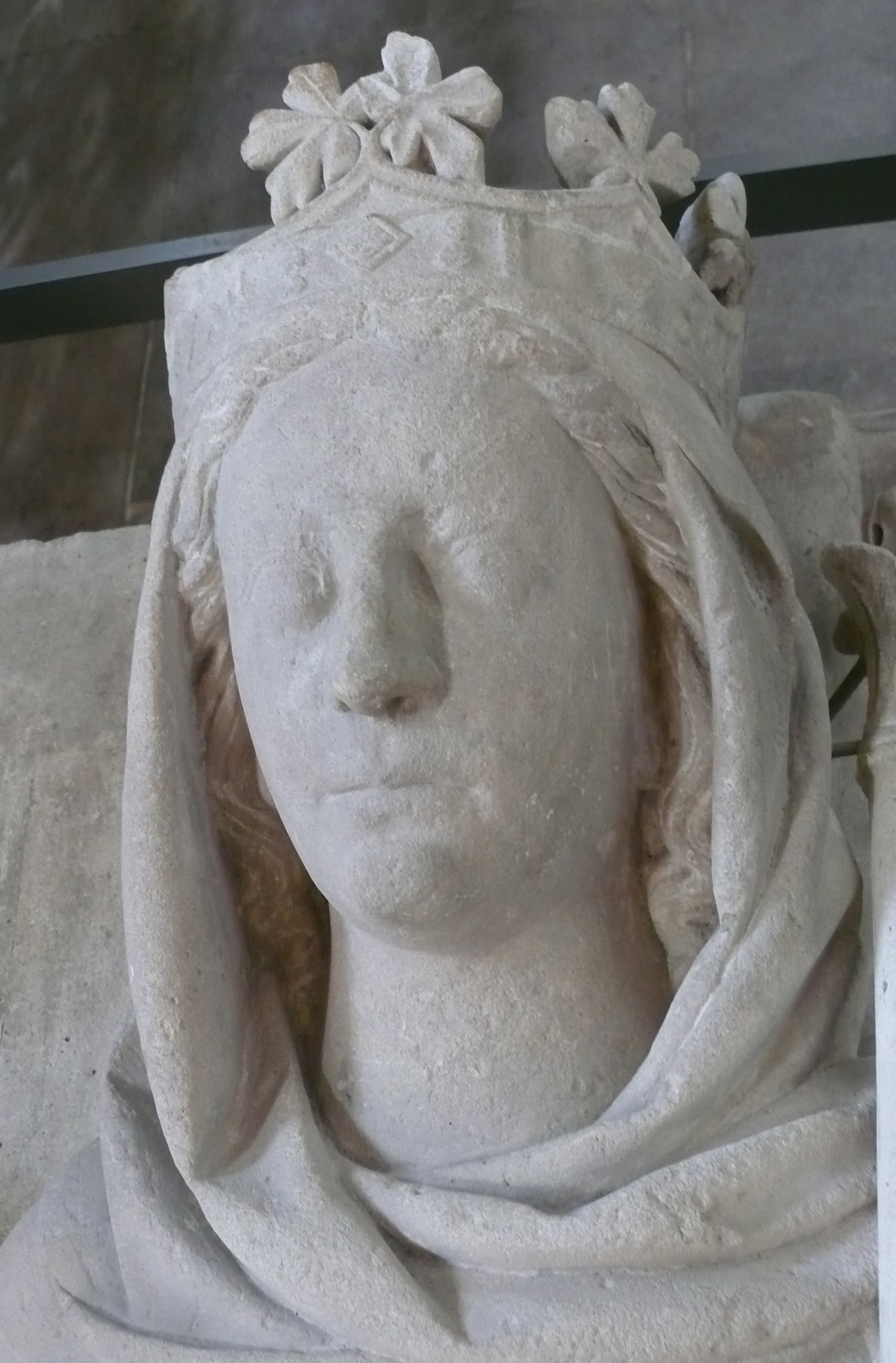
- Effigy at Basilica of Saint-Denis

Queen consort of the Franks
- Tenure: 1154 – 4 October 1160
- Coronation: 1154
- Born: 1136–1140
- Died: 4 October 1160 (aged 19–24)
- Burial: Basilica of St Denis
- Spouse: Louis VII of France (m. 1154)
- Issue: Margaret, Queen of England and Hungary; Alys, Countess of Vexin
- House: Castilian House of Ivrea
- Father: Alfonso VII of León and Castile
- Mother: Berenguela of Barcelona

Constance of Castile (1136 or 1140 – 4 October 1160) was Queen of France as the second wife of Louis VII, who married her following the annulment of his marriage to Eleanor of Aquitaine. She was a daughter of Alfonso VII of León and Berengaria of Barcelona, but her year of birth is not known.

== Life ==
The official reason for her husband's annulment from Eleanor of Aquitaine had been that he was too close a relative of Eleanor for the marriage to be legal by Church standards; however, he was even more closely related to Constance. They were second cousins through William I, Count of Burgundy.

Constance died giving birth to her second child. Desperate for a son, her husband remarried a mere five weeks after her death.

Constance was buried in the Basilica of Saint-Denis, Paris.

== Children ==
Constance had two children:

1. Margaret, 1157–1197, who married first Henry the Young King of England, and then Béla III of Hungary
2. Alys, 1160–1220, who married William IV of Ponthieu

== Sources ==
- Bouchard, Constance (2001). Those of My Blood: Creating Noble Families in Medieval Francia. University of Pennsylvania Press.
- Bradbury, Jim (2007). The Capetians. Hambledon Continuum.
- Jaritz, Gerhard; Szende, Katalin, eds. (2016). Medieval East Central Europe in a Comparative Perspective. Routledge.
- Warren, W. L. (1978). King John. University of California Press.

Constance of Castile, Queen of France Castilian House of Ivrea Cadet branch of the House of Ivrea Born: 1136–1140 Died: 4 October 1160
French royalty
Vacant Title last held by Eleanor of Aquitaine	Queen consort of France; 1154–1160	Vacant Title next held by Adela of Champagne
