= Louis VII of France =

King of the Franks from 1137 to 1180

Louis VII
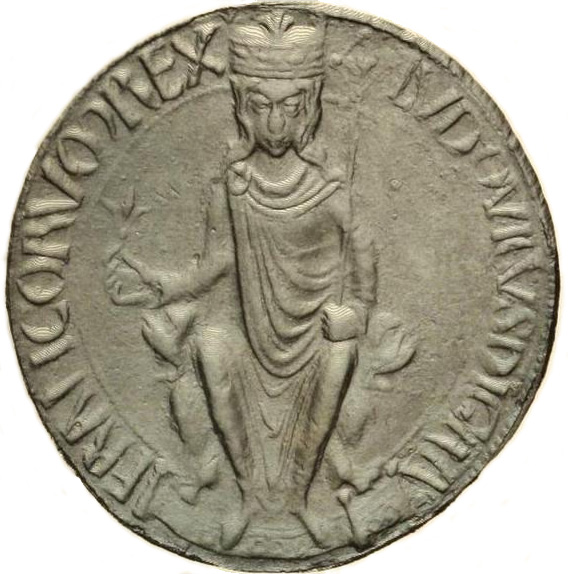
- Effigy of Louis VII on his seal

King of the Franks
- Reign: 1 August 1137 – 18 September 1180
- Coronation: 25 October 1131, Reims; 25 December 1137, Bourges
- Predecessor: Louis VI
- Successor: Philip II
- Born: 1120
- Died: 18 September 1180 (aged 59–60); Paris
- Burial: Barbeau Abbey, then (1817) Saint-Denis Basilica
- Spouses: Eleanor of Aquitaine (m. 1137; ann. 1152) Constance of Castile (m. 1154; died 1160) Adela of Champagne (m. 1160)
- Issue Detail: Marie, Countess of Champagne; Alix, Countess of Blois; Margaret, Queen of England and Hungary; Alys, Countess of Vexin; Philip II, King of France; Agnes, Byzantine Empress
- House: Capet
- Father: Louis VI of France
- Mother: Adelaide of Maurienne

Louis VII (1120 – 18 September 1180), was King of France from 1137 to 1180. His first marriage was to Duchess Eleanor of Aquitaine, one of the wealthiest and most powerful women in western Europe. The marriage temporarily extended the Capetian lands to the Pyrenees.

Louis was the second son of Louis VI of France and Adelaide of Maurienne, and was initially prepared for a career in the Church. Following the death of his older brother, Philip, in 1131, Louis became heir apparent to the French throne and was crowned as his father's co-ruler. In 1137, he married Eleanor of Aquitaine and shortly thereafter became sole king following his father's death. During his march, as part of the Second Crusade in 1147, Louis stayed at the court of King Géza II of Hungary on the way to Jerusalem. During his stay in the Holy Land, disagreements with Eleanor led to a deterioration in their marriage. She persuaded him to stay in Antioch but Louis instead wanted to fulfil his vows of pilgrimage to Jerusalem. He was later involved in the failed siege of Damascus and eventually returned to France in 1149. Louis's reign saw the founding of the University of Paris. He and his counsellor, Abbot Suger, pushed for greater centralisation of the state and favoured the development of French Gothic architecture, notably the construction of Notre-Dame de Paris.

Louis's marriage to Eleanor was annulled in 1152 after the couple had produced two daughters, but no male heir. Immediately after their annulment, Eleanor married Henry, Duke of Normandy and Count of Anjou, to whom she conveyed Aquitaine. Following Henry's accession as King Henry II of England, these territories formed the Angevin Empire. Later, Louis supported Henry and Eleanor's sons in their rebellion against their father to foment further disunity in the Angevin realms. His second marriage to Constance of Castile also produced two daughters, but his third wife, Adela of Champagne, gave birth to a son, Philip Augustus, in 1165. Louis died in 1180 and was succeeded by his son, Philip II.

== Early life and education ==
Louis was born in 1120, the second son of Louis VI of France and Adelaide of Maurienne. The early education of the young Louis anticipated an ecclesiastical career. As a result, he became well learned and exceptionally devout, but his life course changed decisively after the accidental death of his older brother Philip in 1131, when Louis unexpectedly became the heir to the throne of France. In October 1131, his father had him anointed and crowned by Pope Innocent II in Reims Cathedral. He spent much of his youth in Saint-Denis, where he built a friendship with the abbot Suger, an advisor to his father who also served Louis during his early years as king.

== Early reign ==
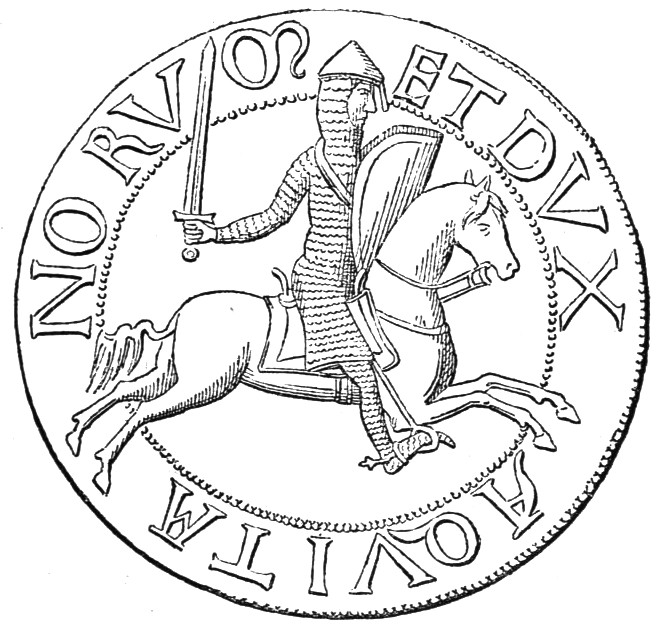
Equestrian image of Louis VII on two-sided royal seal. Legend: ET DVX AQVITANORVM.

Following the death of Duke William X of Aquitaine, Louis VI moved quickly to have his son married to Eleanor of Aquitaine (who had inherited William's territory) on 25 July 1137. In this way, Louis VI sought to add the large, sprawling territory of the duchy of Aquitaine to his family's holdings in France. On 1 August 1137, shortly after the marriage, Louis VI died, and Louis became king. The pairing of the monkish Louis and the high-spirited Eleanor was doomed to failure; she reportedly once declared that she had thought to marry a king, only to find she had married a monk. There was a marked difference between the frosty, reserved culture of the northern court in the Île-de-France, where Louis had been raised, and the rich, free-wheeling court life of the Aquitaine with which Eleanor was familiar. Louis and Eleanor had two daughters, Marie and Alix.

In the first part of his reign, Louis was vigorous and zealous in the exercise of his prerogatives. His accession was marked by no disturbances other than uprisings by the burgesses of Orléans and Poitiers, who wished to organise communes. He soon came into violent conflict with Pope Innocent II, however, when the archbishopric of Bourges became vacant. The king supported the chancellor Cadurc as a candidate to fill the vacancy against the pope's nominee Pierre de la Chatre, swearing upon relics that so long as he lived, Pierre should never enter Bourges. The pope thus imposed an interdict upon the king.

Louis then became involved in a war with Theobald II of Champagne by permitting Raoul I of Vermandois, the seneschal of France, to repudiate his wife, Theobald II's sister, and to marry Petronilla of Aquitaine, sister of the queen of France. As a result, Champagne decided to side with the pope in the dispute over Bourges. The war lasted two years (1142–1144) and ended with the occupation of Champagne by the royal army. Louis was personally involved in the assault and burning of the town of Vitry-en-Perthois. At least 1,500 people who had sought refuge in the church died in the flames. Condemned by the ecclesiastical authorities, Louis removed his armies from Champagne and returned them to Theobald. He accepted Pierre de la Chatre as archbishop of Bourges and shunned Raoul and Petronilla. Desiring to atone for his sins, he declared his intention of mounting a crusade on Christmas Day 1145 at Bourges. Bernard of Clairvaux assured its popularity by his preaching at Vezelay on Easter 1146.

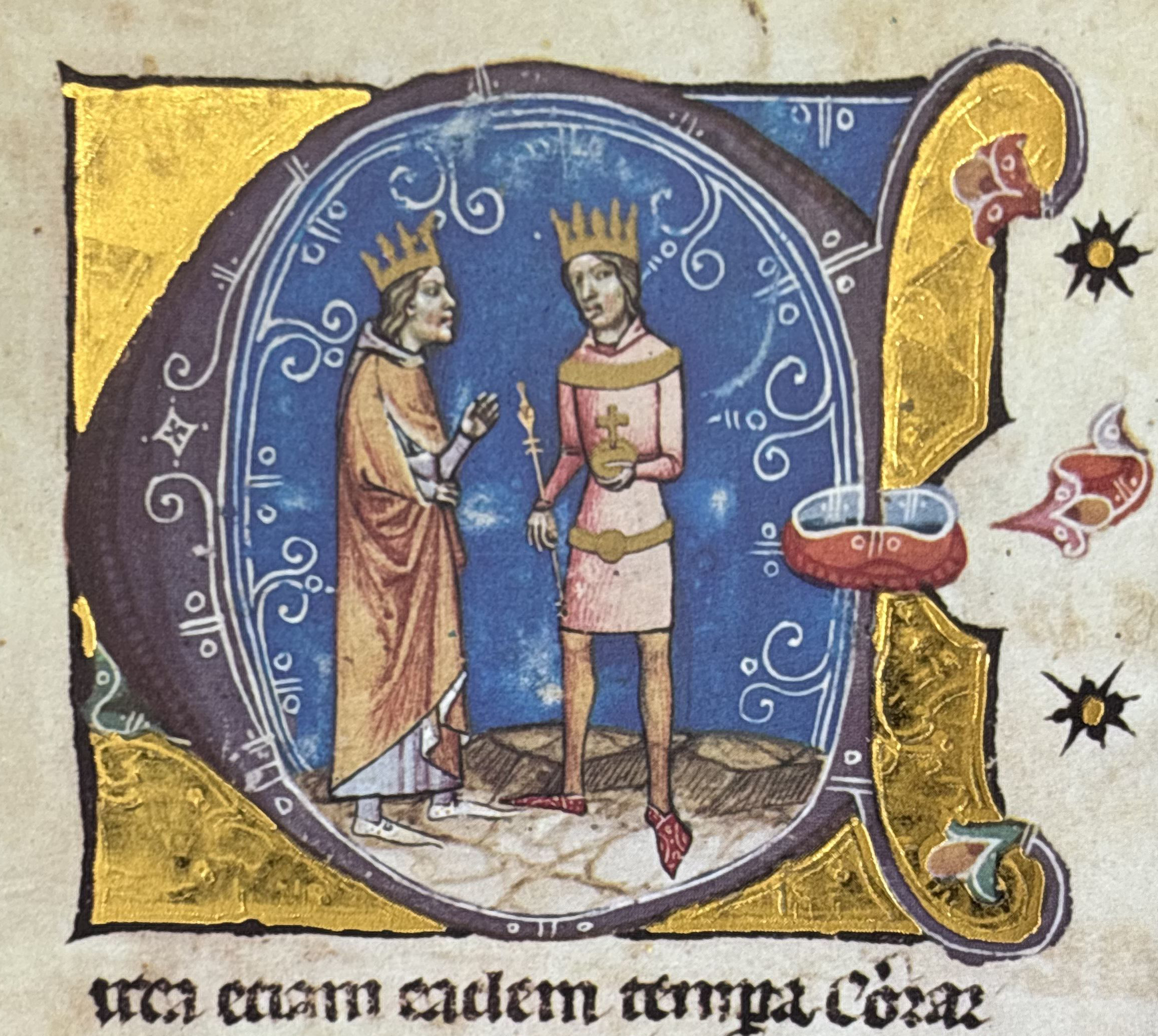
Géza II of Hungary and Louis VII of France. Image from the Hungarian Chronicon Pictum (1358)

In the meantime, Geoffrey V, Count of Anjou, completed his conquest of Normandy in 1144. In exchange for being recognised as Duke of Normandy by Louis, Geoffrey surrendered half of the county of Vexin—a region vital to Norman security—to Louis. Considered a clever move by Louis at the time, it would later prove yet another step towards Angevin rule.

In June 1147, in fulfillment of his vow to mount the Second Crusade, Louis and his queen set out from the Basilica of Saint-Denis, first stopping in Metz on the overland route to Syria. Soon they arrived in the Kingdom of Hungary, where they were welcomed by the king Géza II of Hungary, who was already waiting with King Conrad III of Germany. Due to his good relationships with Louis, Géza II asked the French king to be his son Stephen's godfather. Relations between the kingdoms of France and Hungary remained cordial long after this time: decades later, Louis's daughter Margaret was taken as wife by Géza's son Béla III of Hungary.

After receiving provisions from Géza, the army continued its march to Constantinople. After meeting with Manuel and receiving some supplies, the French crusaders moved to join up with Conrad's army. Louis conferred with Conrad and decided to wait for the Germans to reorganize before joining him at Lopadium. Louis set out on what he assumed would be simpler paths into Philadelphia. Concerned about the winter shortage of supplies in hostile, Seljuk-held central Anatolia, Louis and Conrad made the decision to alter their journey by 11 November. After a month of travel Louis' army arrived at Ephesus. He chose, despite warning from Byzantine messengers, to march inland towards the Maender valley. Just beyond Laodicea, at Mount Cadmus, the French army was ambushed by Turks. In the resulting battle, the Turks first bombarded the French with arrows and heavy stones, then swarmed down from the mountains and massacred them. The historian Odo of Deuil gives this account:

During the fighting the King Louis lost his small and famous royal guard, but he remained in good heart and nimbly and courageously scaled the side of the mountain by gripping the tree roots [...] The enemy climbed after him, hoping to capture him, and the enemy in the distance continued to fire arrows at him. But God willed that his cuirass should protect him from the arrows, and to prevent himself from being captured he defended the crag with his bloody sword, cutting off many heads and hands.

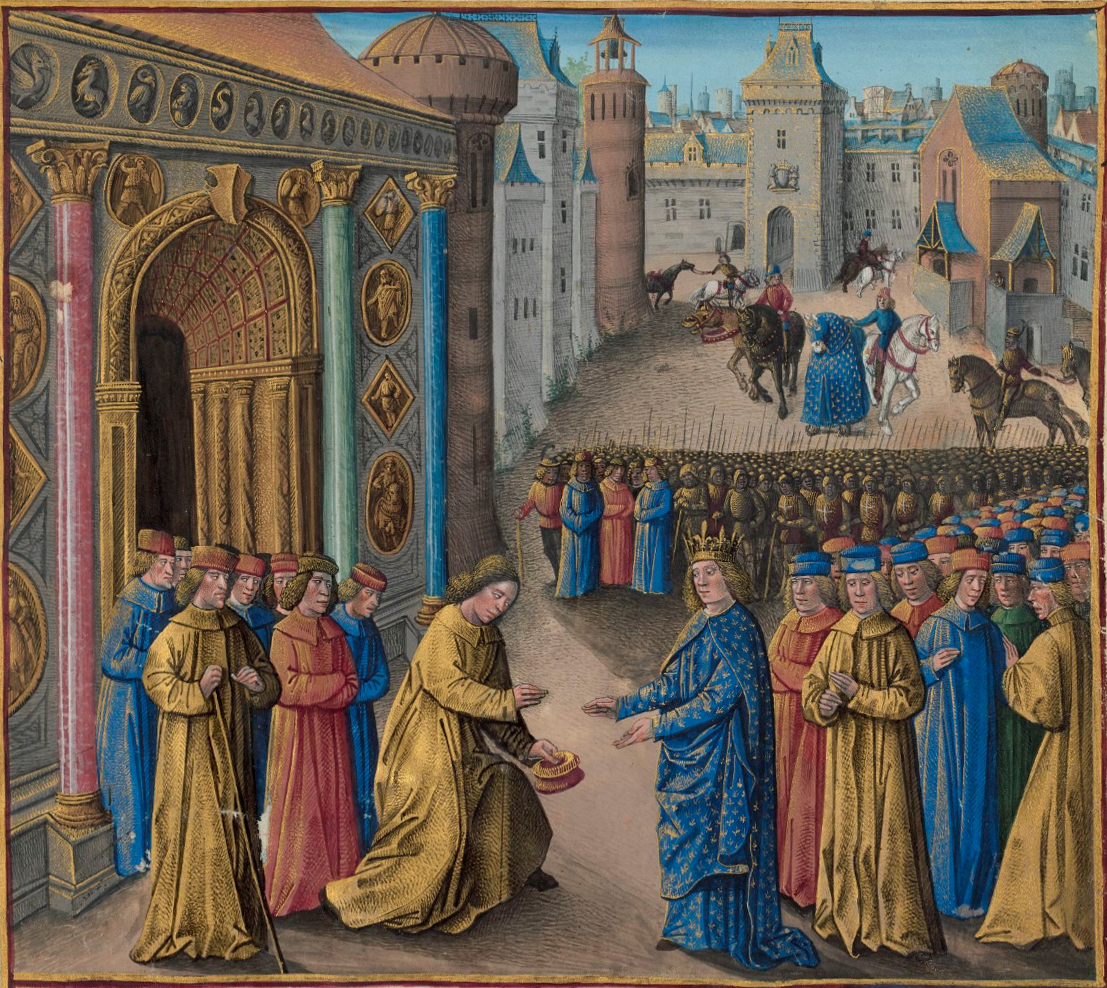
Raymond of Poitiers welcoming Louis VII in Antioch (15th-century illustration)

After this battle, Louis refused to travel by land any further and boarded ships at Adalia, but left his army walk across Isauria, which Odo of Deuil reports took more than a month. He finally reached Antioch in March 1148. His queen Eleanor supported her uncle, Raymond of Poitiers, and prevailed upon Louis to help Antioch against Aleppo. But Louis' interest lay in Jerusalem, and so he slipped out of Antioch in secret and went to Jerusalem. He united with King Conrad III of Germany and King Baldwin III of Jerusalem to lay siege to Damascus; this ended in disaster and the campaign was abandoned after just four days. Louis decided to leave the Holy Land, despite the protests of Eleanor, who still wanted to help her doomed uncle Raymond, after Easter of 1149. Departing from Acre, he returned to France via Italy, and after visiting Roger II of Sicily and Pope Eugene III, crossed the Alps and reached Paris in November.

== A shift in the status quo ==
The expedition to the Holy Land came at a great cost to the royal treasury and military. It also precipitated a conflict with Eleanor that led to the annulment of their marriage. Perhaps the marriage to Eleanor might have continued if the royal couple had produced a male heir, but this had not occurred. The Council of Beaugency found an exit clause, declaring that Louis and Eleanor were too closely related for their marriage to be legal, thus the marriage was annulled on 21 March 1152. The pretext of kinship was the basis for annulment, but in fact, it owed more to the state of hostility between Louis and Eleanor, with a decreasing likelihood that their marriage would produce a male heir to the throne of France. On 18 May 1152, Eleanor married the Count of Anjou, the future King Henry II of England. She gave him the duchy of Aquitaine and bore him three daughters and five sons. Louis led an ineffective war against Henry for having married without the authorisation of his suzerain. The result was a humiliation for the enemies of Henry and Eleanor, who saw their troops routed, their lands ravaged, and their property stolen. Louis reacted by coming down with a fever and returned to the Île-de-France.

In 1154, Louis married Constance of Castile, daughter of King Alfonso VII of Castile. She also failed to supply him with a son and heir, bearing only two daughters, Margaret and Alys. By 1157, Henry II of England began to believe that Louis might never produce a male heir, and that the succession of France would consequently be left in question. Determined to secure a claim for his family, he sent his chancellor, Thomas Becket, to press for a marriage between Margaret and Henry's heir, Henry the Young King. Louis agreed to this proposal, and by the Treaty of Gisors (1158) betrothed the young pair, giving as a dowry the Norman city of Gisors and the surrounding county of Vexin.

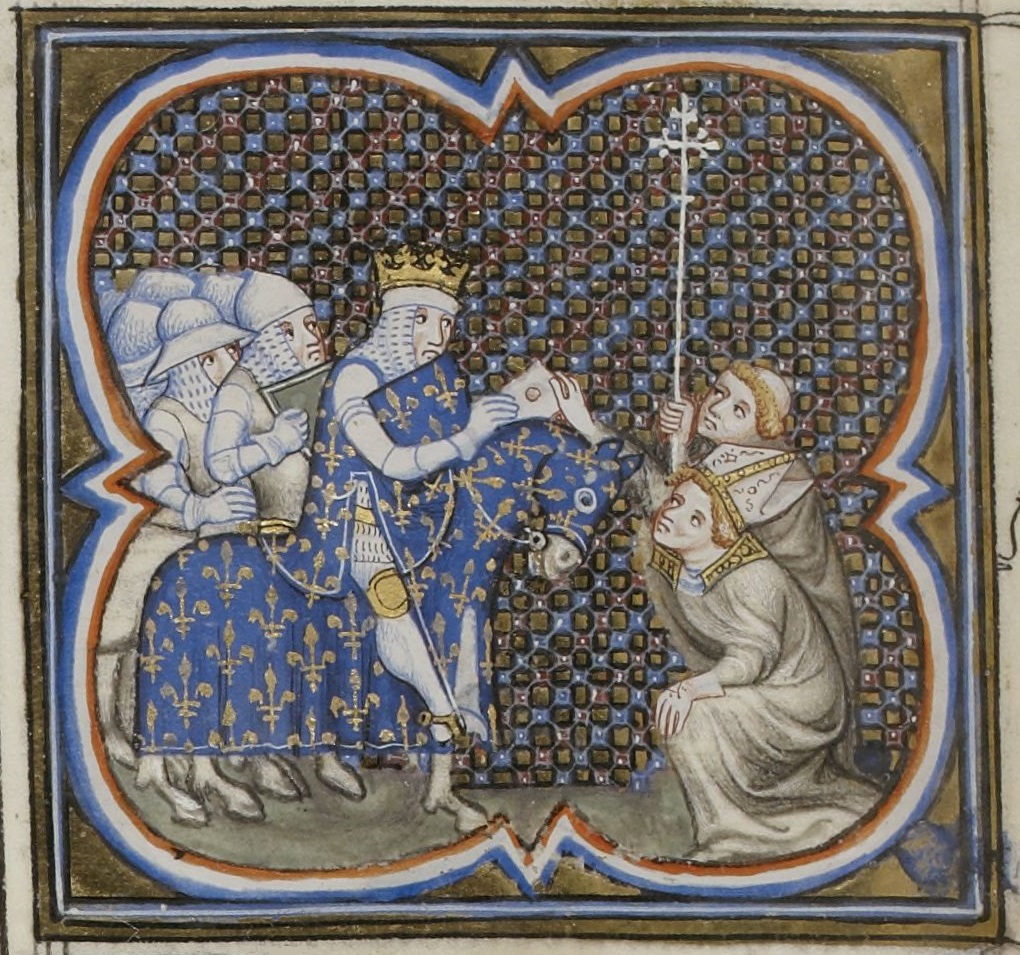
Louis VII receiving clergymen (from the Grandes Chroniques de France, c. 1375–1379)

Louis was devastated when Constance died in childbirth on 4 October 1160. As he was desperate for a son, he married Adela of Champagne just five weeks later. To counterbalance the advantage this would give the king of France, Henry II had the marriage of their children (Henry "the Young King" and Margaret) celebrated at once. Louis understood the danger of the growing Angevin power; however, through indecision and a lack of fiscal and military resources in comparison to Henry II, he failed to oppose Angevin hegemony effectively. One of his few successes was a trip to Toulouse in 1159 to aid Raymond V, Count of Toulouse, who had been attacked by Henry II: Louis entered into the city with a small escort, claiming to be visiting his sister, the countess. Henry declared that he could not attack the city while his liege lord was inside, and went home. In 1169, Louis was petitioned by the bishop of Le Puy to stop the Viscount of Polignac from attacking travellers through Auvergne. The viscount was besieged by Louis at Nonette and the county was turned into a prévôt.

== Diplomacy ==
Louis' reign saw Holy Roman Emperor Frederick I press his claims to Arles, in southeastern France. When a papal schism broke out in 1159, Louis took the side of Pope Alexander III, the enemy of Frederick I, and after two comical failures of Frederick I to meet Louis at Saint-Jean-de-Losne (on 29 August and 22 September 1162), Louis definitely gave himself up to the cause of Alexander III, who lived at Sens from 1163 to 1165. In return for his loyal support, the pope bestowed upon Louis the Golden Rose.

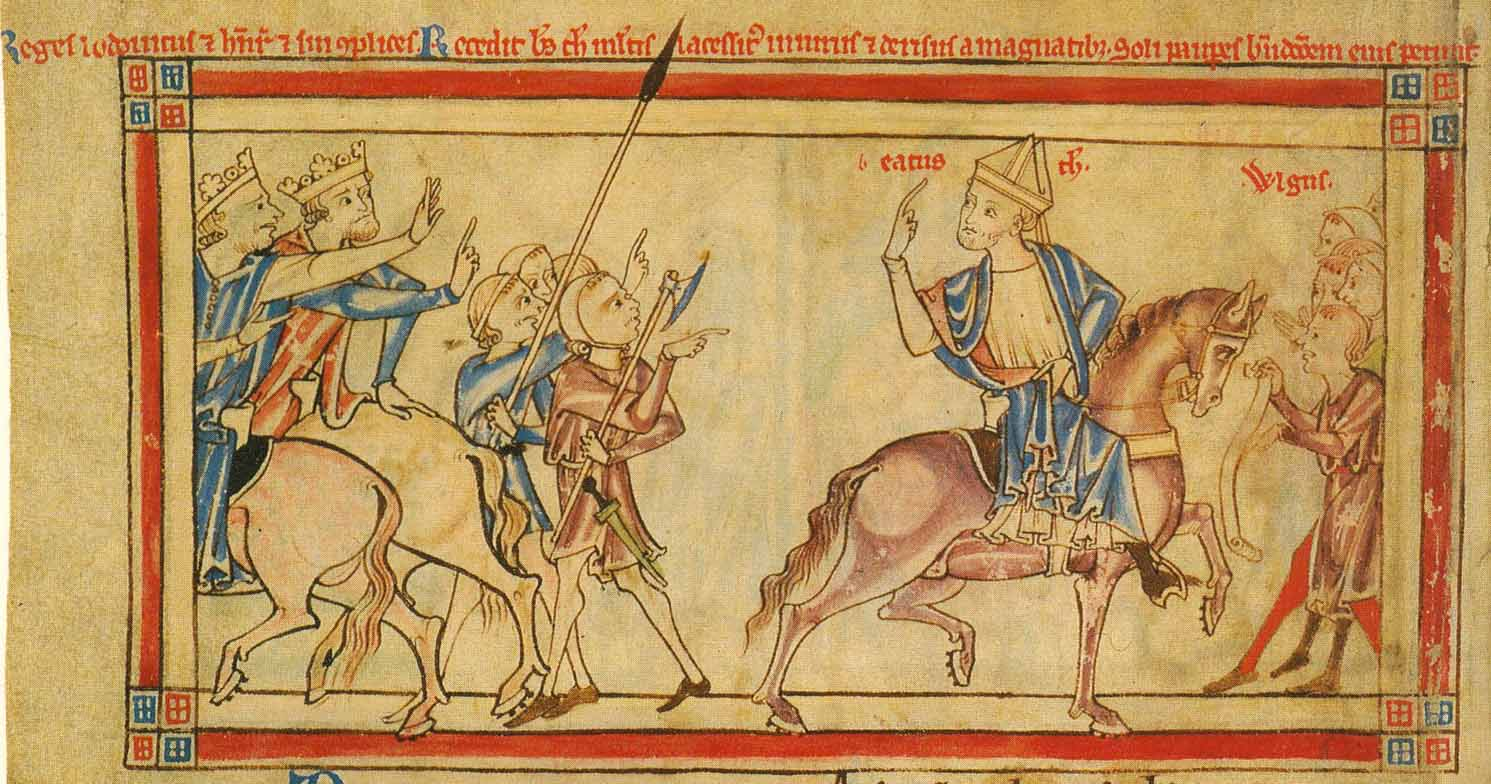
Thomas Becket leaves Louis VII and Henry II in January 1169, illustration from c. 1220–1240, possibly by Matthew Paris

Louis exploited the conflict between Henry II and Thomas Becket, the archbishop of Canterbury who had fled England in 1164. At first reluctant to support Becket, in 1166 Louis offered the archbishop refuge in the royal lands and a pension. He also supported the Welsh in their revolt against Henry, gave aid to Brittany which was under English attack, and made overtures to the Scottish king. However, Louis' short campaign in Normandy in 1167 was a failure, and by 1168 he was obliged to abandon his allies and made a separate truce with Henry. Peace talks were held at Montmirail in January 1169, where it was agreed that Louis' daughter Margaret would marry Henry's son Henry the Young, who was to be crowned king during his father's lifetime. But the deal was sabotaged by Becket, who refused to crown Henry the Young and Margaret. Louis subsequently resumed his hostile attitude towards Henry; Becket's murder in 1170 increased the distrust between the two monarchs.

Louis also tried to weaken Henry by supporting his rebellious sons, and encouraged Plantagenet disunity by making Henry's sons, rather than Henry himself, the feudal overlords of the Angevin territories in France. But the rivalry among Henry's sons and Louis's own indecisiveness broke up the coalition (1173–1174) between them. Finally, in 1177, the pope intervened to bring the two kings to terms at Vitry-en-Perthois.

In 1165, Louis's third wife bore him a son and heir, Philip. Louis had him crowned at Reims in 1179, in the Capetian tradition (Philip would in fact be the last king so crowned). Already stricken with paralysis, Louis himself could not be present at the ceremony. He died on 18 September 1180 in Paris and was buried the next day at Barbeau Abbey, which he had founded. His remains were moved to the Basilica of Saint-Denis in 1817.

== Marriages and children ==
Louis's children by his three marriages:

With Eleanor of Aquitaine:

- Marie (1145 – 11 March 1198), married Henry I of Champagne
- Alix (1151–1197/1198), married Theobald V of Blois

With Constance of Castile:

- Margaret (1158 – August/September 1197), married (1) Henry the Young King; (2) King Béla III of Hungary
- Alys (4 October 1160 – c. 1220), engaged to Richard I of England; she married William IV, Count of Ponthieu

With Adela of Champagne:

- Philip II Augustus (22 August 1165 – 1223)
- Agnes (1171 – after 1204), married 1) Alexius II Comnenus (1180–1183), 2) Andronicus I Comnenus (1183–1185), then 3) Theodore Branas (1204)

== Fictional portrayals ==
Louis is a character in Jean Anouilh's 1959 play Becket. In the 1964 film adaptation, he was portrayed by John Gielgud, who was nominated for the Academy Award for Best Supporting Actor. He was also portrayed by Charles Kay in the 1978 BBC TV drama series The Devil's Crown. He has a role in Sharon Kay Penman's novels When Christ and His Saints Slept and Devil's Brood. The early part of Norah Lofts' biography of Eleanor of Aquitaine deals considerably with Louis, seen through Eleanor's eyes and giving her side in their problematic relationship. Louis is one of the main characters in Elizabeth Chadwick's novel The Summer Queen.

== Sources ==
- Baldwin, John W. (2005). "Chrétien in History". In Lacy, Norris J.; Grimbert, Joan Tasker (eds.). A Companion to Chrétien de Troyes. DS Brewer.
- Baldwin, Marshall W.; Setton, Kenneth M., eds. (1969). A History of the Crusades. Vol. I: The First Hundred Years. University of Wisconsin Press.
  - Berry, Virginia G. "The Second Crusade". In Baldwin & Setton (1969), pp. 463–512.
- Bardot, Michael L.; Marvin, Laurence W., eds. (2018). Louis VII and his World. Brill.
- Bisson, Thomas N. (2009). The Crisis of the Twelfth Century: Power, Lordship, and the Origins of European Government. Princeton University Press.
- Bradbury, Jim (2007). The Capetians: Kings of France 987–1328. Hambledon Continuum.
- Brown, Elizabeth A. R. (1992). "Franks, Burgundians, and Aquitanians" and the Royal Coronation Ceremony in France. The American Philosophical Society. ISBN 978-0-871-69827-8. OL 1748828M.
- Dunbabin, Jean (1985). France in the Making, 943–1180. Oxford University Press.
- Dunbabin, Jean (2007). "Henry II and Louis VII". In Harper-Bill, Christopher; Vincent, Nicholas (eds.). Henry II: New Interpretations. The Boydell Press.
- Foulet, Lucien (1922). "Chapter VIII: Literature". In Tilley, Arthur Augustus (ed.). Medieval France: A Companion to French Studies. Cambridge University Press. pp. 275–329.
- Gislebertus of Mons (2005). Chronicle of Hainaut. Translated by Napran, Laura. The Boydell Press.
- Hodgson, Natasha (2007). Women, Crusading and the Holy Land in Historical Narrative. Boydell. ISBN 978-1-84383-332-1.
- Jones, Dan (2012). The Plantagenets: The Warrior Kings and Queens Who Made England. Viking Press. ISBN 978-0-670-02665-4. OL 27144084M.
- Kaeuper, Richard W. (2016). Medieval Chivalry. Cambridge University Press.
- Kelly, Amy Ruth (1991). Eleanor of Aquitaine and the Four Kings. Harvard University Press.
- Kinoshita, Sharon (2006). Medieval Boundaries: Rethinking Difference in Old French Literature. University of Pennsylvania Press.
- Laszlovszky, Jozsef (2016). "Local Tradition or European Patterns? The grave of Gertrude in the Pilis Cistercian Abbey". In Jaritz, Gerhard; Szende, Katalin (eds.). Medieval East Central Europe in a Comparative Perspective. Routledge.
- Marvin, Laurence W. (2019). "King Louis Vii of France Fails to Lead: Disaster on the Second Crusade". Medieval Warfare. 9 (2): 38–43. ISSN 2211-5129. JSTOR 48637203.
- McMahon, Lucas (2026). "Avoiding Konya: How to go to the Holy Land in the Twelfth Century". Journal of Medieval History. 52 (1): 1–36. doi:10.1080/03044181.2025.2568481.
- Petit-Dutaillis, Charles (1999). The Feudal Monarchy in France and England. Translated by Hunt, E. David. Routledge.
- Potts, Cassandra (2002). "Normandy 911-1144". In Harper-Bill, Christopher; Van Houts, Elisabeth M. C. (eds.). A Companion to the Anglo-Norman World. The Boydell Press. pp. 19–43. ISBN 978-184383-341-3.41
- Robinson, Ian Stuart (1996). The Papacy, 1073–1198: Continuity and Innovation. Cambridge University Press.
- Spiegel, Gabrielle M. (1997). The Past as Text: The Theory and Practice of Medieval Historiography. Johns Hopkins University Press.
- Strickland, Matthew (2016). Henry the Young King, 1155-1183. Yale University Press. ISBN 9780300215519.
- Turner, Ralph V. (2009). Eleanor of Aquitaine: Queen of France, Queen of England. Yale University Press.
- Tyerman, Christopher (2007). God's War: A New History of the Crusades. Penguin.
- Warren, Wilfred Lewis (1977). Henry II. University of California Press.
- Warren, Wilfred Lewis (1978). King John. University of California Press.
- Wolfe, Michael (2009). Walled Towns and the Shaping of France: From the Medieval to the Early Modern Era. Palgrave Macmillan.

Louis VII of France House of Capet Born: 1120 Died: 18 September 1180
Regnal titles
| Preceded by Louis VI | King of France; 1131–1180 with Louis VI (1131–1137); Philip II (1179–1180) | Succeeded by Philip II |
French nobility
| Preceded by Eleanor as sole ruler | Duke of Aquitaine; 1137–1152 with Eleanor | Succeeded by Eleanor as sole ruler |
