= Albofledis =

Frankish Noblewoman

Albofledis (or Albochledis) was a Frankish noblewoman, the daughter of the Frankish king Childeric I (d. 481) and the Thuringian noblewoman Basina (d. 477). She was a sister of Clovis I. According to Gregory of Tours, she was baptised on the same day as her brother. This event has been dated as early as 496 or as late as 509. At the time she dedicated herself to a life of perpetual virginity, but she died not long after. Bishop Remigius of Reims addressed a letter of consolation to Clovis on the occasion of her death. This letter is quoted in part by Gregory, and is also included in full in the collection known as the Epistolae Austrasicae. Although Gregory spells her name Albofledis, the scribe of the Epistolae gives Albochledis. Remigius describes her as "chosen by God", a deo electa.

Some historians are of the opinion that Albofledis is the same person as Audofleda and that Clovis had only two sisters, the other being Lantechildis.

== Sources ==
- Hartmann, Martina (2008). "Gregor von Tours und arianische Königinnen oder Hatte Chlodwig I. zwei oder drei Schwestern?". Mitteilungen des Instituts für Österreichische Geschichtsforschung. 116 (1–4): 130–137. doi:10.7767/miog.2008.116.14.130. S2CID 163615978.
- Martindale, John R., ed. (1980). The Prosopography of the Later Roman Empire: Volume II, AD 395–527. Cambridge: Cambridge University Press. ISBN 0-521-20159-4.
- Murray, Alexander Callander, ed. (2008). From Roman to Merovingian Gaul: A Reader. University of Toronto Press.
- Shanzer, Danuta (1998). "Dating the Baptism of Clovis: The Bishop of Vienne vs the Bishop of Tours". Early Medieval Europe. 7 (1): 29–57. doi:10.1111/1468-0254.00017.
