= Henry the Young King =

Junior King of England from 1170 to 1183

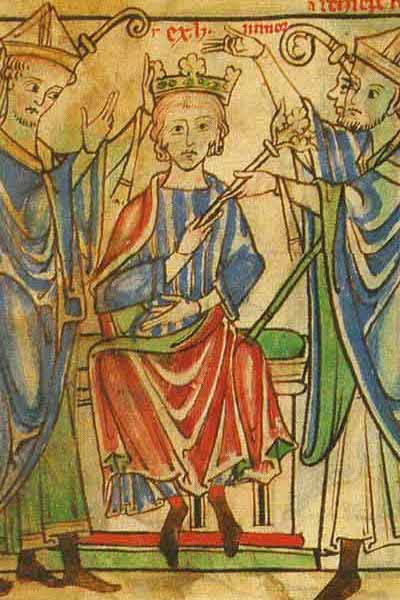
- Illumination of Henry's coronation in the Becket Leaves, c. 1220–1240

Junior King of England
- Reign: 14 June 1170 – 11 June 1183
- Coronation: 14 June 1170
- Senior king: Henry II
- Born: 28 February 1155; London, England
- Died: 11 June 1183 (aged 28); Castle of Martel, Lot, France
- Burial: Rouen Cathedral, Normandy, France
- Spouse: Margaret of France (m. 1172)
- Issue: William
- House: Plantagenet-Angevin (Note: Historians are divided in their use of the terms Plantagenet and Angevin in regard to Henry II and his children. Some class Henry II to be the first Plantagenet king of England; others refer to Henry II, Richard I, and John as the Angevin dynasty, and consider Henry III to be the first Plantagenet ruler.)
- Father: Henry II of England
- Mother: Eleanor of Aquitaine

Henry the Young King (28 February 1155 – 11 June 1183) was the eldest son of Henry II of England and Eleanor of Aquitaine to survive childhood. In 1170, he became titular King of England, Duke of Normandy, Count of Anjou and of Maine. Henry the Young King was the only English king since the Norman Conquest to be crowned during his father's reign, but he was frustrated by his father's refusal to grant him meaningful autonomous power. He died aged 28, six years before his father, during the course of a campaign in Limousin against his father and his brother Richard.

== Early life ==
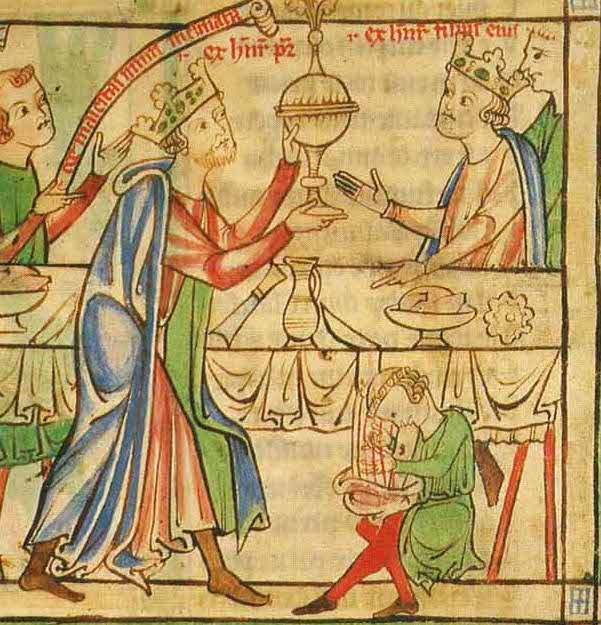
At his coronation banquet, the Young King (top right) is served by his father, King Henry II (Becket Leaves, c. 1220–1240).

Henry was born 28 February 1155 to Henry II of England and Eleanor of Aquitaine. His mother's children by her first marriage to Louis VII of France were Marie and Alix. He had one elder brother, William, who died at age three. His younger siblings included Matilda, Richard, Geoffrey, Eleanor, Joan and John.

In June 1170, the 15-year-old Henry was crowned king during his father's lifetime, a traditional practice of the French Capetian dynasty which held formal overlordship of Henry II's continental domains. King Stephen had previously attempted to have his son Eustace crowned as early as 1143 but was unable to secure papal support prior to Eustace's death.

He was known in his own lifetime as "Henry the Young King" to distinguish him from his father. As he was not a reigning king, he is not counted in the numerical succession of kings of England. According to one of Thomas Becket's correspondents, Henry was knighted by his father before the coronation, but William Marshal, Earl of Pembroke, asserts in History of William Marshal that Henry was knighted by Marshall during the Revolt of 1173–1174.

== Tournament hero and celebrity ==
Henry did not appear to have been very interested in the day-to-day business of government, which distinguished him from his father and younger brothers. His father, however, is reputed to have failed to delegate authority to his son, retaining power in England. The majority opinion amongst historians is that of W. L. Warren: "The Young Henry was the only member of the family who was popular in his own day ... also the only one who gave no evidence of political sagacity, military skill, or even ordinary intelligence..." Warren elaborates "He was gracious, benign, affable, courteous, the soul of liberality and generosity. Unfortunately, he was also shallow, vain, careless, empty-headed, incompetent, improvident, and irresponsible."

The Young King's contemporary reputation, however, was positive. Likely this was due to the enthusiastic tournament culture of his time. In the History of William Marshal (the biography of the knight assigned to him as a tutor in 1170 and his tournament team leader until 1182) he is described as a constant competitor at tournaments across northern and central France between 1175 and 1182. With his cousins Counts Philip I of Flanders and Baldwin V of Hainaut, he was a key patron of the sport. He brought 200 knights to the tournament of Lagny-sur-Marne in November 1179, paying each 20 shillings per day.

Though he lacked political weight, his patronage brought him celebrity status throughout western Europe. The baron and troubadour Bertran de Born knew him, stating:

[He was] the best king who ever took up a shield, the most daring and best of all tourneyers. From the time when Roland was alive, and even before, never was seen a knight so skilled, so warlike, whose fame resounded so around the world – even if Roland did come back, or if the world were searched as far as the River Nile and the setting sun.

There was a perception amongst his contemporaries, and the next generation, that his death in 1183 marked a decline both in the tournament and knightly endeavour. His chaplain Gervase of Tilbury remarked on his passing: "Assuredly, as he was a solace to the world while he lived, so it was a blow to all chivalry when he died in the very glow of youth."

The traditional view of Young Henry propagated into the modern era by Warren has, however, been challenged in recent years. Matthew Strickland has argued in his compendium of the Young King's life and career that he was, in fact, an able and likeable individual who merely grew frustrated at his father's refusal to grant him any domains or responsibilities of his own.

== Political career ==
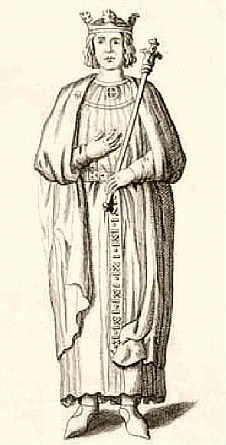
Drawing of the recumbent statue in Rouen Cathedral destroyed in 1733; from Livre du Millénaire de la Normandie (1911, after a drawing of c. 1700)

Henry played an important part in the politics of his father's reign. On 2 November 1160 he was betrothed to Margaret of France, daughter of Louis VII of France and his second wife, Constance of Castile, when he was five years of age and she was at least two. The marriage was an attempt to finally settle the struggle between the counts of Anjou and the French kings over possession of the frontier district of the Norman Vexin, which Louis VII had acquired from Henry's grandfather, Geoffrey Plantagenet, Count of Anjou, in around 1144. By the terms of the settlement, Margaret would bring the castles of Vexin to her husband when she wed. However, the marriage was pushed through by Henry II when Young Henry and Margaret were small children so that he could seize the castles. A bitter border war followed between the kings.

Henry II had toyed with the idea of having Young Henry crowned king as early as 1162 and even procured a papal bull from Pope Alexander III ordering the Archbishop Roger of York to crown Young Henry whenever required. Thomas Becket, newly ordained as Archbishop of Canterbury, had been ordered to prepare for the coronation of Young Henry, and the pipe rolls for 1162 record the allocation of funds for the commissioning of a golden circlet. This was not to be, however; Barlow suggests that the southern prelates dissuaded Henry II from using the papal bull as the Archbishopric of Canterbury was occupied. This greatly upset Roger of York, who wrote to Rome asking for confirmation of his right to crown kings; while ultimately unsuccessful, Roger's delays derailed Henry's plans.

Young Henry was finally crowned on Saturday 14 June 1170 on the feast of St Basil at Westminster Abbey, in the presence of most of the Anglo-Norman nobility and the overwhelming majority of the non-vacant English bishoprics. Strickland notes that the exiled Becket had few supporters left in the upper ranks of the English church after six years of dispute with Henry II.

It was almost certainly a calculated insult to Louis VII that Margaret of France was not crowned alongside her husband in 1170. Twelfth-century chronicler Robert of Torigny argues she simply arrived from Normandy too late to participate, but other sources reveal she was deliberately delayed at Caen. Warren believes that this was an ultimately fruitful attempt to prevent Louis VII from dissuading Becket from accepting his latest overtures. Whatever the case, Louis was so enraged by this that he launched an immediate attack on the Norman border, forcing Henry to return to the duchy personally to oversee its defences. Mediation by Count Theobald of Blois, however, led to a meeting between the two monarchs at Vendôme, and following subsequent meetings at La Ferté and Fréteval, Henry was able to placate Louis.

Young Henry and Margaret were formally married on 27 August 1172 at Winchester Cathedral, when Henry, aged 17, was crowned King of England a second time, this time together with Margaret, by Rotrou, the Archbishop of Rouen.

Young Henry fell out with his father in 1173. Contemporary chroniclers allege that this was owing to the young man's frustration that his father had given him no realm to rule, and his feeling starved of funds. The rebellion seems, however, to have drawn strength from much deeper discontent with his father's rule, and a formidable party of Anglo-Norman, Norman, Angevin, Poitevin and Breton magnates joined him. The revolt of 1173–1174 came close to toppling the king; he was narrowly saved by the loyalty of a party of nobles with holdings on the English side of the Channel and by the defeat and capture of William I, the King of Scotland. Young Henry sought a reconciliation after the capture of his mother Eleanor and the failure of the rebellion. His funds were much increased by the terms of the settlement, and he apparently devoted most of the next seven years to the amusement of the tournament.

In November 1179, he represented his father at the coronation of Philip Augustus as associate king of France at Reims. He acted as steward of France and carried the crown in the coronation procession. Later, he played a leading role in the celebratory tournament held at Lagny-sur-Marne, to which he brought a retinue of over 500 knights at huge expense.

Young Henry's affairs took a turn for the worse in 1182. He fell out with William Marshal, the leader of his tournament mesnée. The unknown author of L'Histoire de Guillaume le Maréchal suggests that Marshal's disgrace was because he had been falsely accused of a clandestine affair with Queen Margaret. David Crouch, one of the Marshal's principal modern biographers, argues that the charge against William was actually one of lèse-majesté, brought on by Marshal's own arrogance and greed. By this account, the charge of adultery was only introduced in the History of William Marshal as a distraction from the real charges, while Thomas Asbridge states that the accusations very strongly appear to have been fabricated by William's jealous political enemies. William had left Young Henry's service by early 1183 but was recalled to his side by May of that year, having been cleared of all charges. Though the Young King sent his wife early in 1183 to the French court, it was done most likely to keep her safe in the impending war with his brother Richard rather than because she was in disgrace.

Margaret gave birth to a baby boy named William, who may have been born prematurely on 19 June 1177, and died only three days later.

== Death and burial ==
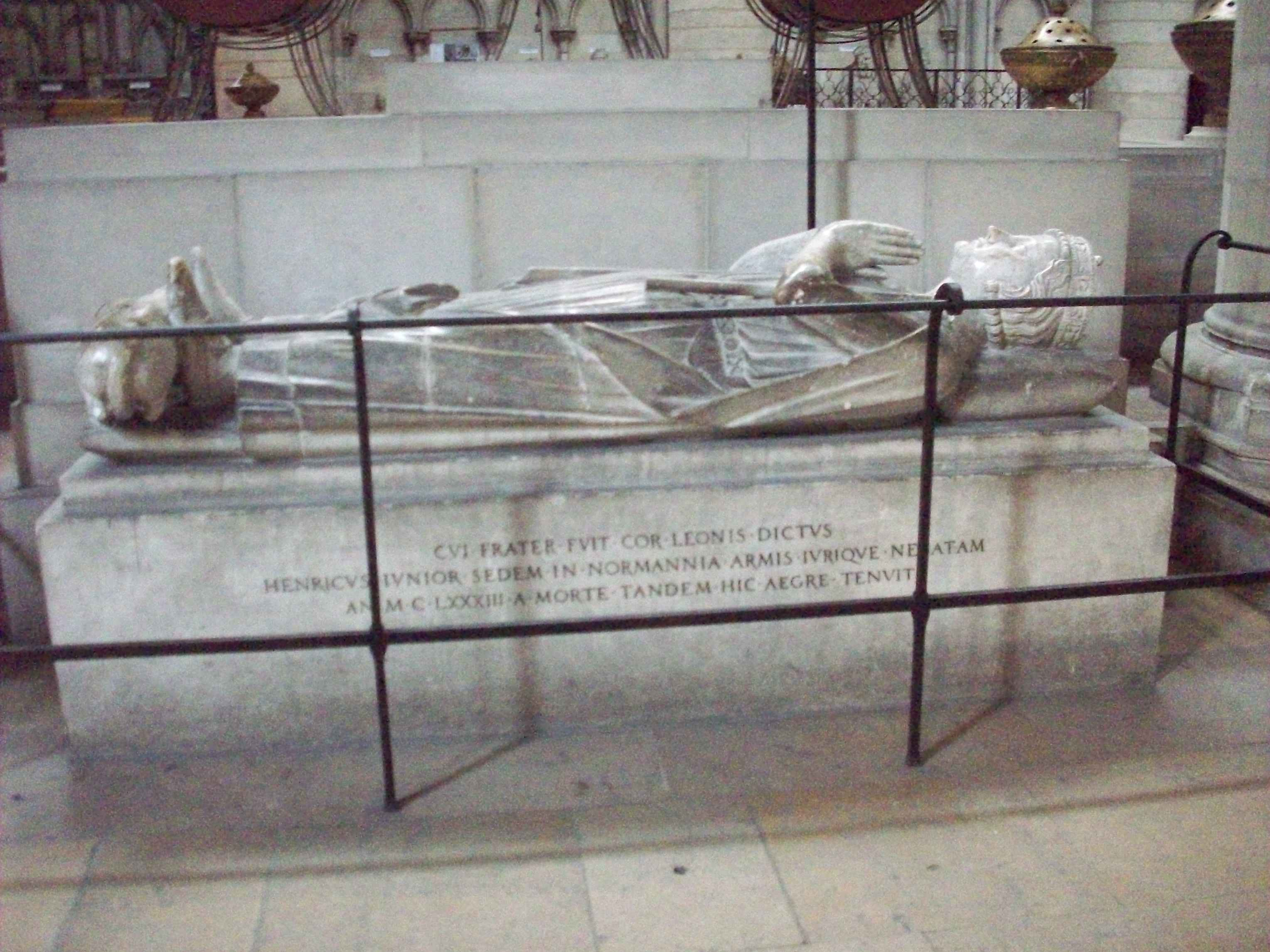
Tomb and effigy of Henry in Rouen Cathedral

Henry the Young King died, aged 28, in the summer of 1183, during the course of a campaign in Limousin against his father and his brother Richard. He had just finished pillaging local monasteries to raise money to pay his mercenaries. He contracted dysentery at the beginning of June. Weakening fast, he was taken to Martel in Quercy. It was clear to his household that he was dying on 7 June, when he was confessed and received the last rites.

As a token of his penitence for his war against his father, he prostrated himself naked on the floor before a crucifix. He made a testament, and since he had taken a crusader's vow, he gave his cloak to Marshal with the plea that he should take the cloak (presumably with the crusader's cross stitched to it) to the Holy Sepulchre in Jerusalem. On his deathbed, he reportedly asked to be reconciled to his father, but King Henry, fearing a trick, refused to see him. He died on 11 June, clasping a ring his father had sent instead as a sign of his forgiveness. After his death, his father is said to have exclaimed: "He cost me much, but I wish he had lived to cost me more."

After Henry's death, there was an attempt by his mother and a faction of his friends to promote his sainthood. Thomas of Earley, Archdeacon of Wells, published a sermon not long afterward detailing miraculous events attending the cortège that took his body north to Normandy. Henry had left orders that his entrails and other body parts should be buried in Limousin, but the rest of his body should rest in Rouen Cathedral. However, during the funeral procession, a member of Henry's household was seized by his mercenary captains for debts the late king had owed them. The knights accompanying his corpse were so penniless they had to be fed by charity at the monastery of Vigeois. There were large and emotional gatherings wherever his body rested. At Le Mans, the local bishop halted the procession and ordered the body buried in his cathedral, perhaps to help defuse the civil unrest Henry's death had caused. The dean of Rouen recovered the body from the chapter of Le Mans a month later by a lawsuit so that the Young Henry could be buried in Normandy as he had desired in his testament. Henry's remains are in Rouen Cathedral, where his tomb is on the opposite side of the altar from the tomb of the heart of his younger brother, Richard I of England, with whom he was perpetually quarrelling. The tomb of the Archbishop of Rouen, who had married him to Margaret, lies nearby in the ambulatory. His brothers Richard and John each later became kings of England.

== Appearance and character ==
The physical appearance of Henry at his coronation in 1170 is given in a contemporary court poem written in Latin. It describes the 15-year-old prince as being very handsome, "tall but well proportioned, broad-shouldered with a long and elegant neck, pale and freckled skin, bright and wide blue eyes, and a thick mop of reddish-gold hair".

Henry and Richard were "both tall in stature, rather above the middle size, and of commanding aspect. In courage and magnanimity, they were nearly equal; but in the character of their virtues, there was great disparity... [Henry] was admirable for gentleness and liberality... had a commendable suavity... commended for his easy temper... remarkable for his clemency... the vile and undeserving found their refuge in [Henry]... was the shield of bad men... was bent on martial sports... bestowed his favours on foreigners... [Henry's] ambition magnanimously compassed the world."

Another description says "He was tall in stature and distinguished in appearance; his face expressed merriment and mature judgment in good measure; fair among the children of men, he was courteous and cheerful. Gracious to all, he was loved by all; amiable to all, he was incapable of making an enemy. He was matchless in warfare, and as he outstripped them all in valour, cordiality, and the outstanding graciousness of his manners, his true generosity, and true integrity..."

== Genealogical table ==
Norman English and early Plantagenet monarchs and their relationship with rulers of Western Europe
: Red borders indicate English monarchs
: Bold borders indicate legitimate children of English monarchs

Baldwin II; King of Jerusalem	Fulk IV; Count of Anjou	Bertrade	Philip I King of France	William the Conqueror; King of England r. 1066–1087	Margaret	Malcolm III; King of Scotland
Melisende; Queen of Jerusalem	Fulk V King of Jerusalem	Eremburga; Countess of Maine	Robert Curthose	William II; King of England r. 1087–1100	Adela	Henry I King of England r. 1100–1135	Edith/Matilda	Duncan II; King of Scotland	Edgar; King of Scotland	Alexander I King of Scotland	David I King of Scotland
Sibylla	William Clito	Stephen; King of England r. 1135–1154	Geoffrey Plantagenet; Count of Anjou	Empress Matilda	Henry V Holy Roman Emperor	William Adelin; Duke of Normandy	Matilda	Sybilla	Henry
Margaret	Philip of Alsace; Count of Flanders	Louis VII; King of France	Eleanor	Henry II; King of England r. 1154–1189	Geoffrey; Count of Nantes	William FitzEmpress; Viscount of Dieppe	Malcolm IV; King of Scotland	William the Lion; King of Scotland
Baldwin I Latin Emperor, Count of Flanders, and Count of Hainaut	Isabella	Philip II; King of France	Henry	Matilda	Richard I King of England r. 1189–1199	Geoffrey II; Duke of Brittany	Eleanor	Alfonso VIII; King of Castile	Joan	William II; King of Sicily	John; King of England r. 1199–1216
Louis VIII; King of France	Otto IV; Holy Roman Emperor	Arthur I Duke of Brittany	Blanche	Henry III; King of England r. 1216–1272	Richard of Cornwall; King of the Romans	Joan	Alexander II; King of Scotland

== Bibliography ==
- W. L. Warren, Henry II (London, 1973) ISBN 0-520-03494-5
- O. H. Moore, The Young King Henry Plantagenet, 1155–83, in History, Literature, and Tradition (Columbus OH, 1925)
- G. Duby, William Marshal: the Flower of Chivalry trans. R. Howard (London, 1986)
- D. Crouch, William Marshal: Knighthood, War and Chivalry, 1147–1219 (2nd ed., London, 2002)
- D. Crouch, Tournament (London, 2005)
- L. Diggelmann, 'Marriage as Tactical Response: Henry II and the Royal Wedding of 1160', English Historical Review, CXIX, (2004), pp. 954–964
- Hamilton, J.S. (2010). The Plantagenets: History of a Dynasty. London: Continuum. ISBN 978-1-4411-5712-6. OL 28013041M.
- Seel, Graham E. (2012) King John: An Underrated King. London: Anthem Press. ISBN 978-0-8572-8518-8.
- R. J. Smith, 'Henry II's Heir: the Acta and Seal of Henry the Young King, 1170–83', English Historical Review, CXVI, (2001), pp. 297–326
- Gervase of Tilbury, Otia imperialia, ed and trans S.E. Banks and J.W. Binns (Oxford: Oxford University Press, 2002)

Henry the Young King House of Plantagenet Born: 28 February 1155 Died: 11 June 1183
Regnal titles
Preceded by Henry II as sole ruler	King of England; Duke of Normandy; Count of Anjou and Maine; 1170–1183 with Henry II	Succeeded by Henry II as sole ruler
