= Lantechildis =

Frankish noblewoman

Lantechildis (or Lenteildis) was a Frankish noblewoman, the daughter of the Frankish king Childeric I (d. 481) and the Thuringian noblewoman Basina (d. 477). She was a sister of Clovis I. She is mentioned in Gregory of Tours and the Liber historiae Francorum.

Lantechildis converted to Arianism and received Arian baptism. She may have been influenced to convert after her sister Audofleda converted at her marriage to the Ostrogothic king Theoderic the Great. Later she converted again and received a Catholic baptism like her brother and sister, Albofledis. Clovis' baptism took place between 496/498 and 508/509. Her conversion from heresy was the subject of a sermon by Bishop Avitus of Vienne entitled in Latin Homilia de conversione Lenteildis Chlodovaei sororis, "Homily on the conversion of Clovis' sister Lenteildis". Avitus preached the sermon at her baptism.

== Sources ==
- Cusack, Carole M. (1998). Conversion Among the Germanic Peoples. Cassell.
- Hartmann, Martina (2008). "Gregor von Tours und arianische Königinnen oder Hatte Chlodwig I. zwei oder drei Schwestern?". Mitteilungen des Instituts für Österreichische Geschichtsforschung. 116 (1–4): 130–137. doi:10.7767/miog.2008.116.14.130. S2CID 163615978.
- Martindale, John R., ed. (1980). The Prosopography of the Later Roman Empire: Volume II, AD 395–527. Cambridge: Cambridge University Press. ISBN 0-521-20159-4.
- Shanzer, Danuta (1998). "Dating the Baptism of Clovis: The Bishop of Vienne vs the Bishop of Tours". Early Medieval Europe. 7 (1): 29–57. doi:10.1111/1468-0254.00017. S2CID 161819012.
- Shanzer, Danuta; Wood, Ian N., eds. (2002). Avitus of Vienne: Letters and Selected Prose. Liverpool University Press.
- Vitiello, Massimiliano (2018). Amalasuintha: The Transformation of Queenship in the Post-Roman World. University of Pennsylvania Press.
- Wood, Ian N. (1994). The Merovingian Kingdoms, 450–751. Harlow: Longman.
