= Barbeau Abbey =

Abbey in Seine-et-Marne, France

Coordinates: 48°27′43″N 02°46′28″E

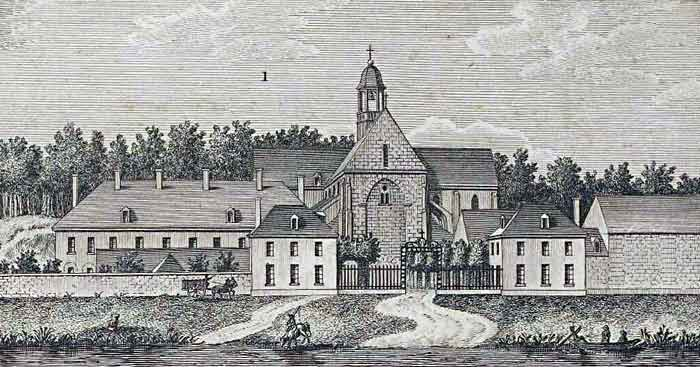
The abbey buildings in 1837, immediately prior to their demolition

Barbeau Abbey (French: Abbaye de Barbeau or Abbaye Notre-Dame de Barbeau; Latin: Barbelum, Sequanae portus, or Sacer portus) is a former Cistercian monastery in Fontaine-le-Port in the French department of Seine-et-Marne. It was located approximately 10 kilometers northeast of Fontainebleau and 8 kilometers southeast of Melun.

== History ==
Barbeau Abbey was founded in 1147 by King Louis VII of France on the banks of the Seine, whence the original name Seine-Port, or Sequanae Portus, in Latin. It was transferred to its present site in 1156. The present name is supposedly derived from the French word for barbel, which is also depicted in the abbey's arms. According to the foundation legend a barbel was fished out of the Seine and found to contain a ring mounted with a precious stone that was lost by Saint Loup as he crossed the river, the sale of which raised the funds to build the monastery.

In 1180 Louis VII was buried in the abbey. His bones were transferred to St. Denis' Abbey in 1817.

The abbey prospered until the Hundred Years' War. In approximately 1420 the monks were driven out of the abbey and spent the next 40 years in Melun. After their return in 1460 the monastery was restored and enlarged. The abbey suffered further damage in the Wars of Religion. Under the commendatory abbot Cardinal Wilhelm Egon von Fürstenberg the church was again restored.

The abbey was suppressed in 1791 during the French Revolution and set on fire in 1793 by the Sansculottes. The state bought the remaining buildings back in 1810 for use as an orphanage, but sold them in 1837 to a private owner who demolished them and built a country house on the site. A riding school now occupies the former site.

== Buildings ==
There are few remains of the abbey apart from an ice-cellar. The church of Fontaine-le-Port has preserved some of the 16th-century wooden sculptures from the abbey church, and a chapel in the same village is also said once to have been the abbey's. The church of Héricy owns an 18th-century altar from the monastery.
