= Basina of Thuringia =

Queen of Thuringia

Basina
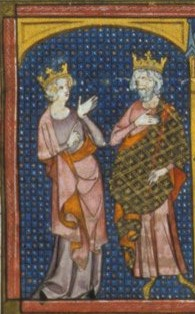
- 13th-century depiction of Basina and Childeric I

Queen of Thuringia
- Tenure: c. 463 – 477
- Born: c. 438
- Died: c. 477 (aged 38–39)
- Husband: Childeric I
- Issue: Clovis I; Audofleda; Lanthilde; Albofledis

Basina or Basine (c. 438 – 477) was remembered as a queen of Thuringia in the middle of the fifth century, by much later authors such as especially Gregory of Tours. However, because Gregory described her family's kingdom of Thuringia as being on the Gaulish or western side of the river Rhine, it is sometimes thought to be the Civitas Tungrorum, which is now Belgium.

== Biography ==
Gregory of Tours reported that Childeric I was exiled from Roman Gaul for a period, and during that time he went to the kingdom of Thuringia. When he returned, Basina came with him, although she had allegedly been married to the king there, Bisinus. She herself took the initiative to ask for the hand of Childeric I, king of the Franks, and married him. For as she herself said, "I want to have the most powerful man in the world, even if I have to cross the ocean for him".

Childeric and Basina were the parents of the Frankish king Clovis I, who is remembered as the first medieval king to rule Gaul.

According to the Gesta episcoporum Cameracensium, the Frankish King Ragnachar, and his brother Richar, from the area of Cambrai were related to Basina.

== Marriage and children ==
In 463, Basina married Childeric I, son of Merovech and his wife, and had the following children:

1. Clovis I (466 – 511)
2. Audofleda (467 – 511) – queen of the Ostrogoths and wife of Theodoric the Great
3. Lantechildis (468 – ?)
4. Albofledis (470 – ?).

== Portrayals ==
Queen Basina of Thuringia is the central antagonist in the 2005 film, The Brothers Grimm.

== See also ==
- Gregory of Tours
