= Childeric I =

5th-century Frankish king

Childeric I *Hildirik
- King or ruler (Latin: rex) of Franks
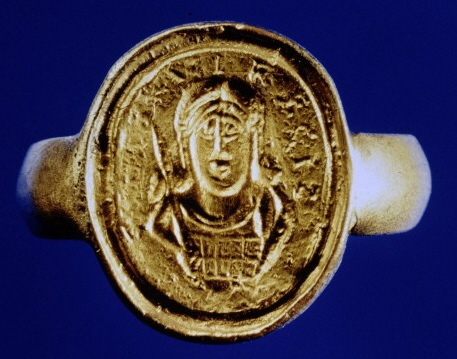
- Copy of the signet ring of Childeric (original stolen in 1831) from his tomb at Tournai. Inscription CHILDIRICI REGIS ("of king Childeric"). (Monnaie de Paris).

King of the Salian Franks
- Reign: ended about 481
- Predecessor: Uncertain (Note: It is uncertain whether his father, Merovech was king before him)
- Successor: Clovis I
- Died: c. 481
- Burial: Tournai (present-day Belgium)
- Spouse: Basina of Thuringia
- Issue: Clovis I; Audofleda; Lanthilde; Albofledis
- Dynasty: Merovingian
- Father: Merovech

Childeric I (died about 481/482 AD) was a 5th-century Frankish ruler in what is now northern France, during the period when this part of Roman Gaul became permanently disconnected from the central Roman government in 461, and the last emperor based in Italy was dethroned in 476. He is the ancestor of the early medieval Merovingian dynasty, and father of Clovis I, who would go on to acquire effective control over all or most of the small Frankish kingdoms of the time, and unite a significant part of formerly Roman Gaul under Frankish rule.

Childeric was described as a king (Latin: rex), both on his Roman-style seal ring, which was buried with him in Tournai, and in fragmentary later records of his life, but scholars have different interpretation of the term rex in northern Gaul in this period. He and the Frankish forces loyal to him seem to have coordinated with forces who fought in the name of Rome, during a period when Roman chains of command were no longer stable. According to a common, but not universally accepted interpretation of a letter written by Saint Remigius, Childeric, or at least one or more of the relatives (parentes) of Clovis, even held an official position within a Roman-style administration in northern Gaul. The family background of Childeric is uncertain but he was reputed to be a descendant of Chlodio, and as a leader of Frankish troops based within the Roman empire he may, like several Gaulish military leaders in his generation, have served when younger under the powerful Roman military leader and statesman Aëtius, who died in 454. His burial site, which has been discovered in Tournai in Belgium, contained a wide range of artefacts, including some which were Roman symbols of authority.

The only definitely near-contemporary source to mention him is the 6th-century History of the Franks of Gregory of Tours, which mentions him twice, once concerning a legend about him spending time in exile, and once in a compressed account of conflicts mainly near the river Loire, which at the time represented a zone of confrontation against the expanding power of the Visigoths in what is now southwestern France. Both of these passages associate Childeric with the Gallo-Roman general Aegidius. Two later works which drew upon Gregory also mention Childeric, the Chronicle of Fredegar, and the Liber Historiae Francorum. They are considered less reliable overall for this period, and many scholars believe they misunderstood Gregory by making Childeric and Aegidius competitors or enemies. However they added information which may reflect other sources which the authors had available. Another brief mention of Childeric which may derive from near-contemporary material is the medieval biography of Saint Genevieve of Paris, the Vita Genovefae. It mentions that Childeric had a great love for the saint, and it portrays him as someone who held military control of the countryside around the Paris region.

== Ancestry and background ==
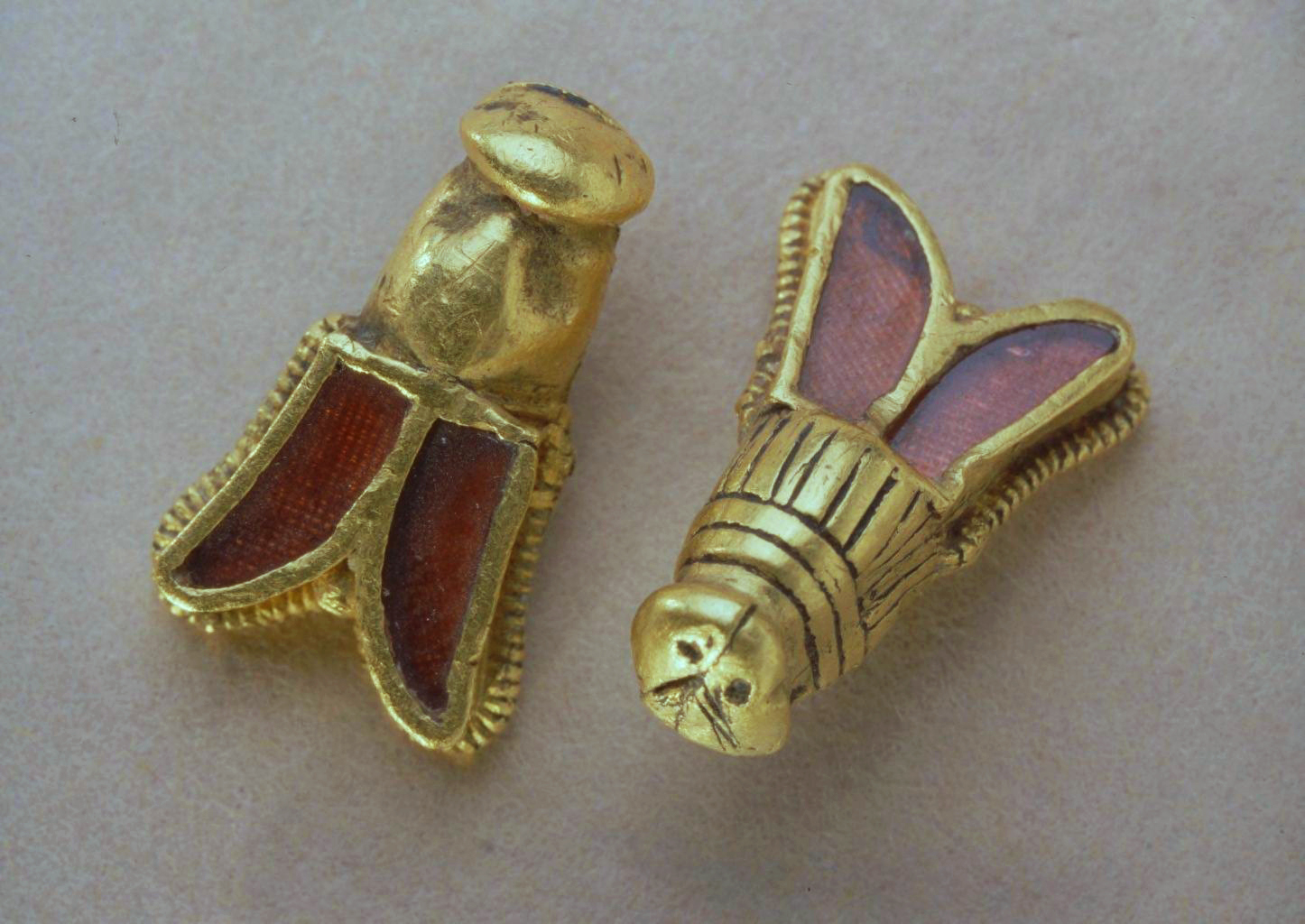
Detail of golden bees with garnet insets

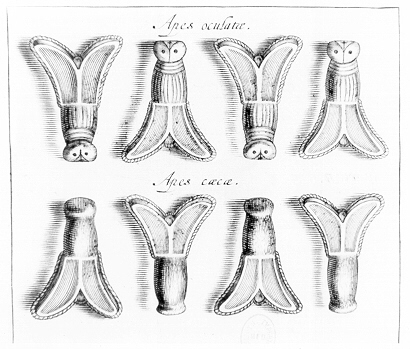
Golden bee or fly jewellery from the tomb of Childeric I in Tournai. Drawn by Jacob van Werden and engraved by Cornelis Galle the Younger

Gregory of Tours, whose 6th-century History of the Franks is one of the only near-contemporary sources to mention Childeric, names the father of Childeric as Merovech. The Merovingian dynasty was named after Merovech but no information about his life has survived. Gregory mentioned that some people in his time said that Merovech was descended from Chlodio, who took control of some Roman populated areas including Cambrai in the early 5th century.

Later medieval sources do not always agree about Childeric's ancestry, including the name of his father. In modern times it has been suggested for example that Childeric descended from Merovech on his mother's side. The Fredegar chronicle (III.10) says that Merovech was born after a sea beast attacked the wife of Chlodio while she was swimming, making it uncertain whether Chlodio or the monster was the father.

It is possible that Childeric is the young Frankish prince who Priscus Panites mentioned as visiting Rome as an ambassador in the period leading up to the Battle of the Catalaunian Plains in 451. Priscus described the prince as just beginning to grow a beard, and as having fair hair flowing over his shoulders. The prince was involved in an inheritance dispute which Attila used as an excuse to invade Gaul. The older brother was supported by Attila, while the younger brother was supported by Rome and even adopted by Aetius, the Roman military leader who defeated Attila in the battle. There were however several Frankish kingdoms at the time, so this is not considered certain.

The Liber Historiae Francorum claims that Childeric ruled 24 years, implying based on normal assumptions about his death date in about 481, that he began his reign in the late 450s. However the accuracy of this source for such information is doubted by scholars.

== Connection to Roman military ==
Although there are very few records of Childeric, several associate him with his contemporary, the Gallo-Roman noble Aegidius, who was assigned as Roman military commander for Gaul (Latin: magister militum per gallias) around 457, when Majorian replaced Avitus as emperor.

Childeric's grave also shows the insignia of a Roman military commander.

Further back in time, some historians such as Guy Halsall have speculated that Childeric was probably old enough to have begun a Roman military career in the service of Flavius Aetius (d. 434), who defeated Attila in Gaul in 451. Halsall notes that Childeric's military career appears to have played out far from the Frankish homelands, in areas where he was fighting for Roman interests.

Aetius died in 454, and was himself strongly associated with the Huns of Attila (died 453) both as an ally, and later as an enemy who he defeated in Gaul in 451 at the Battle of the Catalaunian Plains. Among those who served under Aëtius were the Gallo-Roman emperors Avitus and Majorian, the king-maker Ricimer who had Majorian enthroned in 457, and Aegidius himself, who rejected the legitimacy of the new emperor in Rome after the murder of Majorian by Ricimer in 461—effectively separating northern Gaul from Italian control.

== Exile legend ==
The first and by far the largest of the two parts of Childeric's life which Gregory (II.12) reports is the story of his exile and marriage. He says that as king he was excessively wanton and began to dishonour the daughters of his fellow Franks. They ejected him from his position and wanted to kill him, and so he escaped to "Thuringia" (a term which sometimes seems to represent the Tongeren region in this part of Gregory's work). He left an ally among the Franks to try to calm them and prepare the situation for his return. He and his friend agreed that he would receive a secret signal when the time was right, and Childeric went to stay with king Basinus and his wife, Basina. According to Gregory, it was eight years before Childeric received this signal to return. When he left Thuringia, Basina left her husband to come with Childeric. Gregory narrates: "I know your worth," said she, "and that you are very strong, and therefore I have come to Hve with you. For let me tell you that if I had known of anyone more worthy than you in parts beyond the sea I should certainly have sought to live with him."

The Chronicle of Fredegar names the faithful friend of Childeric as "Wiomad", and says that he was a Frank who had once rescued Childeric by flight when he and his mother were being led away captive by the Huns. The Liber Historiae Francorum calls him Viomad. They tell stories about Wiomad deliberately advising Aegidius to make bad decisions which made him unpopular, so that Childeric could return.

Modern scholars are sceptical of Gregory's report that while Childeric was gone, the Franks elected the Roman commander Aegidius as their "king", in the place of Childeric, but several have speculated that the story may have reflected a memory of something real. For example, the story explains the origins of the mother of Clovis, who appeared in later genealogies.

Guy Halsall proposes that the 8 year period may reflect the span of time when Aegidius led the Roman forces of northern Gaul, from 457 until his death in 465. He also suggested that the story might be connected to the refusal of Aegidius to accept Severus as emperor after the murder of Majorian in 461, putting his Roman position in doubt. Halsall proposed that "to legitimise his position", Aegidius may have taken the Frankish title instead.

Ulrich Nonn, following his teacher Eugen Ewig, believed that the exile story reflects a real sequence of events whereby Childeric was a leader of "Salian" or "Belgian" Franks based in the Romanized areas conquered by Chlodio. They constituted a Roman allied force under the lordship of Aegidius, which he was temporarily able to take over when Chlodio and his imperial patron died.

== Possible conflict with Aegidius ==
It is generally assumed among modern scholars that Childeric had a continuing alliance with Aegidius, although there is very little historical evidence for it. In contrast to modern scholars, the Chronicle of Fredegar and Liber Historiae Francorum both reported that after his return Childeric, he and Aegidius fought battles against each other. Fredegar says that Childeric fought many battles with Aegidius and that many slaughters of Romans were carried out by him. The Liber Historiae Francorum gives the following:

In those days the Franks captured the city of Agrippina on the Rhine, and they called it Cologne, as though coloni inhabited it. They killed many of the Romans belonging to Aegidius’s party there. Aegidius himself escaped by fleeing. They then came to the city of Trier on the river Moselle, devastating those lands, and captured the city after setting it on fire. After these events Aegidius, king of the Romans, died.

In fact there are no clear source which give an exact date for the Frankish takeover of Cologne and Trier.

== The Battle(s) of Orleans (probably about 463) ==
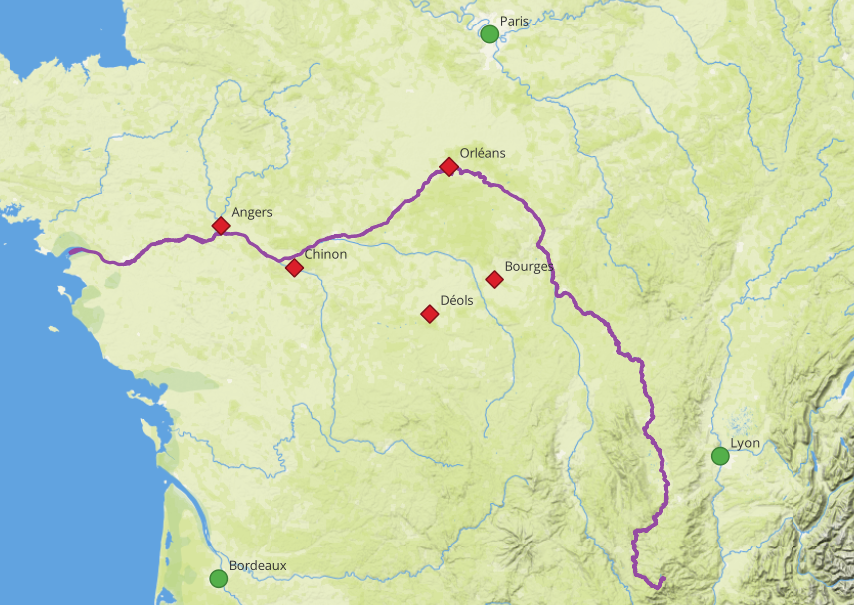
The red diamonds are places relevant to the Battle of Orleans in 463

In a passage normally considered to have come from a lost collection of annals, Gregory (II.18-19) gave a sequence of events which are very difficult to interpret. Modern scholars consider it to be "only loosely connected to together, and ambiguous in terms of chronology and cause and effect".

In the first part, Childeric is said to have been in battle at Orleans. This is generally equated to the Battle of Orléans (463), which other sources (Hydatius, Marius of Avranches, and the Gallic Chronicle of 511) all report as a battle where Frederic, the brother of the Visigothic king Theoderic II, was killed fighting Aegidius and the Franks, although none of these sources mention Childeric. It then lists several other events including the death of Aegidius which is known from other sources to have happened about 465. The passage begins as follows:

II.18. Igitur Childericus Aurilianis pugnas egit,	Now Childeric fought battles at Orleans,
Adovacrius vero cum Saxonibus Andecavo venit.	while Adovacrius came with the Saxons to Angers.
Magna tunc lues populum devastavit.	At that time a great plague devastated the people.
Mortuus est autem Egidius et reliquit filium Syagrium nomine.	Aegidius died and left a son named Syagrius.
Quo defuncto, Adovacrius de Andecavo vel aliis locis obsedes accepit.	After his [Aegidius'] death, Adovacrius received hostages from Angers and from other places.

This battle of Orleans was part of the Gothic war against Aegidius, in which the Visigoths are believed to have attacked Aegidius in northern Gaul as allies of the Roman king-maker Ricimer and his puppet emperor Libius Severus, who granted the Visigoths the coastal region of Narbonne. The other sources report what appears to be the same conflict as follows:

- The Gallic Chronicle of 511 says that Frederic died near the Loire, and specifies that he was fighting Franks.
- The chronicle of Marius of Avenches specifies that Frederic died in a battle against Aegidius and Franks, near Orleans, between Loire and Loiret.
- Hydatius reported the death of Frederic in a set of entries under a heading for the year 461, but where the headings for the years 462-464 are not marked. It said that Frederic the brother of King Theoderic, rose up against Aegidius, count of both branches of the military service. Both he and the people with him were killed. This happened in the Armorican region, which in this period was the region between the Loire and Seine.
- Later in the same series of 461-464 entries by Hydatius one entry notes that "on the thirteenth day before the Kalends of August, a Monday, the sun was seen diminished" which is an eclipse dated to 464. Soon after this an entry says that Aegidius died "some say by ambush or treachery, others that he was deceived by poison. When he was gone, the Goths soon invaded the regions which he had been defending in the Roman name".

MacGeorge has however noted that the "usual reconstruction amalgamates all these notices to create the 'Battle of Orleans', won by Aegidius and Frankish allies, or federates, under Childeric", which is then "adduces as proof of an alliance between Aegidius and Childeric (often extended to Syagrius)". However, she gives several reasons that this amalgamation has been doubted by some scholars.

The passage also twice mentions Adovacrius implying that he led Saxons to the Angers area before the battle in Orleans, and started taking hostages after the death of Aegidius.

== Battle near Bourges (probably about 469) ==
In the next part of the passage, a battle between Goths and Britons is reported near Bourges, which is south of Orleans and the Loire. Childeric is not specifically mentioned, but another leader named Count Paul seems to have been leading Frankish and Romans forces.

Brittani de Bituricas a Gothis expulsi sunt, multis apud Dolensim vicum peremptis.	The Britons were driven out of the territory of the Bituriges by the Goths, many having been killed near the village of Déols.
Paulos vero comes cum Romanis ac Francis Gothis bella intulit et praedas egit.	Count Paul, meanwhile, together with Romans and Franks, made war on the Goths and took booty.

As a count (comes) Paul is clearly a Roman office holder, but he is unknown from any other record. He is mentioned first leading Roman and Frankish forces in the Loire region against the Visigoths, who were not yet mentioned in this passage. The Goths who he attacked and plundered, together with Romans and Franks, are normally presumed to be the Goths who had fought the Britons, mentioned in the previous line. Conflict between Goths and Britons based near the Loire is reported in other sources, which give an indication of the likely date:

- A letter from Sidonius Apollinaris to his friend Vincentius, written about 468 AD, records that Roman officials intercepted a letter written by the Praetorian Prefect of Gaul, Arvandus, to the Visigothic king Euric stating that "the Britons stationed beyond the Loire should be attacked" and that the Visigoths and Burgundians should divide Gaul between them.
- Jordanes in the 6th century reported that the Gothic king Euric (reigned 466-484) saw that the Roman emperors were weak and developed an ambition to rule all of Gaul. The emperor Anthemius (reigned 467-472) reacted by calling for help from Britons led by King Riothamus who came with a force of 12,000 men by boat and was stationed at the civitas of the Bituriges, around Bourges - which corresponds to the region where Gregory mentions the Goths defeating Britons. Like Gregory, Jordanes reports that the Goths defeated the Britons, saying that Riothamus "lost a great part of his army, he fled with all the men he could gather together". Gregory also notes that the Britons had been waiting for Roman support which did not arrive in time.

These events are normally dated to the period around 469 during the Gothic revolt of Euric, when the Visigoths made a new attempt to expand their territory into northern Gaul, although the new Roman emperor Anthemius was opposed to them. John of Antioch (fragment Mariev 229) reported that "the Gothic people who were living in western Gaul and who were of old named after Alaric", began hostilities at the same time as the Goths of Theodemir in Pannonia, and the Tzani in Trapezus. Déols is near modern Chateauroux, south of Bourges, and both are south of Orleans and would not have been "beyond the Loire".

Although modern scholars tend to interpret the passage to mean that Aegidius, Count Paul and Childeric were leaders on the same side, both the Chronicle of Fredegar and the Liber Historiae Francorum interpreted Gregory to mean that Childeric killed Count Paul, and as historian Edward James has pointed out "there were at least two factions among the Romans, and Paul's Romans were not necessarily Aegidius's Romans, nor, indeed, was Childeric ever necessary an ally of Aegidius".

== Battle in Angers (possibly c. 470) ==
Next in the listing of events given by Gregory is a battle at Angers with the Saxons who had been previously mentioned. The chronology is not clear, but Count Paul is mentioned in both. It is possible that these events immediately followed the fighting at Bourges.

Veniente vero Adovacrio Andecavus, Childericus rex sequenti die advenit	When Adovacrius came to Angers, King Childeric arrived on the following day;
interemptoque Paulo comite, civitatem obtinuit.	Count Paul having been killed, he took possession of the city.
Magno ea die incendio domus ecclesiae concremata est.	On that day, the house of the church was consumed by a great fire.
II.19. His itaque gestis, inter Saxones atque Romanos bellum gestum est:	After these events, war was fought between the Saxons and the Romans.
sed Saxones terga vertentes, multos de suis, Romanis insequentibus, gladio reliquerunt;	But the Saxons turned their backs and fled, and, as the Romans pursued them, they left many of their own men to the sword.
insulae eorum cum multo populo interempto, a Francis captae atque subversae sunt.	Their islands were captured and laid waste by the Franks, with many of the people killed.
Eo anno mense nono terra tremuit.	In that year, in the ninth month, the earth trembled.

The Saxons were under a leader named "Adovacrius", sometimes given by modern authors in an Anglo-Saxon spelling form, Eadwacer, or in a spelling the same as used for his contemporary the future King of Italy Odoacer, with whom he is sometimes equated. The origin of both the "Saxons" is however unclear. They may have come from Britain, and may have been coordinating with the Goths who were also mentioned in the same passage. Concerning their island bases Halsall has noted that "whether these are in the Loire, such as were used by the Vikings later on, or off the coast of Gaul is also unclear".

== Alliance with Odoacer after 476 ==
In the final line of this short passage mentioning Angers, Gregory of Tours (II.19) then reports that Odovacrius (with spelling variants Odovacrus and Adovachrius in different manuscripts), entered into an alliance with Childeric, and they subdued the Alamanni, who had overrun part of Italy. Earlier in the passage Adovacrius (with variants Adovagrius and Odovacrio), had led the Saxon forces in Angers. Many scholars see this a record of an alliance between Childeric and Odoacer who became ruler of Italy after 476. This has in turn led to uncertainty and disagreement among scholars because of the mention of "Adovacrius" leading Saxons in the same passage, which apparently means Gregory saw them as the same person.

Many historians over the years have remained open to the idea that Adovacrius and Odovacrius are the same person, and that he really did spend time fighting near both Angers and Italy. The PLRE equates both with Odoacer who "may have gone to Gaul to seek his fortune after the death of Attila and the break-up of the Hun empire" and notes that he "apparently became leader of a group of Saxons in Gaul". Krautschick proposed that in 463 Odoacar would have been old enough to lead a warband, and if he had fought for Attila on the Catalaunian Plains in 451, he may have made his way from there to the Saxons. Alternatively, as the son of a high-ranking Hunnic dignitary, he could have begun working with the Saxons as part of a commission under Attila, who lived until 453. Matthias Springer noted that Odoacer the future king of Italy is often understood to have had an ancestral connection to the early Thuringians, and these in turn were not yet clearly distinguished from the Saxons to their north in the 5th century. He argued that this could explain the connection between the young Odoacer and a group of Saxons. Krautschick on the other hand noted that Gregory of Tours never says that this Adovacrius was himself a Saxon.

Some scholars such as MacGeorge have denied that Gregory saw these entries as describing the same person, citing the spelling variations found in various manuscripts as evidence. She noted that in "virtually all the manuscripts" the name in chapter 18 is spelled with an "A" and in chapter 19 with an "O". She also emphasized that Gregory divided the material into two sections, II.18 and II.19 in modern editions, arguing that while II.18 and II.19 were linked by Gregory, this is only "because they referred to conflicts in the same region, and because both mentioned Childeric". Her position has been accepted by other historians such as Halsall. Others have criticized this reasoning. Krautschick felt that the name represented by both spellings was not common enough to make it likely that there were two of them at the same time.

Other historians have accepted that the text is intended to refer to one person, but argued that the text has been badly corrupted, and Italy and the Alamanni should not have been mentioned at all. Bachrach for example interprets these Alemanni to be a mistaken reference to the Alans, a people established in the Loire region in this period, despite the mention of Italy. In 1988 James noted that many scholars assumed that the Alamanni mentioned in this passage must in fact be Alans, who had a settlement in the Loire region, "on the grounds that Childeric could hardly have been fighting in Italy". However, as most scholars presumed Adovacrius and Odovacrius to be the same person, and the second one is "almost certainly" the ruler of Italy, he argued that the passage shows that Childeric was playing a political role within what was left of the Roman empire.

== Political status of Childeric after the death of Aegidius (465) ==
After the death of Aegidius in 465 it is more unclear how political power in Northern Gaul was divided between various figures such as Childeric, or how many leaders there were. There was clearly more than one Roman (civitas) (city district) which was ruled by a king—Gregory mentioned several Frankish kings of cities such as Ragnachar in Cambrai. Also, apart from Syagrius the son of Aegidius who ruled as "king of Romans" in Soissons two letters from contemporary Romans mention a Roman named Arbogast, based in Trier, who is referred to in one letter with the Roman title of comes (count), even though the other letter mentions that Roman law is no longer in effect around Trier. Childeric on the other hand was not associated with a specific city in contemporary documents, even though archaeological evidence shows that he was buried in Tournai.

Edward James has argued strongly for taking the idea seriously that Childeric was not just the ruler of one city, but someone with a bigger role, recognized not only by the Frankish population but also by Roman populations. One aspect of this is Childeric's alliance with Odoacer, who continued to rule as a Roman patrician in Italy, recognizing the Eastern Emperor in Constantinople.

Another line of evidence for Childeric's importance in northern Gaul is the biography of Saint Genevieve describes Childeric as king of the Frankish nations (gentiles Childericus rex francorum), and an important person in the context of the Paris region. Although this source was once believed to have been written much later, scholars now believe that some versions contain material from the early 6th century. Karl Ferdinand Werner argues the biography shows that, when considering the relative importance of Childeric and Syagrius, "for a prolonged period, Childeric exercised an authority which threatened Syagrius’ position not far from Paris. This was not a “barbarian” attack against the “Romans”; it merely expressed the fact that Childeric, recognised directly by Odoacer, no longer recognised Syagrius’ authority. Syagrius established his residence at Soissons: this move, intended to isolate the Franks to the north-east of this strategic stronghold, confirms that Syagrius had brought Romano-Frankish cooperation to an end" (translated from French).

As further evidence James, along with many other historians, has emphasized that that a letter by Saint Remigius to Clovis seems to indicate that his relatives had administered the Roman province of Belgica Secunda which included Tournai, Cambrai, Reims, and Soissons. This reading of the letter has however been questioned. The Latin only says administrationem uos secunduṁ bellicė suscepisse; non est nouum · ut coeperis esse sicut parentes tui semper fuerunt, and Woudhuysen and Barrett translate this as "you have undertaken the waging of another war [or perhaps "a successful war"]; it is not a novelty, for you have been just as your kin always were". There is for example no mention of Belgica in the original, and no explicit mention of Childeric. Halsall has also pointed out that one powerful relative of Clovis who is explicitly mentioned by Gregory of Tours is Ragnachar, who was king of Cambrai until Clovis killed him.

== Marriage, children, and death ==
Gregory of Tours, in his History of the Franks, mentions several siblings of Clovis within his narrative, apparently thus children of Childeric:

1. Clovis I (died 511), whose mother was Basina.
2. Audofleda, Queen of the Ostrogoths, wife of Theodoric the Great. Gregory III.31 also mentions their daughter Amalasuntha.
3. Lanthechild. Gregory II.31 mentions she had been an Arian but converted to Catholicism with Clovis.
4. Albofleda (died approximately 500). Gregory II.31 mentions that she died soon after being baptized with Clovis.

Childeric is generally considered to have died in 481 or 482 based on Gregory's report (II.43) that his son Clovis had ruled 30 years when he died about 511.

== Tomb ==
Childeric's tomb was discovered in 1653 not far from the 12th-century church of Saint-Brice in Tournai, now in Belgium. Numerous precious objects were found, including jewels of gold and garnet cloisonné, gold coins, a gold bull's head, and a ring with the king's name inscribed. Also present were some 300 golden winged insects (usually viewed as bees or cicadas), which had been placed on the king's cloak. Archduke Leopold William, governor of the Southern Netherlands (today's Belgium), had the find published in Latin. The treasure went first to the Habsburgs in Vienna, then as a gift to King Louis XIV, who was not impressed with the treasure and stored it in the royal library, which became the Bibliothèque Nationale de France during the Revolution.

On the night of 5–6 November 1831, the treasure of Childeric was among 80 kg of treasure stolen from the Library and melted down for the gold. A few pieces were retrieved from where they had been hidden in the Seine, including two of the bees. The record of the treasure, however, now exists only in the fine engravings made at the time of its discovery and in some reproductions made for the Habsburgs.

=== Origin of Napoleonic bees ===
When Napoleon was looking for a heraldic symbol to trump the Capetian fleur-de-lys, he settled on Childeric's bees as symbols of the French Empire. The minutes of a meeting of the Conseil d'État held at Saint-Cloud in June 1804 suggest that it approved the symbolism of the bees on a suggestion by Cambacérès. The design was made by Vivant Denon, Director of the Louvre.

== Bibliography ==
- Cameron, Alan (1988). "Flavius: a Nicety of Protocol". Latomus. 47 (1): 26–33. JSTOR 41540754.
- Collins, Roger (1999). Early Medieval Europe: 300–1000 (Second ed.). New York: St. Martin's Press. ISBN 0-312-21886-9.
- Halsall, Guy (2007). Barbarian Migrations and the Roman West 376-568. Cambridge University Press. ISBN 978-0-521-43543-7.
- Halsall, Guy (2010), "Commentary Three: Once More Unto Saint-Brice", In: Cemeteries and Society in Merovingian Gaul, Brill's Series on the Early Middle Ages, vol. 18, Brill, pp. 188–197, doi:10.1163/ej.9789004179998.i-422.40, ISBN 9789047444299
- Heather, Peter (2006). The Fall of the Roman Empire: A New History of Rome and the Barbarians. Oxford, UK: Oxford University Press. ISBN 978-0-19-532541-6.
- James, Edward (1988). The Franks. Basil Blackwell. ISBN 0-631-17936-4.
- Krautschick, Stefan (1986), "Zwei Aspekte des Jahres 476", Historia: Zeitschrift für Alte Geschichte, 35 (3): 344–371, JSTOR 4435971
- MacGeorge, Penny (2002). Late Roman Warlords. Oxford: Oxford University Press. ISBN 978-0-199-25244-2.
- Martindale, John R., ed. (1980). The Prosopography of the Later Roman Empire: Volume II, AD 395–527. Cambridge: Cambridge University Press. ISBN 0-521-20159-4.
- Callandar Murray, Alexander (2000). From Romans to Merovingian Gaul. Higher Education University of Toronto Press.
- Nonn, Ulrich (2010). Die Franken. Kohlhammer Verlag. ISBN 978-3-17-017814-4.
- Perin, Patrick. "Empreintes inédites de l'annaeau sigillaire de Childéric Ier". Antiquités nationales 39, 2008.
- Renard, Étienne (2014), "Le sang de Mérovée. 'Préhistoire' de la dynastie et du royaume mérovingiens", Revue belge de Philologie et d'Histoire, 92–94: 999–1039
- Reynolds, Robert L.; Lopez, Robert S. (1946). "Odoacer: German or Hun?". The American Historical Review. 52 (1): 36–53. doi:10.1086/ahr/52.1.36. JSTOR 1845067.
- Springer, Matthias (2004). Die Sachsen (in German). Kohlhammer Verlag. ISBN 978-3-17-023227-3.
- Wallace-Hadrill, J. M. (1982). The Long-Haired Kings. Toronto: University of Toronto Press. ISBN 0-8020-6500-7.
- Werner, Karl Ferdinand (1996), "La "conquête franque" de la Gaule : itinéraires historiographiques d'une erreur", Bibliothèque de l'école des chartes, 154 (1): 7–45, doi:10.3406/bec.1996.450809
- Wickham, Chris (2009). The Inheritance of Rome: Illuminating the Dark Ages 400–1000. New York: Penguin Books. ISBN 978-0-14-311742-1.
- Wood, Ian (1994). The Merovingian Kingdoms 450-751. Routledge. ISBN 978-0-582-49372-8.
- Woudhuysen, George; Barrett, Graham (2016), "Remigius and the 'Important News' of Clovis Rewritten", Antiquité Tardive, 24: 471–500, doi:10.1484/J.AT.5.112639

== Notes ==
Childeric I Merovingian dynasty Born: c. 437 Died: 481
Preceded by Merovech	King of the Salian Franks; 458–481	Succeeded by Clovis I
