= Margaret of France, Queen of England and Hungary =

Queen of England, Hungary and Croatia (1158–1197)

Margaret of France
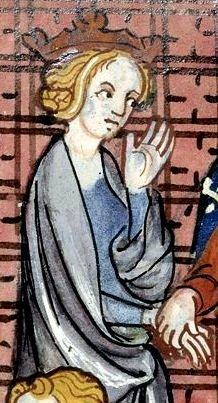
- Detail of Margaret from the 14th century Chroniques de France ou de St Denis

Junior Queen consort of England
- Tenure: 27 August 1172 – 11 June 1183
- Coronation: 27 August 1172 (Winchester Cathedral)

Queen consort of Hungary and Croatia
- Tenure: 1186 – 23 April 1196
- Born: 1158
- Died: 18 September 1197 (aged 38–39); St John of Acre
- Burial: Cathedral of Tyre
- Spouse: Henry the Young King (m. 1172; died 1183) Béla III of Hungary (m. 1186; died 1196)
- Issue: William
- House: Capet
- Father: Louis VII of France
- Mother: Constance of Castile

Margaret of France (French: Marguerite, Hungarian: Margit; 1158 – 18 September 1197) was junior Queen of England by marriage to Henry the Young King until his death in 1183, and Queen of Hungary and Croatia by marriage to Béla III of Hungary from 1186.

== Family history ==
Margaret was the eldest daughter of Louis VII of France by his second wife Constance of Castile. Her older half-sisters, Marie and Alix, were also older half-sisters of her future husband.

She was betrothed to Henry the Young King on 2 November 1160, who was actually the son of Eleanor of Aquitaine who was previously married to Margaret's father, Louis VII of France. Henry was the second son of King Henry II of England and Eleanor of Aquitaine. He was five years old at the time of this agreement while Margaret was about two. Margaret's dowry was the vital and much disputed territory of Vexin.

== Queen of England ==
Margaret's husband became co-ruler with his father in 1170. Because Archbishop Thomas Becket was in exile, Margaret was not crowned along with her husband on 14 July 1170. This omission and the coronation being handled by a surrogate greatly angered her father. To please the French King, Henry II had his son and Margaret crowned together in Winchester Cathedral on 27 August 1172. When Margaret became pregnant, she held her confinement in Paris, where she gave birth prematurely to their only son William on 19 June 1177, who died three days later on 22 June. She had no further children, possibly due to infertility resulting from this birth.

Her husband, Henry the Young King was generally well liked, but also highly impressionable and took part in a family rebellion against his father, King Henry II. Henry II's other sons and Queen Eleanor of Aquitaine took part in the rebellion, but it is unknown Margaret's part. She may have sided with her husband and mother-in-law, in regard to her husband's powerlessness and landless position. After the rebellion, both Queen Eleanor and Junior Queen Margaret were powerless.

Margaret was accused in 1182 of having a love affair with William Marshal, 1st Earl of Pembroke, although contemporary chroniclers doubted the truth of these accusations. Henry the Young King may have started the process to have their marriage annulled ostensibly due to her adultery, or possibly due to the lack of children. The Young King's hesitation to act showed he was caught between believing and doubting the rumors, although due to her known piousness and lack of chroniclers hinting at a soiled reputation, it is likely that she was innocent of these charges of infidelity. Margaret was sent back to France, according to E. Hallam (The Plantagenets) and Amy Kelly (Eleonore of Aquitaine and the Four Kings), to ensure her safety during the civil war with Young Henry's brother Richard the Lionheart. Her husband died in 1183 while on campaign in the Dordogne region of France. The coronet he and she would have worn was chronicled in about 1218 as "the traditional ring-of-roses coronet of the house of Anjou". Margaret may have taken her coronet to Hungary in 1186 when she married King Bela III. A ring-of-roses coronet was discovered in a convent grave in Budapest in 1838, which may be the same one.

== Queen of Hungary ==
After receiving a substantial pension in exchange for surrendering her dowry of Gisors and the Vexin, Margaret became the second wife of Béla III of Hungary in 1186. Béla III was searching for a wife and had heard of her piety and wisdom. As Queen of Hungary, she played a political role in 1189 by acting as a mediator to restore peace between Béla and his younger brother Géza, whom Béla had imprisoned as a contender for the throne. She helped intervene and settle the dispute between the brothers. Margaret's marriage to Béla III was also childless, but it did not cause any contention as Béla already had many children from his first marriage.

She was widowed for a second time in 1196. With no nearby male relative, and no heir, she went to the Holy Land and died on pilgrimage at St John of Acre in 1197, having only arrived eight days prior to her death. (Note: "The Chronicle of Ernoul records the arrival of une reine en Hongrie...veve sans hoir at Tyre [in 1197] and her death eight days later, specifying that she was the sister of the mother of Henri Comte de Champagne King of Jerusalem and had been feme...le jouene roi d'Englietere…et suer…le roi Phelippe de France") She was buried at the Cathedral of Tyre, according to Ernoul, the chronicler who continued the chronicles of William of Tyre.

== Sources ==
- Baldwin, John W. (2005). "Chrétien in History". In Lacy, Norris J.; Grimbert, Joan Tasker (eds.). A Companion to Chrétien de Troyes. DS Brewer.
- Laszlovszky, József (2016). "Local Tradition or European Patterns? The grave of Gertrude in the Pilis Cistercian Abbey". In Jaritz, Gerhard; Szende, Katalin (eds.). Medieval East Central Europe in a Comparative Perspective. Routledge.
- de Mas Latrie, Louis, ed. (1871). "XXVI". Chronique d'Ernoul et de Bernard le Trésorier (in French). Libraire de la Societie de L'Histoire de France.
- Pellérdi, M., (2023). Margaret of France: conciliator queen of England and Hungary. In Norrie, A., Harris, C., Laynesmith, J.L., Messer, D. R., & Woodacre, E., (Eds.). Norman to early Plantagenet consorts: power, influence, and dynasty (pp. 139-157). Palgrave Macmillan.
- Warren, W. L. (1973). Henry II. University of California Press.

Margaret of France, Queen of England and Hungary House of Capet Cadet branch of the Robertian dynasty Born: 1157 Died: 1197
Royal titles
Preceded by Eleanor of Aquitaine as sole consort	Queen consort of the English; 27 August 1172 – 11 June 1183; Served alongside: Eleanor of Aquitaine	Succeeded by Eleanor of Aquitaine as sole consort
Vacant Title last held by Agnes of Antioch	Queen consort of Hungary; 1186–1196	Vacant Title next held by Constance of Aragon
