= Jim Bradbury =

British military historian (1937–2023)

- Born: James Bradbury; 27 February 1937; Hackney, London, England
- Died: 19 January 2023 (aged 85)
- Occupation: Historian
- Writing career
- Subject: Medieval warfare

James Bradbury (27 February 1937 – 19 January 2023) was a British historian specialising in the military history of the Middle Ages.

== Life ==
Bradbury was born in East London, the eldest of four to Sarah (née Joel) and George Bradbury. He attended Gayhurst Primary School and Dame Alice Owen's School, before going on to graduate with a Bachelor of Arts (BA) and a Master of Arts (MA) in History, both from King's College London. He then pursued a teaching qualification at the Institute of Education.

After teaching at comprehensive schools, Bradbury began lecturing in history at Borough Road College (later Brunel University) in the 1960s.

In 1958, Bradbury married Ann Hooper. They had three children, Stephen, Jane, and Derek, the latter of whom died in infancy. The family settled in Selsey, where Bradbury would commute from to London for work until his retirement in 1989. In his spare time, he was a trumpet player and a painter. Bradbury died in January 2023, at the age of 85.

== Selected works ==
- (1975) Shakespeare and his Theatre, Longman, ISBN 0-582-20539-5
- (1985) The Medieval Archer, The Boydell Press, ISBN 0-85115-194-9
- (1988) Introduction to The Buckinghamshire Domesday, Alecto Historical Editions, ISBN 0-948459-86-7
- (1992) The Medieval Siege, The Boydell Press, ISBN 1-85285-528-2
- (1996) Stephen and Matilda: Civil War of 1139-53, Sutton Publishing, ISBN 0-7509-0612-X
- (1997) Philip Augustus: King of France, 1180-1223, Longman, ISBN 0-582-06058-3
- (1998) The Battle of Hastings, Sutton Publishing, ISBN 0-7509-1291-X
- (2004) The Routledge Companion to Medieval Warfare, London: Routledge, ISBN 0-415-22126-9
- (2007) The Capetians: Kings of France 987-1314, Hambledon Continuum, ISBN 1-85285-528-2
- (2010) Robin Hood, Amberley Publishing, ISBN 978-1-84868-185-9
- (2021) The Battle of Hastings: The Fall of the Anglo-Saxons and the Rise of the Normans, New York: Pegasus Books, ISBN 978-1-64313-632-5

=== Collaborations ===
With Matthew Bennett, Kelly DeVries, Ian Dickie, Phyllis Jestice:

- (2005) Fighting Techniques of the Medieval World, UK:Amber Books, ISBN 1-86227-299-9
