= Audofleda =

Queen of the Ostrogoths
- Tenure: 493 – 511
- Born: c. 467
- Died: c. 511 (aged 43–44); Ravenna, Ostrogothic Kingdom
- Spouse: Theodoric the Great
- Issue: Amalasuntha
- Dynasty: Merovingian
- Father: Childeric I
- Mother: Basina of Thuringia
- Religion: Arianism

Audofleda (c. 467 – c. 511), was a Gothic queen of the Ostrogothic Kingdom by marriage to Theoderic the Great.

== Life ==
She was the sister of Clovis I, King of the Franks. She married Theoderic the Great, King of the Ostrogoths (471–526), around 493 (exact date unknown). Theoderic sent an embassy to Clovis to request the marriage. This political move allied Theoderic with the Franks, and by marrying his daughters off to the kings of the Burgundians, the Vandals, and the Visigoths, he allied himself with every major 'Barbarian' kingdom in the West.

Audofleda was a pagan prior to her marriage, and was baptised at the time of her wedding by an Arian bishop. Theoderic and Audofleda had one daughter, Amalasuintha, who ruled the Ostrogoths from 526 until 534.
