= W. L. Warren =

20th-century British historian of the Middle Ages

Wilfred Lewis Warren (24 August 1929 – 19 July 1994) was a historian of medieval England. Educated at Exeter College, Oxford, he worked as a professor of modern (post-classical) history and dean of theology at the Queen's University, Belfast. His field of interest was Norman and Angevin England, on which he published several major works. In 1956 he received a doctorate in 14th-century English church history. He was fascinated by and well versed in Ulster politics.

== Select publications ==
- King John. London: Eyre & Spottiswoode. 1961. Yale edition 1997
- Henry II. New Haven: Yale University Press. 1973. ISBN 0-300-08474-9.
- The Governance of Norman and Angevin England, 1086–1272. London: Edward Arnold. 1987. ISBN 0-7131-6378-X.
