= Gambrinus =

Culture hero of European legend, celebrated as an icon of beer

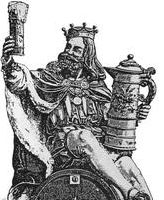
Gambrinus in kingly garb sits casually on a beer cask as he regards a foaming chalice and balances a large pitcher on his thigh. An illustration from the catalogue of Ernst Holzweißig Nachf. (1898)

Gambrinus (/ɡæmˈbraɪnəs/ gam-BRY-nəs; German: [ɡamˈbʁiːnʊs]) is a legendary European culture hero celebrated as an icon of beer, brewing, joviality, and joie de vivre. Typical representations in the visual arts depict him as a rotund, bearded duke or king, holding a tankard or mug, and sometimes with a keg nearby.

Though sometimes erroneously called a patron saint, Gambrinus is neither a saint nor a tutelary deity. It is possible his persona was conflated with traditional medieval saints associated with beermaking, like Saint Arnold of Soissons. In one legendary tradition, he is beer's inventor or envoy. Although legend attributes to him no special powers to bless brews or to make crops grow, tellers of old tall tales are happy to adapt them to fit Gambrinus. Gambrinus stories use folklore motifs common to European folktales, such as the trial by ordeal. Some imagine Gambrinus as a man who has an enormous capacity for drinking beer.

Personages theorised as the basis for the Gambrinus character include the legendary ancient Germanic king Gambrivius (or Gampar) son of Mers (Marsus), John the Fearless of Burgundy (1371–1419) and John I, Duke of Brabant (c. 1252–1294).

== Origin of Gambrinus ==
The source of the legend of Gambrinus is uncertain. An early written account, by German historian Johannes Aventinus (1477–1534), identifies Gambrinus with Gambrivius, a mythical Germanic king about whom little is known. Two other men purported to have inspired the creation of Gambrinus are John I, Duke of Brabant, and John the Fearless, Duke of Burgundy.

=== Gambrivius or Gampar ===
In his magnum opus Annals of Bavaria, German historian Johannes Aventinus wrote that Gambrinus is based on a mythical Germanic king called Gambrivius, or Gampar, who, Aventinus says, learned brewing from Osiris and Isis. In 1517, William IV, Duke of Bavaria had made Aventinus the official historiographer of his dukedom. Aventinus finished composing the history in 1523; the work that he compiled, Annals of Bavaria, extends beyond Bavaria, drawing on numerous ancient and medieval sources. However, it is also a work that blends history with myth and legend.

Legends tell that Gambrivius learned the art of brewing from Osiris (left) and Isis (right).

European anecdote credits Gambrinus with the invention of beer. Aventinus attempted to reconcile this account with much older stories attributing its origin to Osiris' agricultural teachings. In Aventinus' chronicle, Gambrivius was the paramour of Osiris' wife and sister, Isis. It was by this association, he says, that Gambrivius learned the science of brewing (cf. myths of the theft of fire).

Aventinus' account of Gambrivius contributed to the reverence for Osiris and Isis held by 17th-century European scholars. Perceiving Osiris and Isis as "culture bearers" enabled a willingness to see historical connections where there were none.

The 59th stanza of the English drinking ode "The Ex-ale-tation of Ale", written by Peter Mews, evidences a British appropriation of the myth:

To the praise of Gambrivius, that good British king
That devis'd for the nation by the Welshmen's tale
Seventeen hundred years before Christ did spring
The happy invention of a pot of good ale.

— Previously erroneously attributed to Francis Beaumont, A Select Collection of English Songs with Their Original Airs, Volume II

According to Aventinus, Gambrivius is a seventh-generation descendant of the Biblical patriarch Noah. By incorporating earlier myths recorded by Tacitus, Aventinus reckoned that Gambrivius was the fifth son of Marso (Latin: Marsus), who was the great-grandson of Tuisto, the giant or godly ancestor of the Germanic peoples whom Tacitus mentions in Germania. Tacitus alludes to an earlier source (Strabo) who lists tribes called the Gambrivii and the Marsi among the peoples descended from Tuisto: the offspring or subjects of Gambrivius and Marsus, respectively.

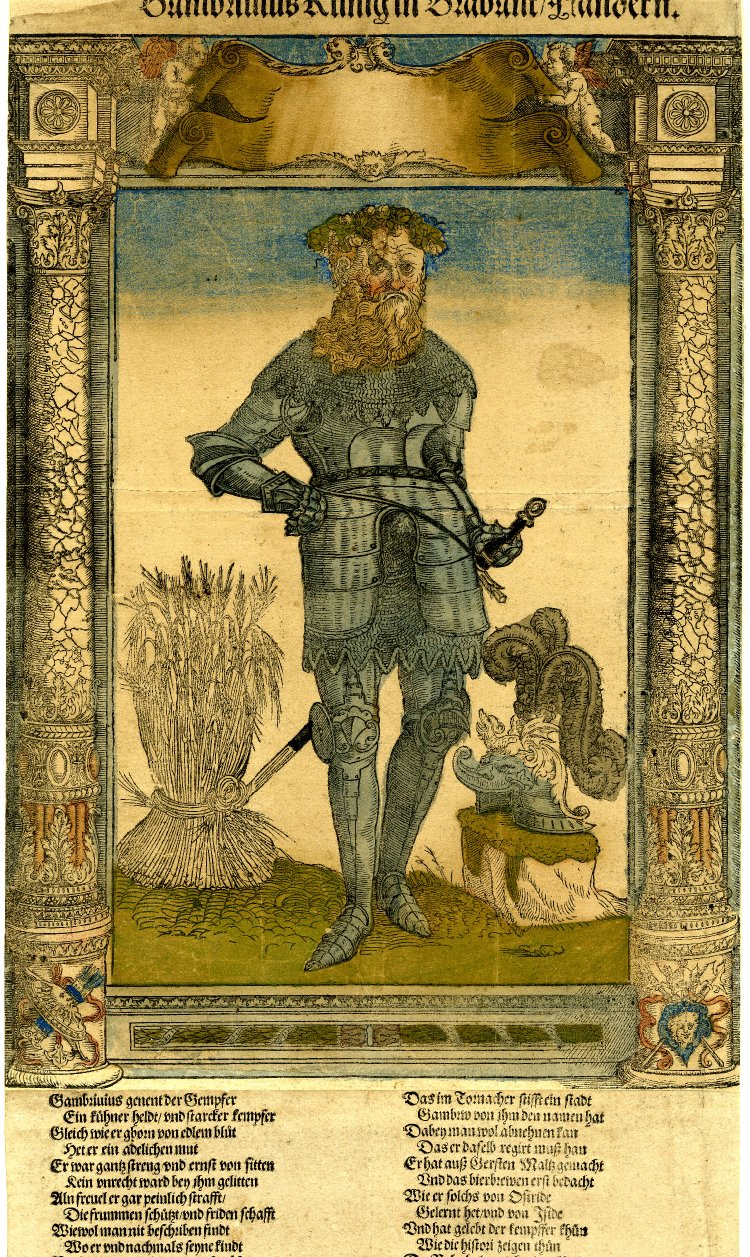
Gampar (Gambrivius), depicted as the king of Flanders and Brabant. A sheaf of wheat is to his right. (From a series of broadsides produced c. 1543.)

Gampar claims new lands east of the Rhine, including Flanders and Brabant, and founds the towns of Cambrai and Hamburg. The names of both these towns were theorized to be cognates of Gambrivius, as one of Hamburg's ancient Latin names was alleged to be Gambrivium.

One of Aventinus' sources was Officina (1503), an encyclopedia compiled by French scholar Jean Tixier de Ravisi. This work purported that Tuisto and Gambrivius were giants descended from Noah. But Jean Tixier had only catalogued and reported a conjecture made in the name of the Hellenistic-era historian Berossus, by the fraudster Annio da Viterbo (1498), who had previously used the same hypothesis to postulate an ancestry for the Gauls.

Some Francophone and Germanophone scholars reject the others' claim to Gambrinus as an appropriation of one of their own cultural heroes. Aventinus' account did not just establish a claim to Gambrivius, but to a glorious ancestry and heritage. The myths also reimagined Gambrivius as a catalyst for the enlargement of the territory of a Germanic people (the Gambrivii), and made him a divine conduit into Germania for the Egyptians' ancient beer lore.

In 1543, Hans Guldenmundt published a series of 12 broadside prints of "ancestors and early kings of the Germans". The series includes Tuiscon (Tuisto) and Gambrivius, Charlemagne, and other kings historical and mythological. The heading for Gambrivius translates as "Gampar, King of Brabant and Flanders". Aventinus' contemporary Burkard Waldis (c. 1490–1556) wrote a descriptive verse for each of the 12 kings in the series. The verses for Gampar and Tuiscon recapitulate what Aventinus recorded in Annals of Bavaria.

=== John I, Duke of Brabant ===
John I, Duke of Brabant, as rendered by Henri Leys c. 1864–69

One of the persons theorised to be the basis for the Gambrinus character is John I (c. 1252–1294) of the Duchy of Brabant, which was a wealthy, beer-producing jurisdiction that encompassed Brussels among other cities. The brewers' guild in Brussels may have made the Duke an honorary member and hung his portrait in their meeting hall.

In his 1842 monograph on Gambrinus, the Belgian political activist and historian Victor Coremans reported that references to Brabant and Flanders in Gambrinus legends seemed to be relatively recent. However, he also reports a similarity between the likeness of John I on his tomb and the faces in some illustrations of Gambrinus. John's name, too, has a hypothetical connection to Gambrinus: In Dutch he was sometimes known as Jan Primus, and in French as Jean Primus. Jan and Jean are renderings of John in Dutch and French, respectively, and Primus is Latin for "the first". The name Gambrinus might be a corruption of one of these names. Dutch and French were principal languages in the County of Flanders and the Duchy of Brabant, and Latin was a language used by scholars and learned people.

=== John the Fearless ===
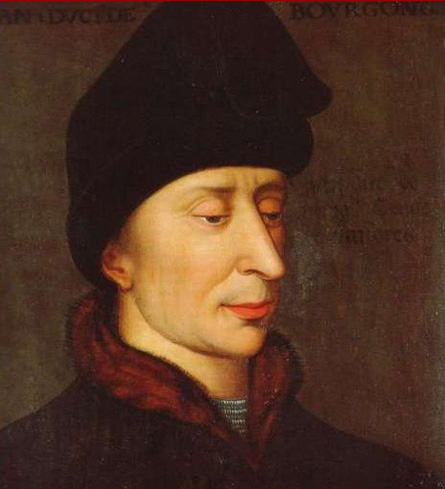
An anonymous portrait of John the Fearless (1371–1419) in the Early Netherlandish style

Another presumptive Gambrinus, John the Fearless (1371–1419), was the Duke of Burgundy born nearly 80 years after the death of John I of Brabant. The large and powerful Duchy of Burgundy also produced beer, and was found to the southwest of Brabant.

John the Fearless held several titles of nobility, one of which was Count of Flanders—a title he inherited in 1405. He is credited with introducing, or legalising, hops within the County of Flanders. Before they switched to hops, the Flemish, like many other Europeans, brewed beer with an herbal medley called gruit.

The transition from gruit to hops throughout Europe in the Middle Ages was a piecemeal, region-by-region process that lasted at least 500 years. It took time for farmers to learn of the existence of hops, how to farm them, when to cultivate them, and their value in brewing beer. Brewers had to learn the favourable and unfavourable characteristics of hops, and how to use hops to craft commercially successful beer. Even in the Middle Ages beer was an international commodity, and major brewing cities developed distinctive styles and reputations. Brewers had to consider the marketability of their beer, and competition from imports. Furthermore, regulations limited brewing ingredients in some jurisdictions. Even when a monarch permitted hop brewing, the hops might be taxed. What steps John took to institute hops in Flemish brewing is not documented, but he lived during a time when hops were being legalised in nearby jurisdictions. He was age 20 or 21 in 1392, when Duke Albert I granted the Dutch cities of Haarlem and Gouda permission to brew beer with hops.

Sometime after John inherited rule of the County of Flanders in 1405, he is said to have instituted an order of merit called the Order of the Hop (Latin: Ōrdō lupuli). According to Jean-Jacques Chifflet (1588–1660), John awarded the honour to curry the favour of his subjects in the County of Flanders. Recipients of the order drank beer in celebration.

John of Burgundy has another connection to beer, and possibly to the etymology of Gambrinus: In 1385, he was married in Cambrai, a powerful city (in modern-day north of France) whose beer was highly regarded. Allegedly, one of Cambrai's Latin names was Gambrivium—but then, the same is also said of the city of Hamburg.

The Medieval Latin noun camba means "brewery"; this word was corrupted to cambe in Old French, and may have yielded the vernacular French noun cam, a word used by farmhouse brewers in Northern France and the Low Countries for the yoke that supports a brew kettle over a fire.

== 19th-century stories about Gambrinus ==
=== Short stories by Charles Deulin ===
King Cambrinus on the cover of Aubéron's 2011 edition of Contes de Cambrinus, roi de la bière

For his 1868 anthology Contes d'un buveur de bière (English: Tales of a Beer Drinker), French author Charles Deulin wrote a playful short story called "Cambrinus, Roi de la Bière" ("Cambrinus, King of Beer"), in which "Cambrinus" makes a deal with the Devil. Deulin was also a journalist, and drama critic who adapted elements of European folklore into his work. The success of "Cambrinus, Roi de la Bière" led to the 1874 publication of Contes du roi Cambrinus ("Tales of King Cambrinus"), a collection of short stories devoted to the character.

==== "Cambrinus, Roi de la Bière" ====
In this, the seminal Cambrinus short story, Cambrinus is an apprentice glassblower in the Flemish village of Fresnes-sur-Escaut, but he believes that he lacks the skill and upward mobility to succeed in glassblowing. He becomes smitten with the master glassblower's daughter, Flandrine. After she rebuffs him, he apprentices himself instead to a viol master, and learns the instrument. His first public performance goes excellently until he catches sight of Flandrine, and flubs his performance. The crowd turns on him violently, but when the case goes to trial the judge, Jocko, is against Cambrinus. When Cambrinus is released he considers suicide, but Beelzebub intervenes in exchange for the promise of his soul. Beelzebub announces, too, that he has killed the judge.

With diabolical help, Cambrinus wins a fortune in games of skill and chance, becomes an irresistible player of the carillon, and becomes the first mortal to brew beer. Cambrinus' music and beer make him very famous, and eventually the king of the Netherlands heaps titles of nobility on him: Duke of Brabant, Count of Flanders, Lord of Fresnes. But even after founding the town of Cambrai, Cambrinus prefers the villagers' honorary title for him: King of Beer. When Flandrine finally approaches him, he rejects her.

After 30 years, Beelzebub sends Jocko the judge for Cambrinus' soul, but Cambrinus thwarts Jocko by getting him drunk on beer, and thrives for nearly a hundred years more. When Cambrinus finally dies, Beelzebub himself comes for his soul, only to find that Cambrinus' body has become a beer barrel.

=== Gambrinus, King of Lager Beer ===
Some years after Deulin published Contes d’un buveur de bière, American playwright and blackface minstrel Frank Dumont wrote a loose variation on the story "Cambrinus, Roi de la Bière". In this musical burlesque, titled Gambrinus, King of Lager Beer, Gambrinus is a poor woodcutter to whom Belzebub [sic] gives a recipe for an excellent lager beer. In Dumont's version, Gambrinus is joyfully reunited with his love, only to be taken from her by Belzebub.

The play was first produced in the US town of Jackson, Michigan on 21 July 1875, by a blackface troupe called Duprez and Benedict's Minstrels.

=== May Day legend ===
In a very brief magazine piece, Deulin told a legend (possibly his own invention) in which Gambrinus and a host of ancient French (or, alternately, Franconian) kings gather each May Day for a midnight feast at a "Devil's table" (German: Teufelstisch) near Grafenberg, Germany.

== Brands ==
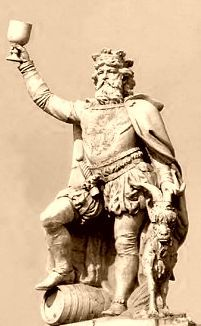
A statue depicting Gambrinus holding a chalice aloft, with his right foot atop a beer keg, and a goat to his left. Falstaff brewery in New Orleans.

Because of Gambrinus' significance, breweries, pubs, restaurants, shops, and malt houses have appropriated the character or his name for their brands.

První akciový pivovar in Plzeň, Czech Republic, has been brewing a pale lager with the name Gambrinus since 1918. In 1932 the brewery merged with Pilsner Urquell Brewery.

In Spain, the brewery Cruzcampo, now a subsidiary of Heineken International, premiered a Gambrinus-derived advertising mascot in 1902, and has kept it since. The character was designed by Leonetto Cappiello. Between 1997 and 2009, Cruzcampo opened more than 250 Gambrinus pubs throughout Spain—starting with one in the Basque Country.

Cerveza Victoria was the first beer commercially brewed in Mexico. Its brewer, Santiago Graf, started his brewery in Toluca during the 1880s. He eventually attracted some German investors, and incorporated the Brewery Company of Toluca and Mexico (Compañía Cervecera de Toluca y México) in 1890. In 1907, the company changed the Victoria logo to an illustration of King Gambrinus. Grupo Modelo bought the company in 1935, and has branded Victoria beer with at least two different Gambrinus logos. Today, Cerveza Victoria is marketed as a "Vienna-style" dark lager, and is distributed multinationally.

In Brazil, in the city of Porto Alegre, the oldest bar in the city, founded in 1889, is named in honor of the legendary king and patron of beer

King Gambrinus, Legendary Patron of Brewing (1967), a statue commissioned by the Pabst Brewing Company in the United States, has been a point of interest in the city of Milwaukee for many years. The statue now on display is the third version created since 1857. It was taken down in the late 1990s when Pabst moved to another city, but was repatriated to Milwaukee in 2011, on loan.

approximately 12 large, zinc statues of King Gambrinus were produced in the 19th century by J. W. Fiske & Company for use as architectural statues on breweries in the United States. At least five are extant, four of which now housed in museums.

Cantillon of Brussels brews a highly rated framboise lambic called Rosé de Gambrinus.

Battin of Luxembourg uses the character of Gambrinus as its logo and gives his name to its main brew.

== See also ==
- Mythological king
- Origin myth

Franco–Belgian patron saints of beer

- Amandus (c. 584–675), patron saint of brewers, wine makers, merchants, and landlords (i.e., innkeepers/bartenders)
- Arnold of Soissons (c. 1040–1087), patron saint of hop pickers and Belgian brewers
- Arnulf of Metz (c. 582–640), Frankish patron saint of brewers
- Veronus of Lembeek

Tutelary deities

- Ceres (mythology), Roman goddess of agriculture, grain crops, fertility, and motherly relationships
- Demeter, Greek goddess of the harvest, especially grains and the fertility of the earth
- Dionysus, Greek god of the grape harvest, winemaking, wine, ritual madness, and ecstasy
- Ninkasi, ancient Sumerian goddess of beer
