= Eekman =

Eekman is a surname. Notable people with the surname include:

- Kazuma Eekman, Dutch-Japanese artist
- Luce Eekman (1933–2025), French architect and actress, daughter of Nicolas
- Nicolas Eekman (1889–1973), Dutch painter
- Tim Eekman (born 1991), Dutch footballer

== See also ==
- Ekman
