= Nicolas Eekman =

Dutch painter

- Born: Nikolaas Mathijs Eekman; 9 August 1889; Brussels, Belgium
- Died: 13 November 1973 (aged 84); Paris, France
- Other name: er
- Education: Académie Royale des Beaux-Arts, Brussels
- Known for: Painting, Architecture
- Movement: Figurativism, Expressionism, Fantastic
- Website: http://www.nicolaseekman.com/

Nicolas Mathieu Eekman (9 August 1889 – 13 November 1973), known as Nico Eekman, Nic Eekman and Ekma, was a Flemish figurative painter.

He illustrated many books, notably The Destinies by Alfred de Vigny (1933), Beer‐Drinker's Tales by Charles Deulin (1945), Tyl Ulenspiegel by Charles de Coster (1946) and Culotte the Donkey by Henri Bosco (1950). He is also notable for his drawings, watercolours and engravings.

== Biography ==
Eekman was born in Brussels in the house where Victor Hugo wrote Les Misérables.

At 18, Eekman gave his first lecture in Brussels titled The unknown Van Gogh who in 1907 was an unacknowledged artist by the general public. In 1912, he went to see the first Van Gogh exhibition in Cologne, Germany.

After graduating as an architect from the Fine Arts Academy in Brussels, he took refuge during the First World War in the presbytery of Nuenen, where Bart de Ligt was a pastor. Thirty years earlier, the Van Gogh family lived in the same presbytery, where Vincent created The Potato Eaters. Up until the end the war, Eekman exhibited his work frequently in Dutch museums and collectors purchased some of his artwork, primarily Helene Kröller-Müller.

A few months after a great retrospective at the Reflets Gallery in Brussels, he died on 13 November 1973 in Paris. He was buried at the Ivry Cemetery.

== Career as an artist ==
After settling in Paris in 1921, Eekman continued showing his art in France and abroad. He was an acquaintance of Fred Klein, Piet Mondrian, César Domela, Georges Vantongerloo and Frans Masereel. He became friends with gallerist Jeanne Bucher who in 1928 exhibited his work along with Mondrian's. Nicolas Eekman and Piet Mondrian were close friends.

During the 1930s, Eekman participated in many group exhibitions, mainly in the United States, and his solo exhibitions took place all over Europe.

In the interwar period, Eekman was part of the artistic movement that revolved around Montparnasse. There he became friends with Jean Lurçat, Louis Marcoussis, André Lhote, Marc Chagall, Picasso, Dalí, Fernand Léger and Max Ernst, among others.

In 1937, at the International Exhibition in Paris, Eekman won the gold medal for his painting La pelote bleue, which was purchased by the State for the Jeu de Paume Museum.

Eekman's work was included in the 1939 exhibition and sale Onze Kunst van Heden (Our Art of Today) at the Rijksmuseum in Amsterdam.

In the beginning of World War II, he was sought by the Nazis and settled momentarily in Saint-Jean-de-Luz, where he signed his work under the Ekma pseudonym.

In 1944, the Royal Museums of Fine Arts in Brussels organized a significant exhibition in which he participated, which the Queen Elisabeth of Belgium attended.

At the International Exhibition in Deauville in 1956 he was awarded the Nude Art Prize.

In 1961, an important fresco (2.50 x 1.40 m. – 8.2 x 4.5 ft.) of medicinal plants from around the world was commissioned to Eekman by Prof. H. Griffon and was completed for Paris Orly Airport's drugstore.

== Legacy ==
His daughter Luce Eekman founded the non-profit organization Le Sillon Nicolas Eekman in 1989 to exhibit his work and foster continuing interest in his art. Several exhibitions were held in France and in the Netherlands. A catalogue raisonné of his work is currently in preparation.

== Selective bibliography ==
- (fr) Paul Fierens, Monographie Eekman, Brussels, 1936
- (fr) Maurice Bedel, Introduction à l'Album I, Paris, 1943
- (fr) Maurice Fombeure, Introduction à l'Album II, Paris, 1950
- (fr) Jean-Louis Monod, Eekman, peintre, humaniste… et magicien, éd. Pierre Cailler, Geneva, 1969
- (fr) Nicolas Eekman, peintre graveur, co-edition Le Sillon - Somogy, 2004
