= Order of the Hop =

Medieval order of merit

- Ōrdō lupuli
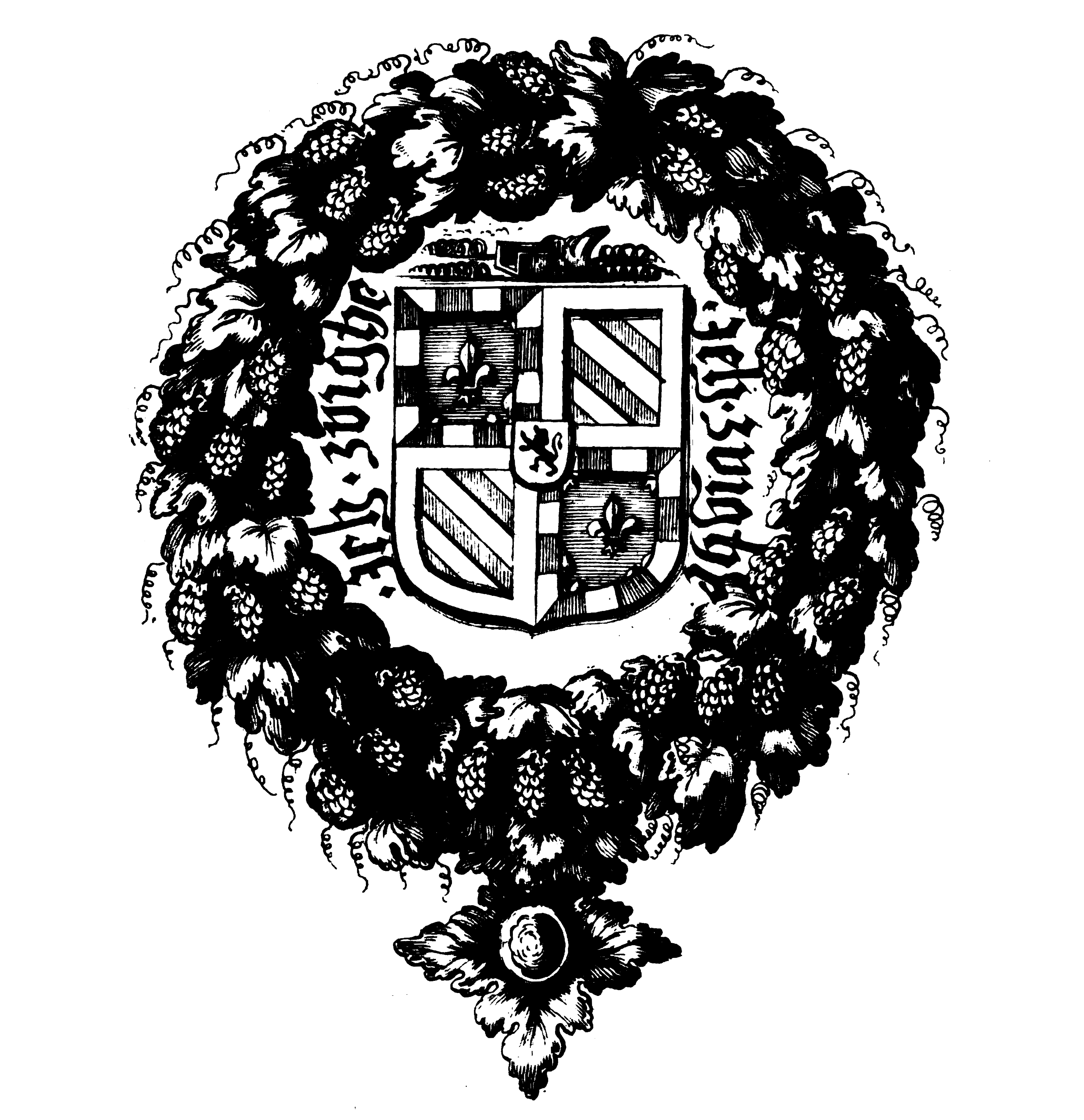
- Successor: IHGB Order of the Hop
- Formation: In or after 1405
- Founder: John the Fearless
- Location: Duchy of Burgundy

The Order of the Hop (Latin: Ōrdō lupuli) was a medieval Flandrian order of chivalry instituted c. 1406 by John the Fearless, Duke of Burgundy (1371–1419).

According to Jean-Jacques Chifflet (1588–1660), John awarded the honour to curry the favour of his subjects in the County of Flanders. He may have established the order in 1406—a year after he inherited the title of Count of Flanders.

Flanders was a major beer-producing jurisdiction. By the early 15th century, hops (the seed cones of Humulus lupulus) had gradually replaced the herbal blend gruit for brewing in the Low Countries. The order's emblem is a wreath of hop cones and leaves surrounding a simplified version of the coat of arms of the Duchy of Burgundy. The order's motto was Ich zuighe ("I keep silent").

In 1971, the International Hop Growers Bureau established a new Order of the Hop, to honour great achievers in the hop industry.

== See also ==
- Beer in Belgium
- Gambrinus
