= Titian's Mistress =

Painting by Titian and his workshop

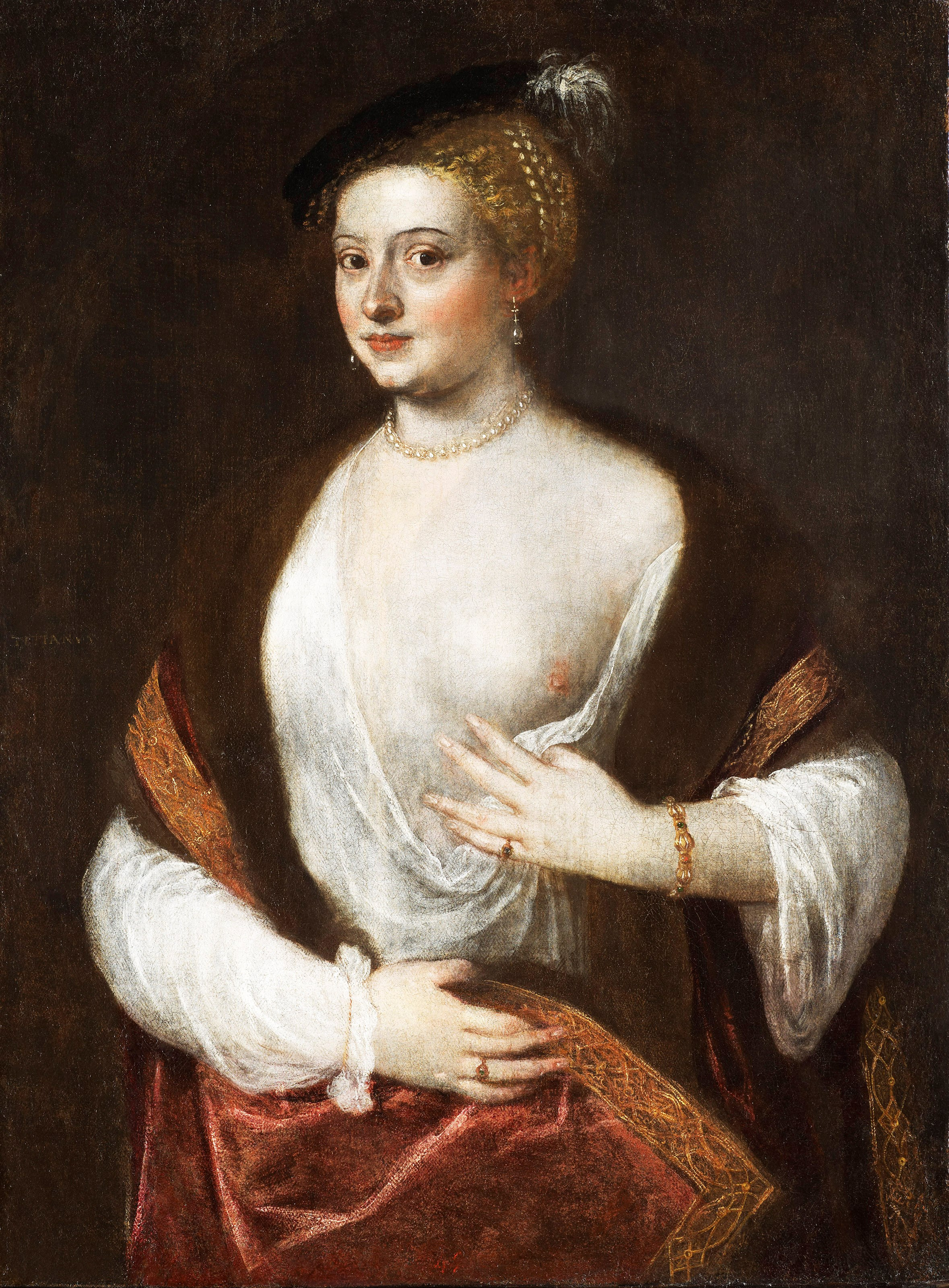
- Artist: Titian and studio
- Year: c. 1550–1560
- Medium: Oil on canvas
- Dimensions: 97.5 cm × 71 cm (38.4 in × 28 in)
- Location: Apsley House, London
- Accession: WM 1620

Titian's Mistress, also known as An Unknown Lady, is an oil painting variously attributed to Titian, his workshop, or both. It was painted in about 1550 or 1560. The painting is part of the Wellington Collection at Apsley House, in London.

== Prints ==
There is a print by Lucas Vorsterman II, dated 1640–1666, after the painting by Titian in Apsley House. A painted copy of the Titian is mentioned in Rubens' house inventory of 1640, and may be the source of the print. A print by Sir Anthony van Dyck, also entitled Titian's Mistress, is unrelated to the paintings.

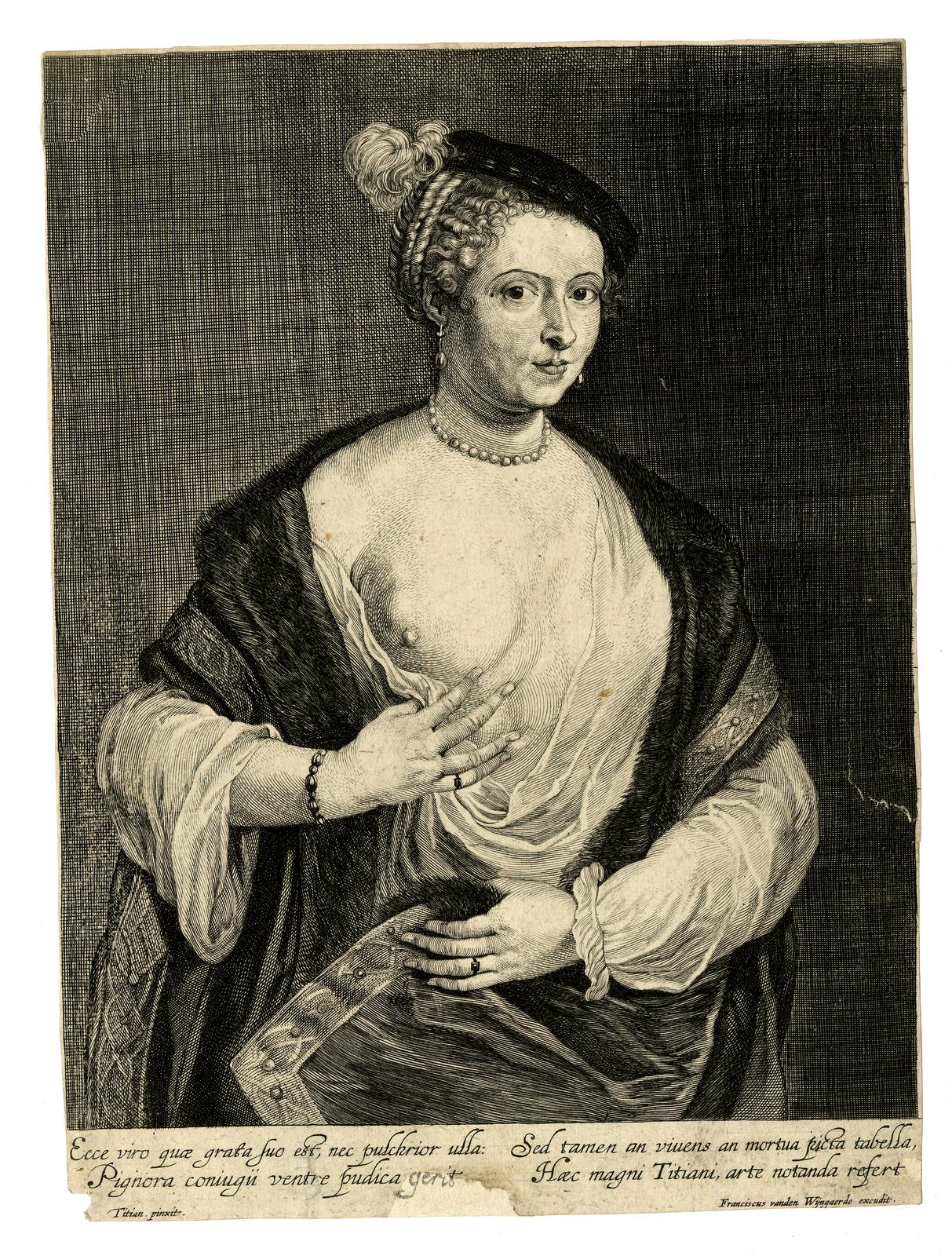
Lucas Vorsterman II: Print after the painting in Apsley House, 1640–1666

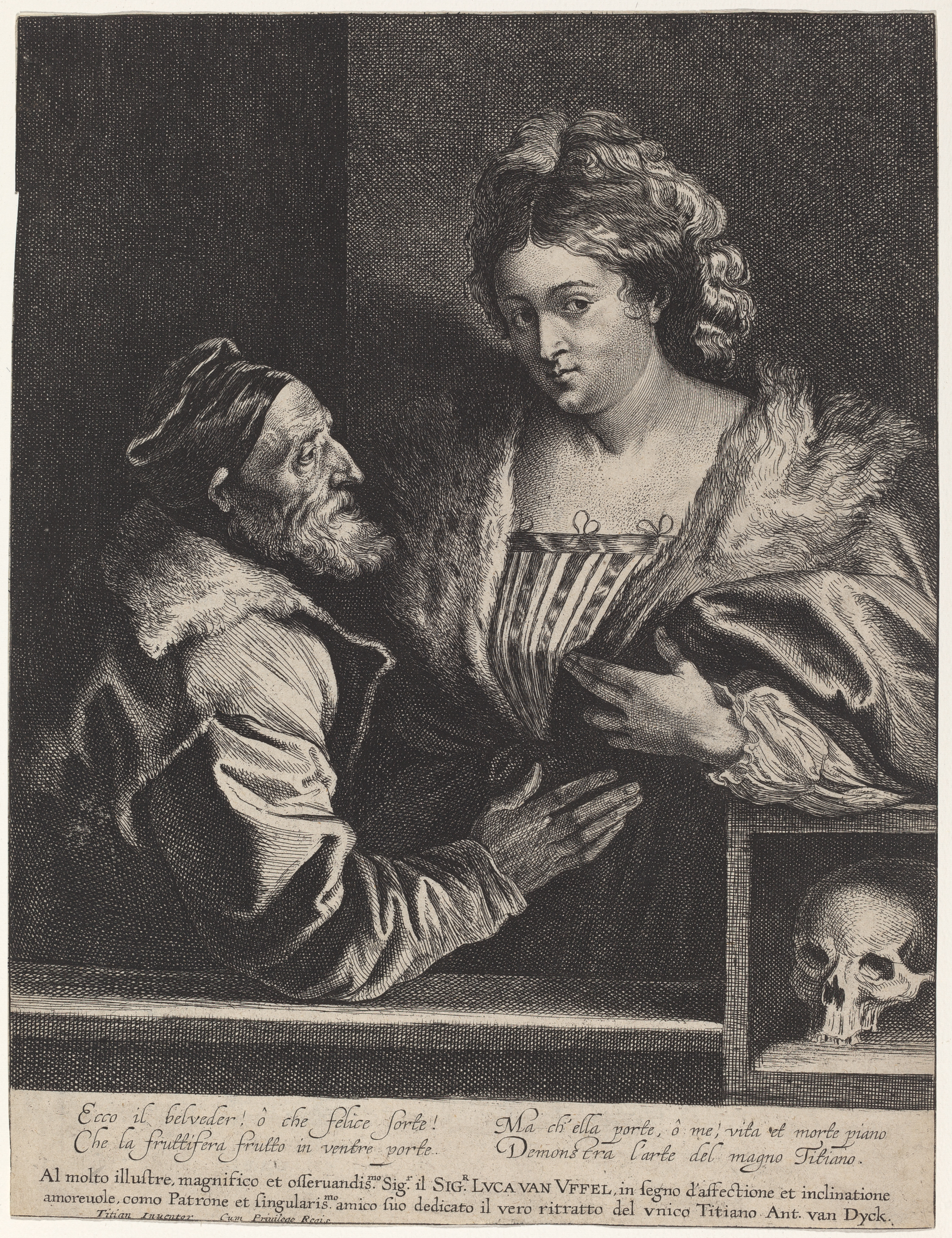
Anthony Van Dyck: Titian's Mistress

== Sources ==
- "Old Master Paintings / An Unknown Lady". The Wellington Collection. Retrieved 26 October 2022.
- "Print, X,1.20". The British Museum. Retrieved 26 October 2022.
- "Titian at Apsley House July–October 2015". English Heritage. Retrieved 26 October 2022.
