= Ignatius van der Stock =

Flemish landscape painter, draughtsman and etcher

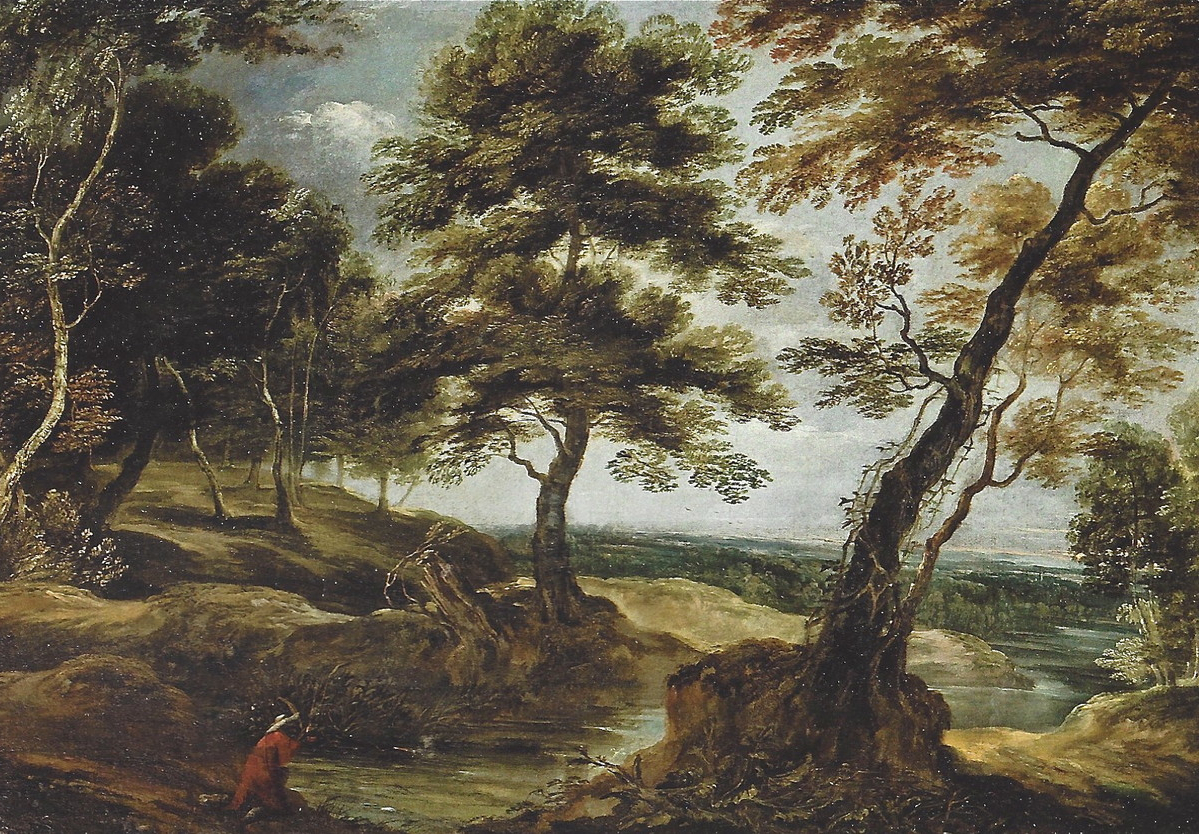
Wooded landscape with a man near a river

Ignatius van der Stock (fl 1660–1661 in Brussels) was a Flemish landscape painter, draughtsman and etcher. He is known mainly for his landscapes of views of the Sonian Forest and other sites near Brussels.

== Life ==
Very few details have been preserved about the life of Ignatius van der Stock. He is first recorded in 1653 when he became a pupil of the prominent landscape painter Lodewijk de Vadder in Brussels. De Vadder died in 1655. It is not clear with whom van der Stock continued his training between the date of the death of his master and 1660, the year he was admitted as a master in the Brussels Guild of Saint Luke.

Ignatius van der Stock is last recorded in 1665 when Adriaen Frans Boudewijns is registered as his pupil. It is believed that he died young as there are no later firm dates relating to him.

== Works ==
=== General ===
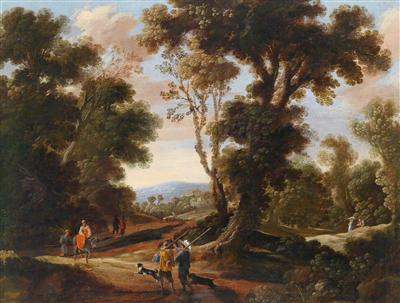
Hunting party in the Sonian Forest

Ignatius van der Stock was a landscape artist who created paintings, prints and drawings of wooded landscapes. Most of his known landscapes seem to have taken inspiration from the Sonian Forest near Brussels. He also often painted and drew the attractive village of Linkebeek close to Brussels.

Not many works are attributed to him with certainty. The largest collection of works by his hand are a set of seven landscapes with scenes from the life of Jesus in the Church of St. Michael and St. Gudula (now Brussels' cathedral). A number of his works are lost and are only known through the prints he made after them.

=== Landscape paintings ===
His landscapes use compositional schemes and strong decorative effects that are similar to those used in the work of Jacques d'Arthois, a leading Brussels landscape painter also known for his views of the Sonian Forest. He differs from d'Arthois in some aspects such as his more schematized rendering of trees and his preference for a warmer palette, characterised by reddish tones. Like his master de Vadder, Van der Stock showed a sensuous vision in his representation of nature. His compositions are sometimes confused with those of Lucas Achtschellinck, another prominent Brussels landscape painter.

=== Prints ===
Van der Stock is also known for his prints, some after his own designs others after paintings of the Flemish painter and engraver Jacques Fouquier who worked in France. His engravings were not pure copies of his own paintings but were clearly drawn from nature. This is evident in his View of Linkebeek, which is based on one of his paintings, but clearly is original in its depiction of the rural scene of two peasants walking on a shady hollow road.

=== Map of the Sonian Forest ===
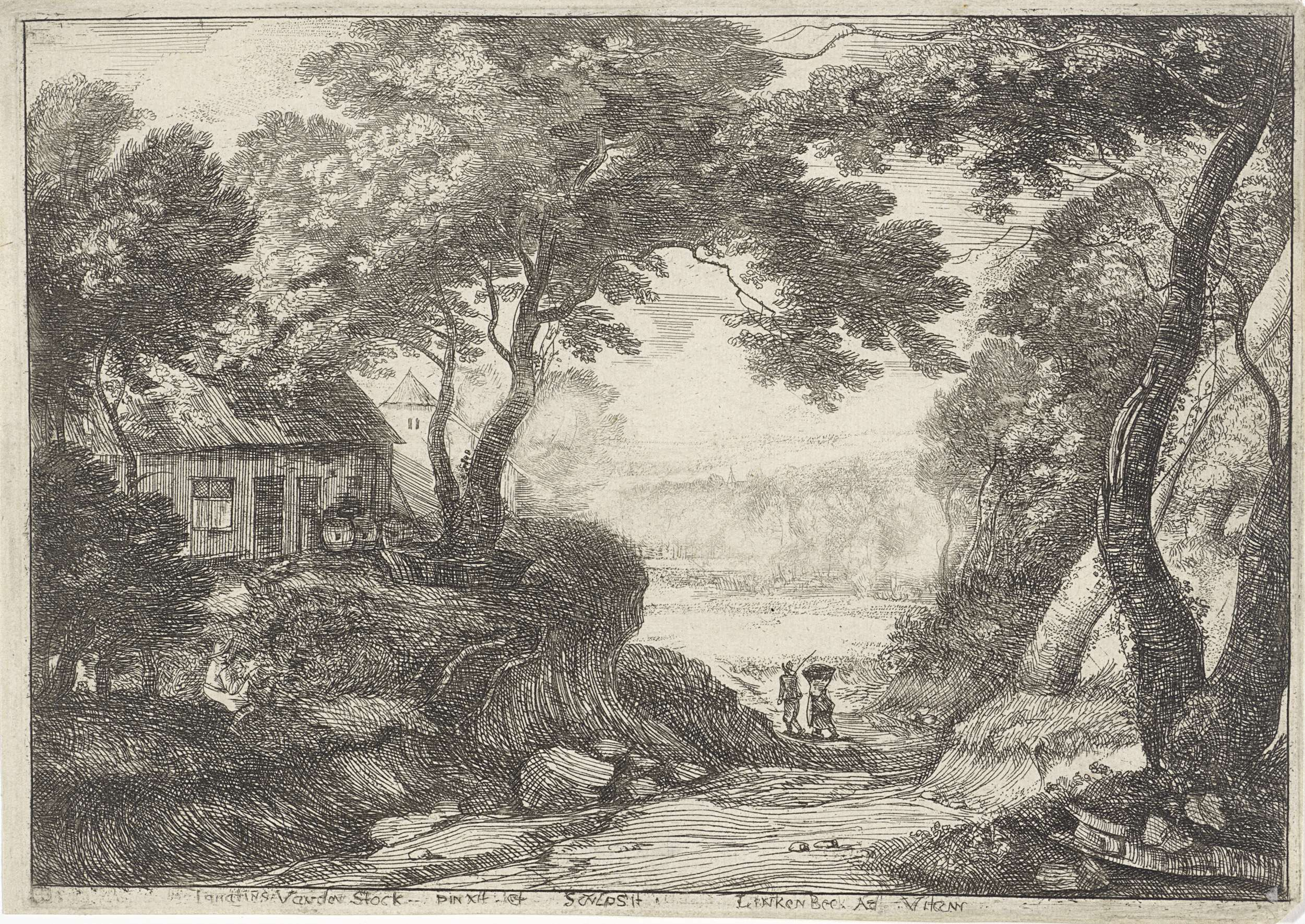
View of Linkebeek

Van der Stock painted in 1661 a large map of the Sonian Forest. The map painted in oil paint is over 8 m² in size (280 cm high and 285 cm wide) and is kept in a well-preserved state in the Belgian State Archives. The map is quite detailed and offers historical information on the landscape and urbanisation in and round the Sonian Forest located near Brussels.

The map was based on an engraving made by Lucas Vorsterman II after a map by the hand of Jacob van Werden, a map maker, draughtsman and archer of the guard of the Spanish king Philip IV of Spain. Van der Stock added in his map some further clarifications on churches and buildings.
