= Jacob van Werden =

Flemish draughtsman

- Died: Before 20 August 1669
- Spouse: Marie Granvelle
- Engineering career
- Discipline: Draughtsman, cartography, military engineering and archery
- Institutions: Spanish army

Jacob van Werden or Jacques van Weerden (fl, 1643 – before 20 August 1669), was a Flemish draughtsman, cartographer, military engineer and archer who was active in the Habsburg Netherlands. His drawings were used as designs for prints executed by various printmakers. He worked on maps, topographical views, historical scenes, portraits and book illustrations. He had a career as a military engineer and a member of the guard of the Spanish King. He advised on various military engineering projects and was an engineer of the army of the Spanish army under Archduke Leopold Wilhelm of Austria at the siege of Landrecies in 1648.

== Life ==
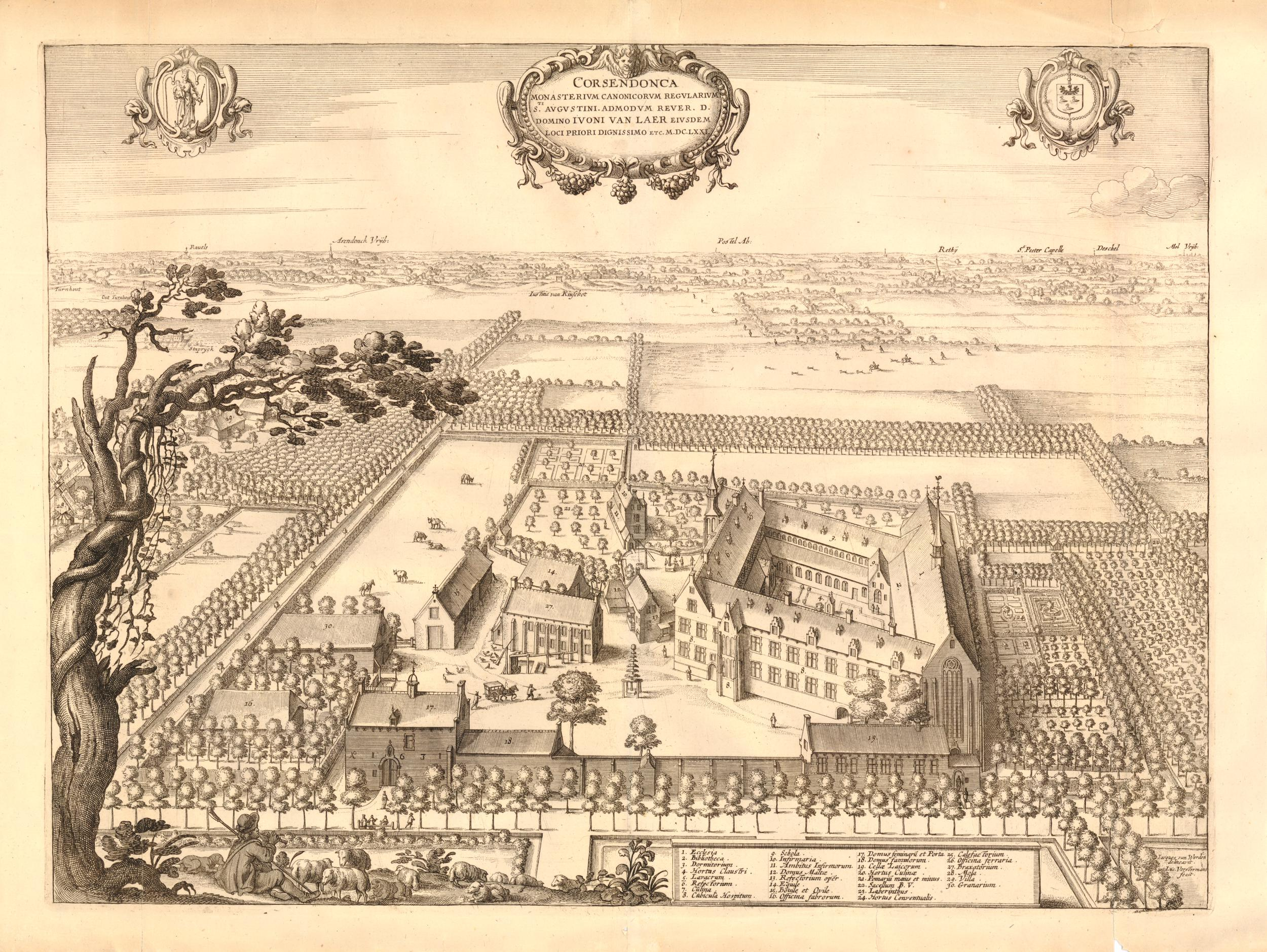
Priory Corsendonk in Turnhout, from 'Chorographia Sacra Brabantiae'

Very little is known about the life of the artist. He was active from about 1643 to 1669. He seems to have originally been based in Brussels where he married Marie Granvelle on 9 January 1635. He is known to have provided designs for the Plantin Press during the years 1648 to 1658 when the Press was run by Balthasar II Moretus. He may at the time have been living in Antwerp as the Flemish missionary François de Rougemont writes about meeting van Werden and his wife in Antwerp, likely in the house of Balthasar II Moretus. While working for the Plantin Press, he was also fulfilling commissions for the Chifflet family, a family of scientists and writers originally from the County of Burgundy who had established themselves in Antwerp. He provided designs for various prints included in their works, which were then published by the Plantin Press. Some of his original drawings are kept in the Plantin Moretus Museum, which is located at the site of the Plantin Press.

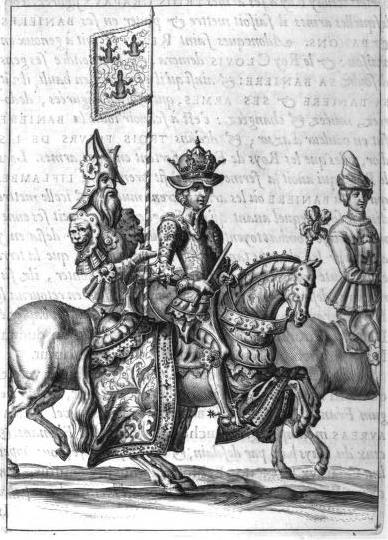
Clovis departing for war and followed by a standard with three toads from 'Lilium Francicum'

According to some sources he had a military career as an archer and member of the guard of the French King but this seems unlikely as his work and activities show a strong connection and loyalty to the Spanish rulers of the Habsburg Netherlands. Various prints made after his drawings mention that the designer was 'I. van Werden Archer et garde de corps de S. M.e'. This is most likely a reference to van Werden being an archer and guard of "his majesty" the Spanish King, a role that he may have been appointed to by the governor-general of the Habsburg Netherlands. He is also referred to as "Archer et garde du corps de Philippe IV", which makes clear that he was in the employ of the Spanish king Philip IV and not the French king.

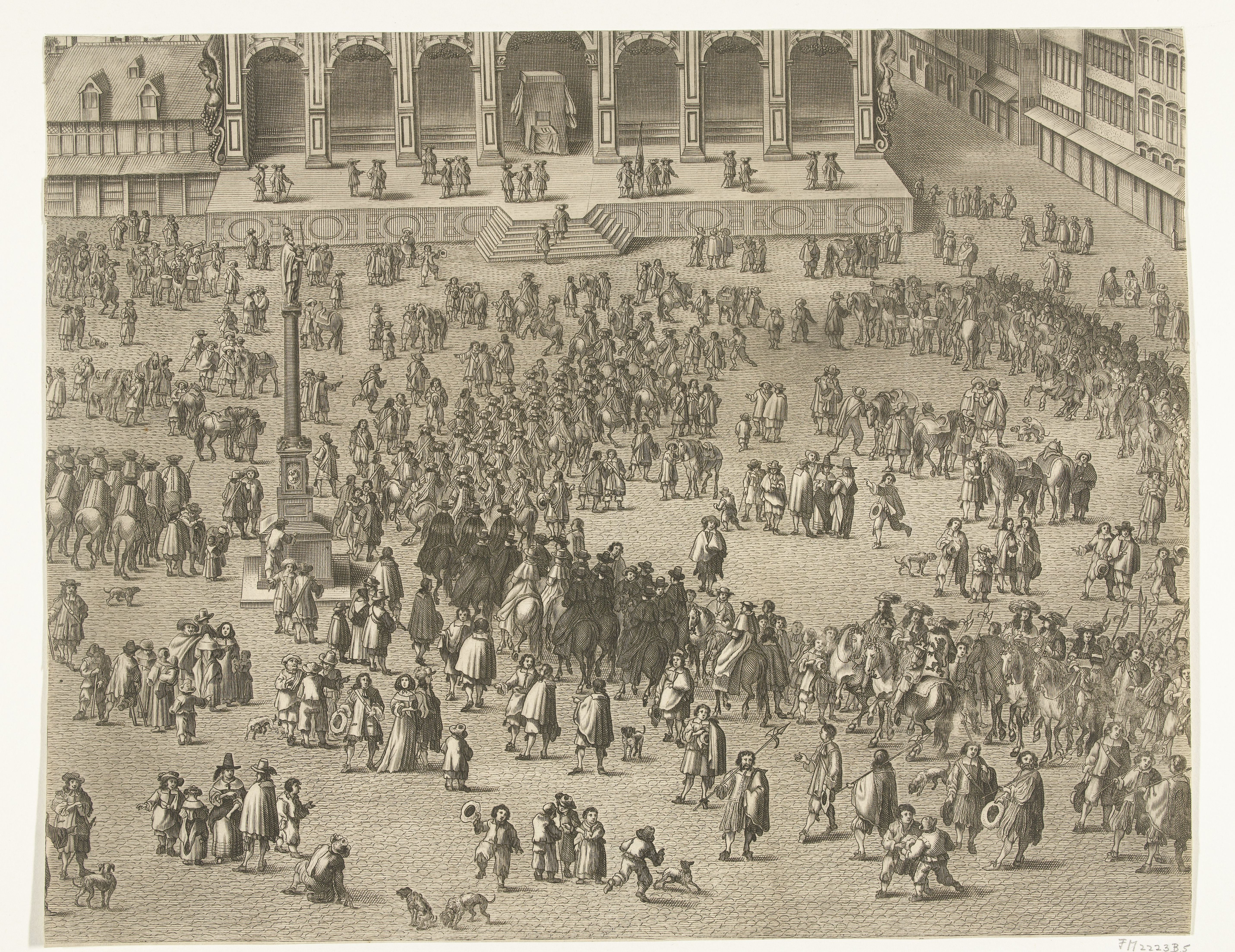
Proclamation at Ghent of Charles II of Spain as Count of Flanders in 1666

He worked on various official commissions relating to defensive works in cities throughout the Habsburg Netherlands. On 9 July 1643 he was sent by the general camp master Andrea Cantelmo to inspect the border locations. On 5 March 1644, he and the engineers Brunetty and Crespu measured the works carried out at the citadel of Namur. On 25 May 1644 he sent a letter with his opinion on the defensive flooding works for Brussels proposed by Michael van Langren. He is quoted on 28 March 1648 in a report of the Finance Council which proposes to increase his wages to 300 pounds a year as he is one of the first engineers of the country for drawing plans and maps. Until 1646, he received 15 écus per month from the artillery fund. In 1646 he became an engineer with an annual pay of 550 pounds. On 24 January 24, 1656, he is sent to Ath with Hendrik Janssens to report on and plan the necessary fortification works. In 1658 he is recorded criticizing the fortification works for Brussels proposed by van Langren. The following year he signs a map of the Sonian Forest, which was engraved and included in Antonius Sanderus' Regiae domus Belgicae, of which two handwritten copies are executed around 1750.

On 5 July 1660 he co-signed a critique of Michael van Langren's defensive works for Ostend, and approved a counterproposal by the engineers Jan Heymans-Coeck, Hendrik Janssens and Pieter Mercx. He also imitated the French engineer-geographer Sébastien Pontault de Beaulieu and illustrated sieges and battles won by the King of Spain, but of a quality inferior to the maps of his French counterpart. The engraved map of the siege of Cambrai in 1649 that was engraved by Lucas Vorsterman the Younger is an example of his work in this area. In the same vein, he would have made a view of the Castle of Ittre engraved later by Jacobus Harrewijn.

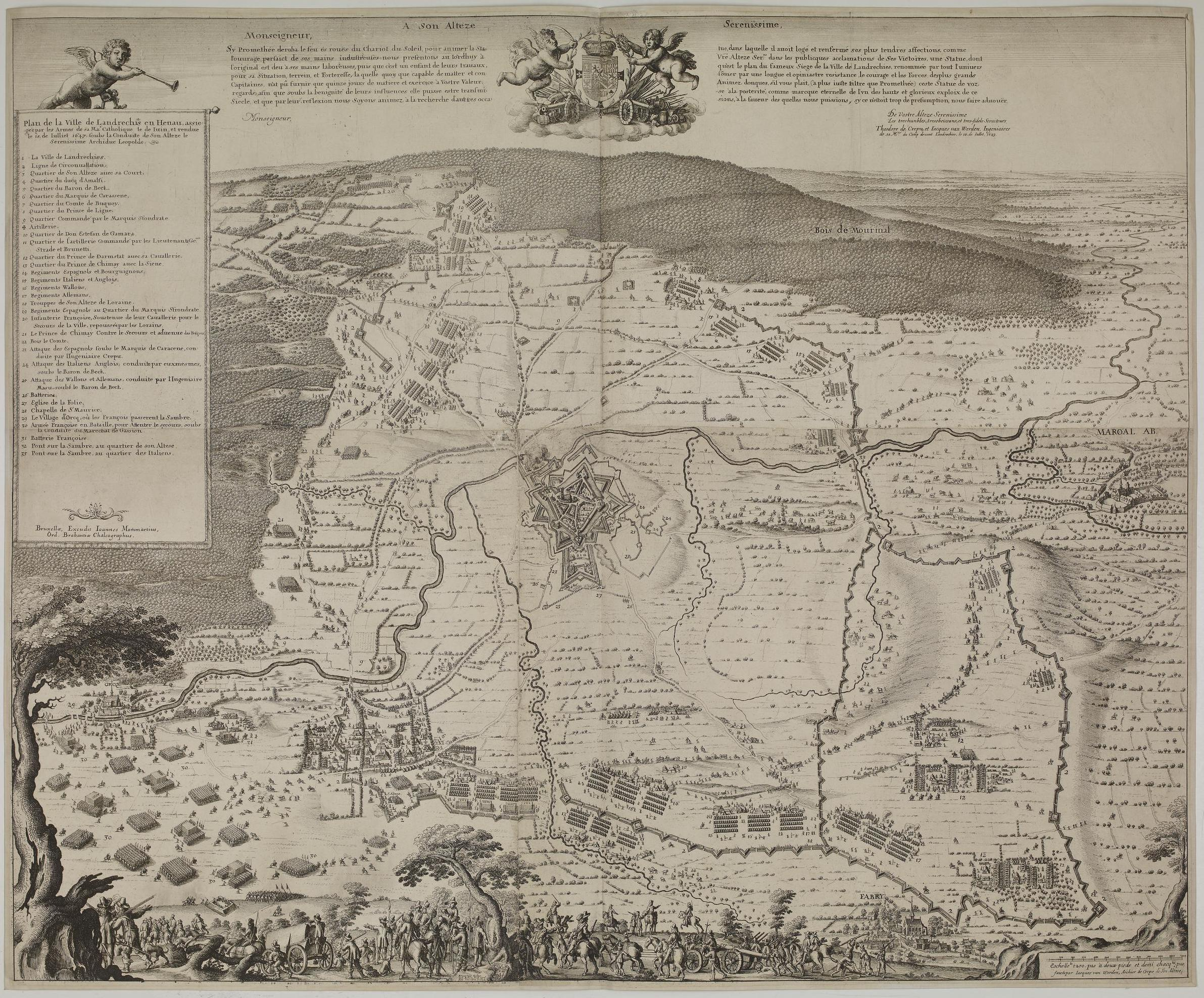
Siege of Landrecies

Van Weerden died before 20 August 1669. His son Jacob Frans had like his father a career as military engineer and map maker.

== Work ==
Van Werden is known for his drawings and the prints that were made after his designs. His works are mostly topical views, maps and also city views. He also made drawings as precursors for prints in various publications. The drawings of van Werden were engraved by various engravers including Lucas Vorsterman the Younger, Wenceslaus Hollar, Cornelis Galle the Younger, Richard Collin and Gaspar Huybrechts.

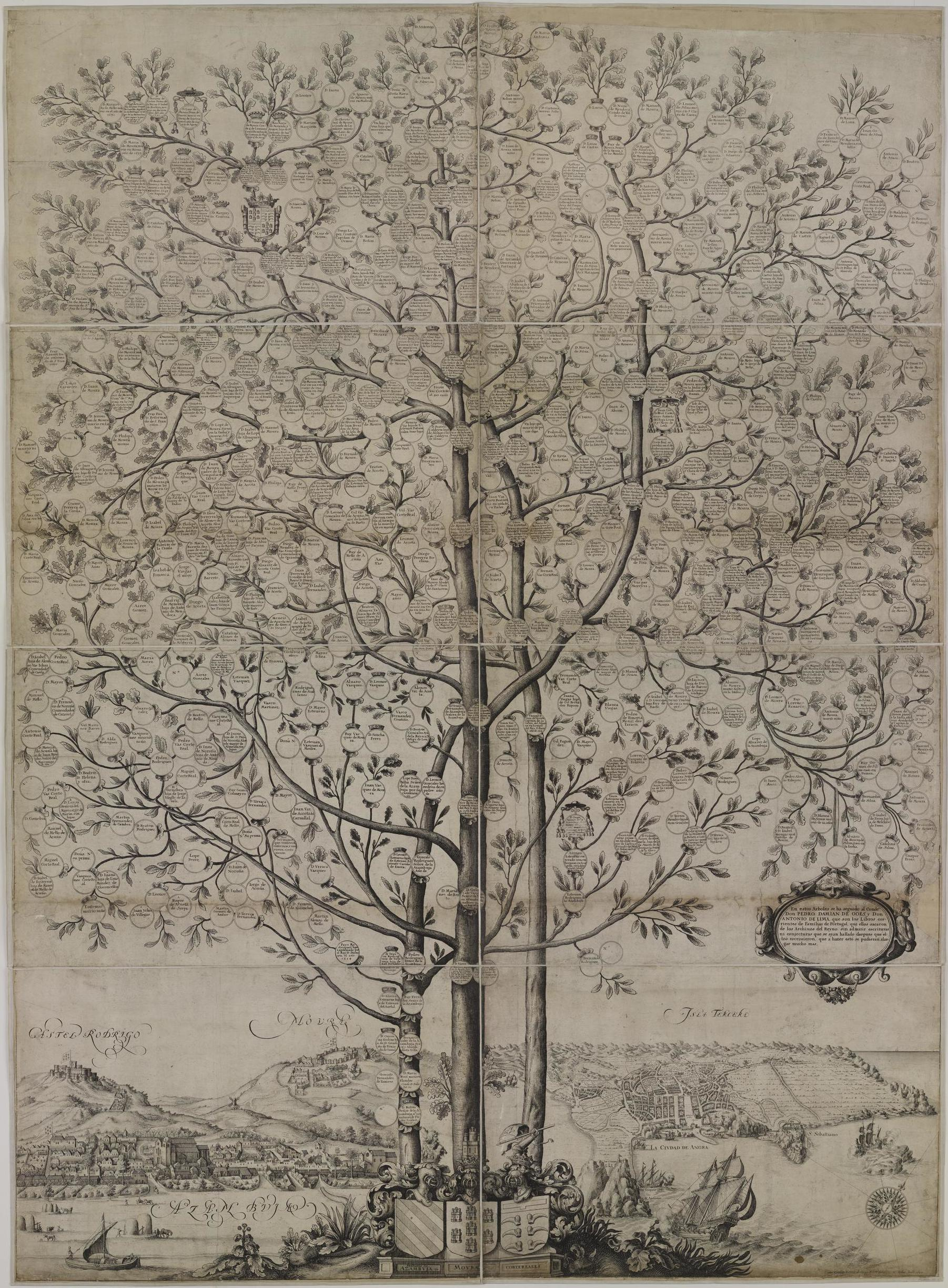
Genealogical tree of three Portuguese families, etching by Wenceslaus Hollar

He made a few maps of military engagement which were etched by Wenceslaus Hollar. An example is the Siege of Landrecies dated 1648, which is an etching on four plates on four conjoined sheets of paper. It comprises a plan of the city of Landrecies, with the Bois de Mourinal in the upper right, while it is under siege by Archduke Leopold Wilhelm of Austria in 1647. Some of the Duke's troops are shown under a tree in the foreground, with carts and guns. The print also offers a schematic view of the various regiments and forces under several commanders and their positions around the city. In the left foreground the French army can be seen approaching to attack the Archduke's forces.

He made the design for a composite print consisting of 12 prints depicting the Proclamation at Ghent of Charles II of Spain as Count of Flanders in 1666. It shows a bird's-eye view of the Vrijdagsmarkt (Friday Square) in Ghent with stage erected for the proclamation of the new sovereign the king of Spain as the count of Flanders. The king did not attend the event in person but was represented by Francisco de Moura Corte Real, 3rd Marquis of Castelo Rodrigo, the Governor of the Habsburg Netherlands. The composite print shows a large crowd in the foreground. A frame of 118 medallions showing the portraits and coats of arms of the dignitaries present at the event surrounds the scene of the Vrijdagsmarkt. Including the border, these medallions are 82 mm wide and 90 mm high, not including the shield of arms. In the frame surrounding each portrait the name of the person depicted is printed in cursive script.

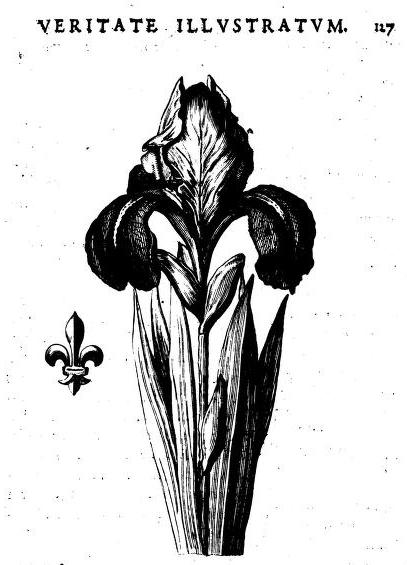
Lily from 'Lilium Francicum'

A few of his drawings engraved by Lucas Vorsterman the Younger were included in the Chorographia Sacra Brabantiae (Latin for Sacred Chorography of Brabant) a work by Antoon Sanders which gives a historical-geographical description of the duchy of Brabant, with much attention to the religious buildings such as monasteries. The Flemish painter Ignatius van der Stock painted in 1661 a large map of the Sonian Forest. The map painted in oil paint is over 8 m^{2} in size (280 cm high and 285 cm wide) and is kept in a well-preserved state in the Belgian State Archives. The map is quite detailed and offers historical information on the landscape and urbanisation in and round the Sonian Forest located near Brussels. The map was based on an engraving made by Lucas Vorsterman II after a map by the hand of Jacob van Werden, which was included in the Chorographia Sacra Brabantiae. Van der Stock added in his map some further clarifications on churches and buildings.

He was under direct contract by the Chifflet family to provide designs for some of their publications. He worked on some botanical and archeological works of Jean-Jacques Chifflet including his Anastasis Childerici I, Francorum regis, sive Thesaurus sepulchralis Tornaci Nerviorum effossus et commentario illustratus, auctore Joanne Jacobo Chifletio (ex off. Plantiniana B. Moreti (Antverpiae), 1655). This book provides a description of the burial site of Childeric I, which had been discovered in Tournai in on 27 May 1653. The illustrations were engraved by Cornelis Galle the Younger after designs by van Werden. Two of the drawings are still in the Plantin Moretus Museum. He also provided the designs for the illustrations of a book by Jean Chifflet which contains the manuscript of Jean L'Heureux under the title Ioannis Macarii canonici ariensis Abraxas seu Apistopistus; quae est antiquaria de gemmis basilidianis disquistio accedit Abraxas proteus seu multiformis gemmae basilidianae portentosa varietas (Antwerp, Ex officina Plantiniana Balthasaris Moreti, 1657). In particular, he drew the cameos that form the illustrations of this book which is an archeological treatise on antique gems. The Plantin Moretus Museum holds a total of 127 of these drawings. He also made the designs for the prints of various variations of lily and other illustrations for Jean-Jacques Chifflet's Lilium Francicum, veritate historica, botanica et heraldica illustratum (1658, Plantin Press), a book on the fleur-de-lys and its heraldic, emblematic, iconographical and historical aspects. It includes a print made after a design by van Werden which shows that Frankish king Clovis I used toads rather than the fleur-de-lys as his royal insignia.
