= Balthasar van Meurs =

Flemish painter and draughtsman

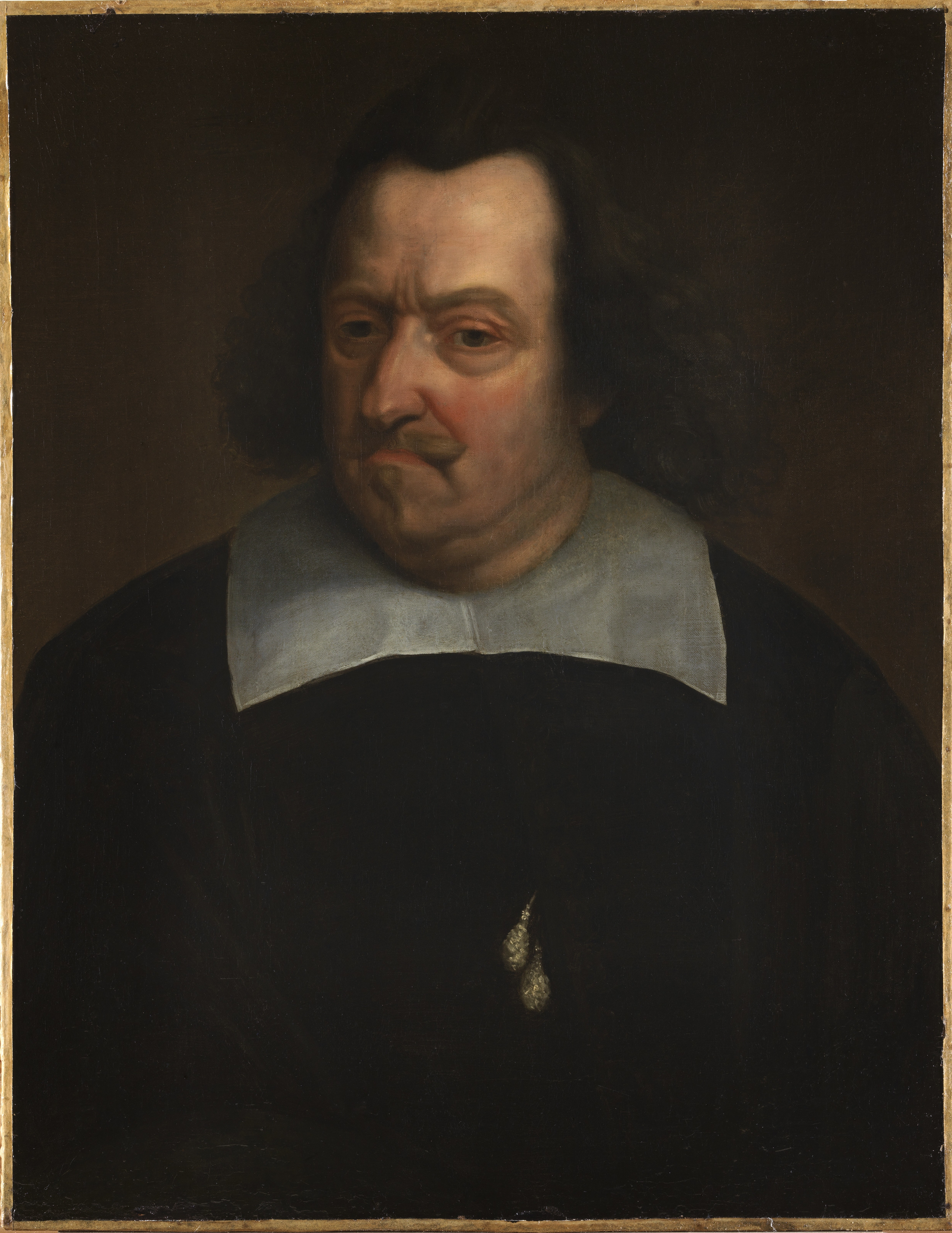
Portrait of Jean-Jacques Chifflet

Balthasar van Meurs or Balthazar van Meurs (c. 1612/19, in Antwerp – 1673/74, in Antwerp) was a Flemish painter and draughtsman. He was a member of a family of printers and publishers which was connected to the Moretus family, which operated the Plantin Press in Antwerp. He was principally a painter of portraits and his principal patrons were the Moretus family.

== Life ==
Balthasar van Meurs was born in Antwerp some time between 1612 and 1619 as the son of Jan van Meurs. His father was a publisher and served as an alderman in Antwerp. His mother Catharina or Catelijne de Sweert was a sister of Maria de Sweert, who was the wife of Balthasar I Moretus. Balthasar I Moretus was an influential printer and publisher in Antwerp who was the grandson of Christoffel Plantin and took over management of the Plantin Press in Antwerp, one of the leading publishing houses in Europe, after his own father died in 1619. Balthazar Moretus started a partnership with Jan van Meurs which lasted until 1629. Jan van Meurs also worked closely with the Nutius family of printers. Through these collaborations and family connections Jan van Meurs was part of the circle of humanists in Antwerp of which Rubens was also a member.

Balthasar became in April 1637 a member of the 'Sodaliteit van de Bejaerde Jongmans', a fraternity for bachelors established by the Jesuit order. It is not clear whether he is the son of Jan van Meurs who was registered in the guild year 1646–1647 as a master painter or wijnmeester, i.e. the son of an existing master. Balthasar's brother Jacob would later take over the book publishing business from his father. The brothers are later mentioned in a lawsuit regarding the authenticity of a copper plate painting sold as a Pieter Breughel the Elder from the estate of their father, who had acquired an extensive collection of Flemish paintings during his lifetime.

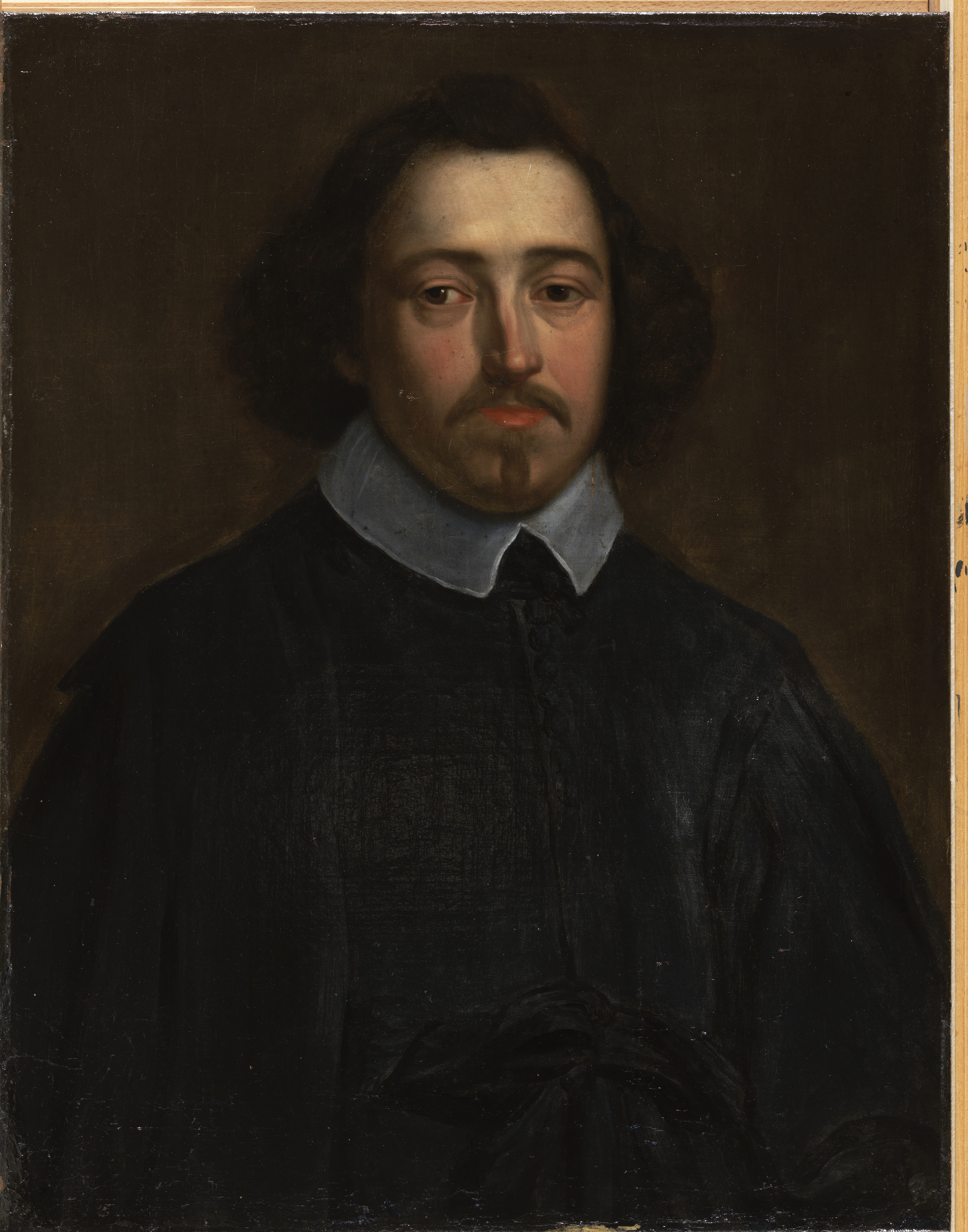
Portrait of Jules Chifflet

In the guild year running from 18 September 1673 to 18 September 1674 his death duties were paid to the Antwerp Guild of St. Luke.

== Work ==
Only very few works by van Meurs are known. The known works are all portraits and were commissioned by the Moretus family, owners of the Plantin Press and linked with the van Meurs family through marriage and business ties. The Moretus family had employed various prominent Antwerp portrait painters to make portraits of its members. These painters included Rubens, Jacob van Reesbroeck, Pieter Thijs, Erasmus Quellinus the Younger, Thomas Willeboirts Bosschaert and possibly Gonzales Coques. These paintings were displayed in the 'gallery of honour' of the family.

In 1650 Balthasar van Meurs was commissioned by his uncle Balthasar II Moretus to paint four portraits. The persons to be portrayed were Jan van den Wouwer, a humanist who was a pupil of Justus Lipsius and a good friend of Balthasar I and II Moretus, the Antwerp bishop Johannes Malderus and the scientist Jean-Jacques Chifflet and his son Jules Chifflet, both acquaintances of the Moretus family and authors of the Plantin Press. It appears that in choosing the persons to be portrayed Balthasar II considered the commercial or emotional link with the person portrayed more than their contribution to the humanism for which the Plantin Press had been famous. This reflected Antwerp's decline as an intellectual and humanistic centre at the time of Balthasar II. The portraits of van den Wouwer and Malderus, who were both deceased when the portrait commission was given, appear to be based on portraits of the same persons by van Dyck. The portraits of the Chifflets may have been made from life as both were alive and often in Antwerp where van Meurs could portray them.
