= Cornelis Galle the Younger =

Flemish printmaker

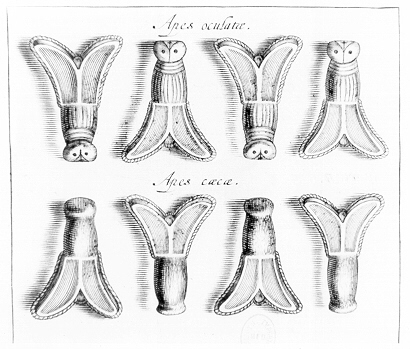
Golden ornament from the tomb of Childeric I in Tournai, drawn by Jacob van Werden and engraved by Cornelis Galle the Younger

Cornelis Galle the Younger, Cornelius Galle or Cornelis Galle (I) (bapt. 23 February 1615, Antwerp – 18 October 1678, Antwerp) was a Flemish printmaker. He worked mainly on publications for the Plantin Press in Antwerp for which he engraved devotional prints and book illustrations.

== Life ==
Cornelis was born in Antwerp as the son of Anne van der Motte and Cornelis Galle the Elder, an engraver in Antwerp who had worked in Rubens' workshop and the Plantin Press. His grandfather Philip Galle was a Dutch printmaker and publisher who had moved to work in Antwerp in the second half of the 16th century.

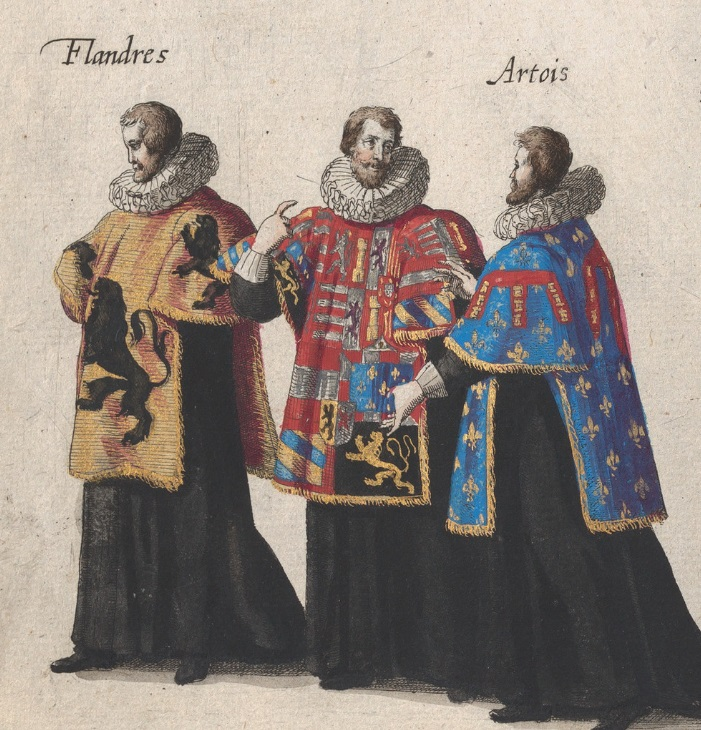
Funeral of Albert VII, Archduke of Austria

Cornelis was admitted as master in the Antwerp Guild of Saint Luke as a 'wijnmeester'(i.e. the son of a master) between 18 September 1638 and 18 September 1639. He joined the 'Sodaliteit van de Bejaerde Jongmans', a fraternity for bachelors established by the Jesuit order in October 1639.

Cornelis II married Françoise Nys, the natural daughter of Jacob Nys on 23 December 1641. Her status as a natural daughter was legitimized in Brussels in July 1657 at the request of both man and wife. The couple had four children of whom Cornelis Galle III also became an engraver.

His wife Françoise Nys died on 16 October 1678 in Antwerp. Cornelis died two days later. Both were buried in the choir of the St. George Church of Antwerp.

== Work ==
He worked mainly on publications for the Plantin Press in Antwerp for which he engraved devotional prints, book illustrations and frontispieces. He engraved the illustrations for several publications by Jean-Jacques Chifflet, a scientist and writer originally from the County of Burgundy who had established himself in Antwerp.
