= The Nettle Spinner =

Flemish and French fairy tale collected by Charles Deulin

The Nettle Spinner is a Flemish and French fairy tale collected by Charles Deulin in Contes du roi Cambrinus under the title La Fileuse d'orties. Andrew Lang included it in The Red Fairy Book.

== Synopsis ==
A great lord was so cruel to his peasants that they called him Burchard the Wolf. His wife was kind and generous, and would secretly do good for those whom her husband wronged.

One day Burchard saw a peasant woman named Renelde. He told her if she came to the castle, he would make her the countess's lady-maid. She refused because she had to look after her grandmother, and was betrothed to a huntsman named Guilbert. He returned again, offering to make her a lady-in-waiting, and then to dismiss the countess and marry her. The last offer would not have moved her even if she had wanted to be the countess, because the countess had helped her when her grandmother was ill.

Sometime later, he saw her spinning flax, and asked what she was about. She told him she was making her wedding shift, as she was to be married, if he gave his leave. He told her that she must spin nettles instead, to make her shift and his shroud, because she would not marry until he was laid in his grave. Guilbert offered to kill the count. Renelde refused because it would be murder, and besides, the countess had been kind to her. Her grandmother suggested that she try spinning the nettles.

She found she could make good thread of them, and when Burchard came by again, she showed him her shift. She began on the shroud, and Burchard felt ill that evening. He sent soldiers to throw her into the river, but she struggled to shore and went on spinning. When they tried to tie a stone to her neck, it released itself, and she made it to shore. The Count had himself carried to the cottage—he was too ill to walk—and tried to shoot her, but the bullet rebounded harmlessly. He broke the spinning wheel, but it was repaired the next day. He had her tied and set guards, but the guards fell asleep and the bonds untied themselves. He had every nettle uprooted, but they instantly sprouted again, even in her cottage. Every day the Count grew worse, and the Countess found out why. She asked Renelde to stop, and she did.

The count recovered but still refused Renelde permission to marry Guilbert. After a year, Guilbert left. Another year went by, and Burchard fell ill again, though Renelde had not started spinning again. He grew worse and worse and longed for death, but could not die. Then he realized that his shroud was not ready. He sent word to Renelde to prepare it. His pains grew less as she spun, wove, and sewed. When she took the last stitch he died.

Soon after this, Guilbert returned. He still loved Renelde and married her.
