= Nicolaas van der Horst =

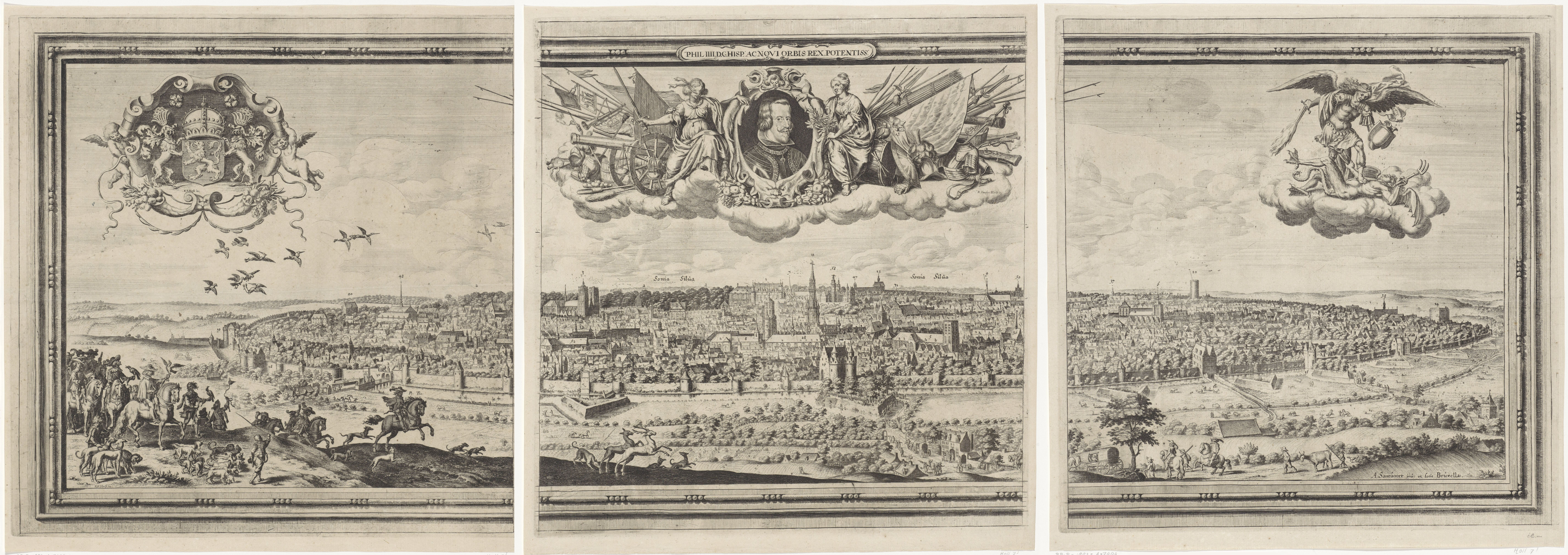
View of Brussels, engraved by Abraham Dircksz. Santvoort, after van der Horst

Nicolaas van der Horst or Nicolaus van der Horst (Antwerp, circa 1587-1598 – Brussels, 1646) was a Flemish painter, draughtsman and tapestry designer. He was courtier at the court of the governors of the Habsburg Netherlands in Brussels and given the title of Archer de la Garde. He also was a cartographer. He is now known less for his paintings than for his designs for prints published by the Antwerp printers.

== Life ==
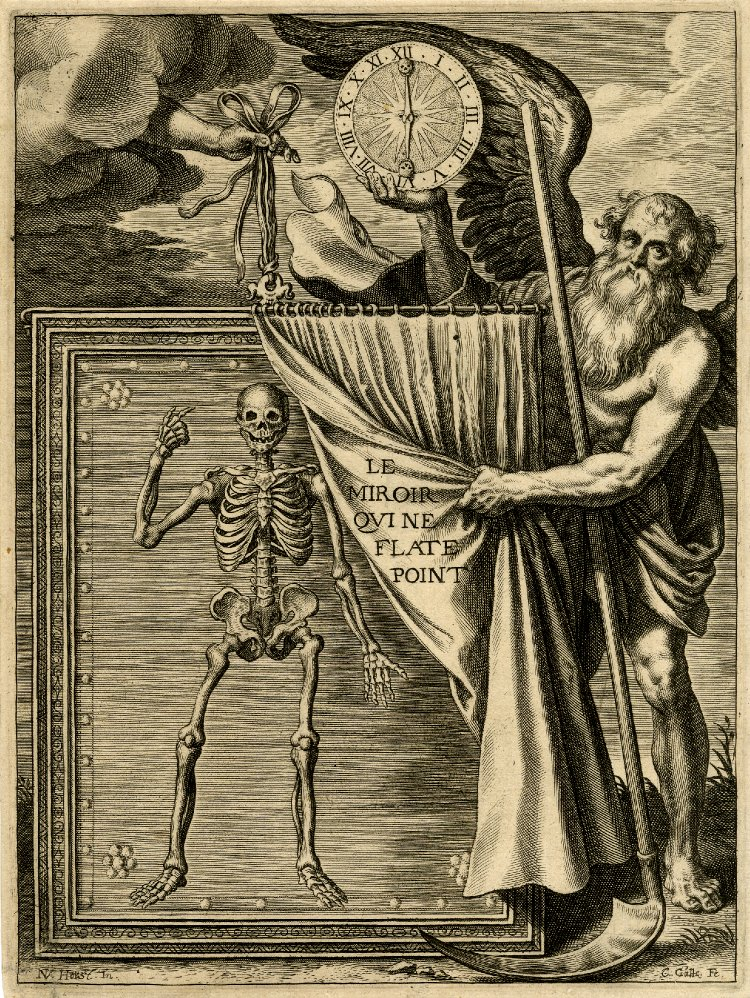
Frontispiece to Pierre Puget de la Serre's Le Miroir qui ne flate point

Little is known about van der Horst's early life. The Flemish artist biographer Cornelis de Bie wrote in his Het Gulden Cabinet published in 1662 that van der Horst (whom de Bie refers to as Nicolaes vander Horst) was trained by Rubens. Upon completing his training he travelled through various countries where, according to de Bie, his work was highly regarded.

After returning home, he settled in Brussels, then the capital of the Habsburg Netherlands. Here he worked for the governor generals of the Habsburg Netherlands Archduke Albrecht of Austria and Isabella Clara Eugenia for whom he made many drawings. He was courtier at the court and given the title of Archer de la Garde (Archer of the Guard), a quasi-military ceremonial role.

He drew many portraits and other subjects which were engraved by prominent engravers for books and prints.

He died in 1646 in Brussels.

== Work ==
While van der Horst was praised during his lifetime as a good painter in the grand style of Rubens only one signed painting by his hand is known. He is mainly known for his designs for prints and a map, which were engraved by leading printmakers of his time and printed by the Antwerp printers. His subject matter was diverse and included portraits, religious, mythological, allegorical, history and literary subjects. He worked with engravers such as Paulus Pontius, Pieter de Jode I, Lucas Vorsterman the Elder, Cornelis Galle the Elder, Abraham Dircksz van Santvoort and Guillaume Collaert.

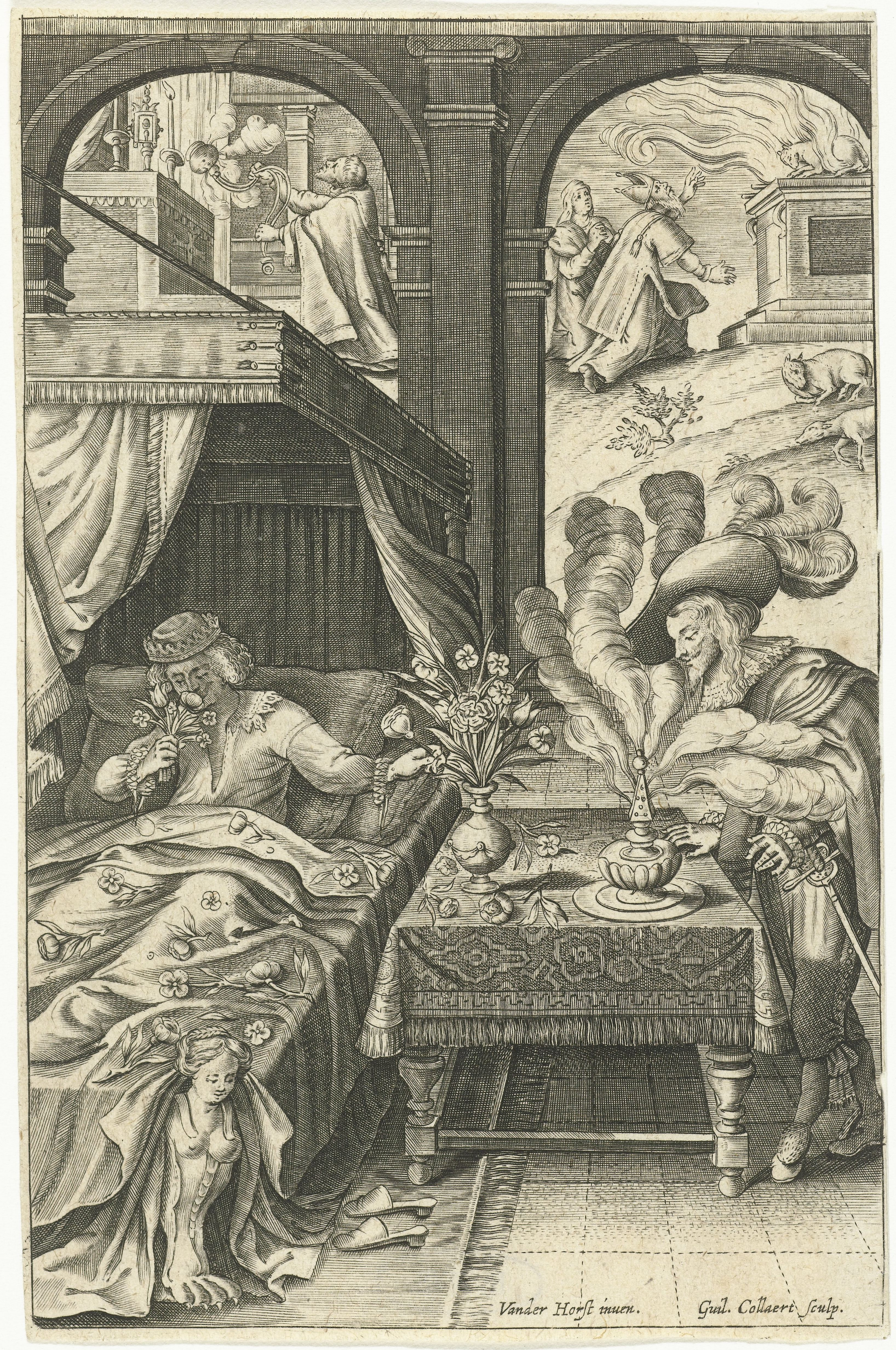
Smell

He made a series of the five senses, which was engraved by Guillaume Collaert and published in Antwerp.The print depicting Smell shows a large figure lying on a sumptuous couch with flowers scattered about. He is holding a bouquet the perfume of which he inhales, while he takes other flowers in a vase placed on a table. On the table is also a container in which spices are burning. A standing courtier keeps the odorous combustion going. Through two arcades at the back of the room can be seen some dogs, an altar of perfumes receiving offerings and the high priest offering incense to an altar.

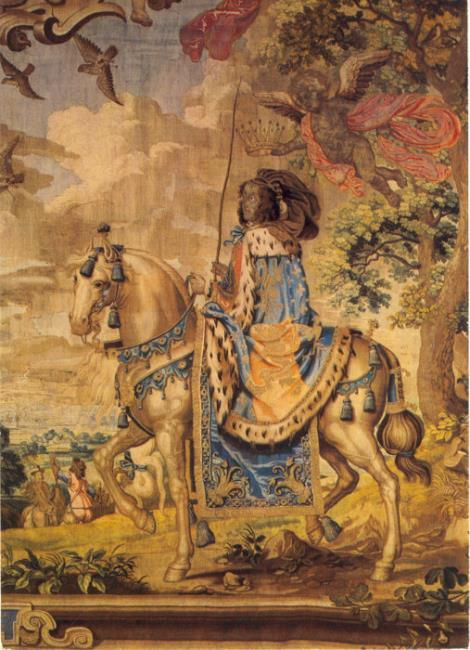
Duchess Alexandrine, wife of Duke Leonhard II, tapestry

He drew a view of Brussels which was engraved by Abraham Dircksz van Santvoort on three plates. The print shows a bird's eye view of Brussels. He also drew a map of Brussels, which formed the basis of a city plan of Brussels engraved by Abraham Dircksz van Santvoort and published by Martin de Tailly in 1640.

Van der Horst's only surviving painting is a work preserved in the Brussels City Museum. It shows Infanta Isabella Clara Eugenia of Spain at the procession of Our Lady of Laeken. This event took place in Laeken, now in Brussels, on 4 June 1622. The painting is a wide landscape in which a large procession is proceeding towards the church of Laeken. It is made up by archers, 345 Beguines, lancers and the Infanta Isabella, accompanied by her courtiers. The Infanta is wearing the religious black clothes she started wearing after her husband's death

The artist seems to have had a close relationship with the Thurn und Taxis family. He made for members of the family portraits, drawings of their funeral monuments and designs for tapestries. He designed two tapestries at the occasion of the wedding of Duke Leonhard II of Thurn und Taxis and Duchess Alexandrine of 1646. Each tapestry shows a portrait of respectively the bride and the bridegroom on horseback. The Duchess hol the reins in her left hand and the whip in her right, conform to the riding style of the courts as taught in Le Maneige Royal by de Pluvinel. This high level of dressage riding was not common for ladies in side-saddle.
