= Santiago Graf =

Santiago Graf (October 16, 1845 – August 31, 1904) was a Swiss born brewer, businessman, and director and manager of Compania Cervecera Toluca y Mexico. He was the first successful brewer of lager beer in Mexico and pioneered the "Graf" style of Vienna lager, one of the two styles of Vienna lager today and still popular in Mexico and the southwest United States.

== Life ==
Graf was born on October 16, 1845 in Oberembrach, Switzerland. In 1875 Graf purchased the original Compania Cervecera Toluca y Mexico, a small producer of cerveza sencilla, a form of light ale, from fellow Swiss Ausgustin Marendazand and began brewing a popular amber ale which is often cited as the first commercially successful beer brewed in the southwest. The problems with temperature control during wort production and fermentation in Mexico's hot climate forced him to continue brewing ale until the opening of an international railroad link with the United States enabled him to import the first large ice producing absorption machines from Germany in 1882. With better equipment and the ability to cool wort and fermenters properly, Graf was the first to successfully brew lager in Mexico. In 1890, Graf formed a stock company and erected the first large, modern lager brewery in Mexico.

Graf brewed various types of light colored ambers but seemed uninterested in pale beers like the popular Pilsener style. Disappointed with the quality of malt and hops available locally, he imported all his hops from Europe and most of his malt from the United States. In addition, he set up his own malting facilities in Mexico, using barley imported from the United States. Graf was able to increase the acidity of his mash by increasing the percentage of dark malts in his recipes thereby counteracting the high alkalinity of brewing water available in Mexico, with the alkalinity simultaneously mellowing the acidic flavors of the dark malts in the final product. The result was a popular, mellow, darker style of Vienna lager. The popularity of the Toluca y Mexico beers was such that Graf frequently had difficulty filling orders and was forced to seek outside investors to rapidly increase production.

Graf died near Xalapa on August 31, 1904, from endocarditis vegetations as a complication of an ongoing infection, and is buried in Toluca, Mexico.
