= Contes d'un buveur de bière =

1868 collection of short stories by Charles Deulin

- Author: Charles Deulin
- Original title: Contes d'un buveur de bière
- Language: French
- Genres: Folklore, short stories
- Published: 1868 (A. Lacroix)
- Publication place: France
- Media type: Print
- Pages: 321
- OCLC: 15145437
- Followed by: Contes du roi Cambrinus

Contes d'un buveur de bière ("Tales of a Beer Drinker") is an 1868 collection of short stories by Charles Deulin, a French author, journalist, and drama critic who adapted elements of European folklore into his work.

Deulin based one of the stories, "Cambrinus, Roi de la Bière" ("Cambrinus, King of Beer"), on folktales about the origin of a beer-brewing mythological king called Gambrinus. In the story, a lovelorn Gambrinus makes a deal with the Devil, and Beelzebub teaches him about brewing.

A few years later, Deulin made his Cambrinus character the focus of his next anthology of short stories, Contes du roi Cambrinus ("Tales of King Cambrinus"), which was published in 1874.

== "Cambrinus, Roi de la Bière" ==
In this, the seminal Cambrinus short story, Cambrinus is an apprentice glassblower in the Flemish village of Fresnes-sur-Escaut, but he believes that he lacks the skill and upward mobility to succeed in glassblowing. He becomes smitten with the master glassblower's daughter, Flandrine. When he tells her, she rebuffs him and he leaves in disgrace. He apprentices himself into a viol master and becomes a great player. One day, he summons the courage to climb on a barrel and play publicly. He plays well, but just as he has whipped the crowd into a dance, the sight of Flandrine flusters him, and he bungles his playing. The villagers, believing Cambrinus tripped them up on purpose, pull him off the barrel to jeer and strike him. A contemptuous judge called Jocko sentences Cambrinus to a month in prison. When Cambrinus emerges a month later, he feels so ashamed that he prepares to hang himself. As he stands with the noose around his neck, a colourfully-dressed stranger appears. Cambrinus recognizes him by his horns: it is Beelzebub. As they chat, Beelzebub reveals that he has killed the judge, and now expects to collect Cambrinus' soul, for, he says, such is his fate if he hangs himself. Not wanting to go to hell or to return to life as he knew it, Cambrinus tries to bargain. Beelzebub cannot make Flandrine love him, so Cambrinus settles for forgetting his affection for her; he also wants revenge on the villagers. Beelzebub tells him that the way to forget is if "one nail drives out another".

Cambrinus wins a fortune in games of skill and chance. The consistent winning becomes tedious, so he returns to Flanders—but Flandrine still refuses him. Once again, he is about to hang himself when Beelzebub reappears, and tells him that drinking is the way to forget. Cambrinus drinks wine, gin, whisky, cider, and brandy, but his condition only worsens. Cambrinus is momentarily contented when Beelzebub introduces him to beer, but he seeks revenge on those who would not dance for him. Beelzebub tells him that playing the carillon will prove irresistible.

Cambrinus builds a large brewery with a carillon and a belfry, then invites the villagers for a drink after Mass. They come, but find the beer too bitter. To punish them, Cambrinus plays his carillon, and everyone in earshot is compelled to dance until they beg for a drink. This time, they find the beer delicious, and Cambrinus' dances become an institution that transforms the village of Fresnes-sur-Escaut.

Fame of the drink and of Cambrinus' carillon reaches the king of the Netherlands, who in return heaps titles of nobility on Cambrinus: Duke of Brabant, Count of Flanders, Lord of Fresnes. But even after founding the town of Cambrai, Cambrinus prefers the villagers' honorary title for him: King of Beer. When Flandrine finally approaches him, he rejects her.

At the end of the 30 years, Beelzebub sends Jocko, the judge, to fetch Cambrinus; but Jocko drinks too much beer and sleeps for three days. Since he is too ashamed to return to hell, he hides in a purse. Cambrinus thrives for nearly a hundred years more. When Cambrinus finally dies, Beelzebub comes for his soul, only to find that Cambrinus' body has become a beer barrel.

=== A derivation for the stage ===
Some years after Deulin published Contes d'un buveur de bière, American playwright and blackface minstrel Frank Dumont wrote a loose variation on the story "Cambrinus, Roi de la Bière". In this musical burlesque, titled Gambrinus, King of Lager Beer, Gambrinus is a poor woodcutter to whom "Belzebub" [sic] gives a recipe for an excellent lager beer. In Dumont's version, Gambrinus is joyfully reunited with his love, only to be taken from her by Belzebub.

The play was first produced in the US town of Jackson, Michigan on 21 July 1875, by a blackface troupe called Duprez and Benedict's Minstrels.

== See also ==
- 1868 in literature
- 19th-century French literature
