= Luce Eekman =

French architect (1933–2025)

- Born: 28 June 1933; Paris, France
- Died: 2 February 2025 (aged 91); Paris, France
- Education: École Spéciale d'Architecture; Beaux-Arts de Paris
- Occupation: Architect

Luce Eekman (28 June 1933 – 2 February 2025) was a French architect and actress.

== Life and career ==
=== Architectural career ===
Eekman attended the École alsacienne before earning a diploma from the École Spéciale d'Architecture. While there, she received praise for her work surveying Thoronet Abbey. She received notoriety for her work restoring La Pagode, a former cinema in Paris. In 1972, she was tasked by Louis Malle to construct a teahouse in a Japanese garden. In doing so, she constructed a cinema room that contained 175 seats. A plaque at the teahouse was affixed to the entrance of the cinema room honoring her and her co-architect François Debulois. In April 2011, Paris 1 Panthéon-Sorbonne University student Aïda Menouer wrote a thesis on Eekman's work, titled La Pagode, de la salle de réception au cinéma d'art et d'essai.

Eekman's principal works included Le Diable des Lombards in The Marais, the apartments of Louis Malle and his brother Vincent, the Photogalerie, and an apartment building on Rue Delambre in the 14th arrondissement of Paris.

=== Acting ===
While at the École alsacienne, Eekman befriended future film director Yannick Bellon and appeared in his film Quelque part quelqu'un. She was close to the theatre troupe Les Théophiliens, as well as Roger Planchon's Théâtre National Populaire. In 1975, she performed in the play Enluminures autour des minutes du procès de Gilles de Rais at the Théâtre Essaïon.

=== Personal life and death ===
Eekman was the daughter of Flemish painter Nicolas Eekman and Andrée Herrenschmidt. In her father's honor, she founded Le Sillon Nicolas Eekman. The association published monographies on the painter and organized exhibits. One such exhibition was held by the Fondation Taylor.

Luce Eekman died in Paris on 2 February 2025, at the age of 91.
