= Charles Deulin =

French folklorist (1827–1877)

- Born: 4 January 1827; Condé-sur-l'Escaut
- Died: 30 September 1877; Condé-sur-l'Escaut
- Occupation: Writer
- Writing career
- Language: French
- Genres: Folklore, short story, comedy
- Subject: History of literature (fairy tales)

Charles Deulin (1827–1877) was a French writer, theatre critic, and folklorist who is most known for his contemporary adaptations of European folk tales. Among his many stories are "Cambrinus, King of Beer", "The Twelve Dancing Princesses", "The Enchanted Canary", and "The Nettle Spinner'.

Deulin was born into a poor family in Condé-sur-l'Escaut. a former department of France a commune on the Belgian border of northern France. His father was a tailor, but Deulin found work as secretary to a notary—who also happened to be a patron of the arts. After Deulin eloped with a local girl and moved to Paris, he made a living writing columns and theatre reviews for various periodicals; but his most successful works were short stories based on the folk tales of the countryside. He reinvigorated the tales by infusing them with the character of the time and place in which he lived. The vernacular language and familiar ambiance appealed to his readers in the Low Countries.

His first effort, "Le compère de la mort", was an adaptation of an oral story he had once heard. He went on to research and write three short story collections, which were well-received and widely read: Tales of a Beer Drinker (1868), Tales of King Cambrinus (1874), and Small Town Stories: Tales and Novellas (1875). After Deulin's death in 1877, his publisher distributed the author's final contribution to folkloristics: Mother Goose Tales before Perrault (1878). (Charles Perrault (1628–1703) is the author of Tales of Mother Goose (1697) and the founder of the fairy tale genre.)

== See also ==
- 19th-century French literature
- French folklore
- Charles Perrault

== Bibliography ==
- Contes d'un buveur de bière. Paris: A. Lacroix. 1868. OCLC 15145437.
- Contes du roi Cambrinus. Paris: E. Dentu. 1874. OCLC 9045829.
- Histoires de petite ville : contes et nouvelles. Paris: E. Dentu. 1875. OCLC 36669421.
- Les contes de ma mère l'Oye avant Perrault. Paris: E. Dentu. 1878. OCLC 457790598.
