= Lucas Vorsterman II =

Flemish engraver (1624 – between 1666 and 1676)

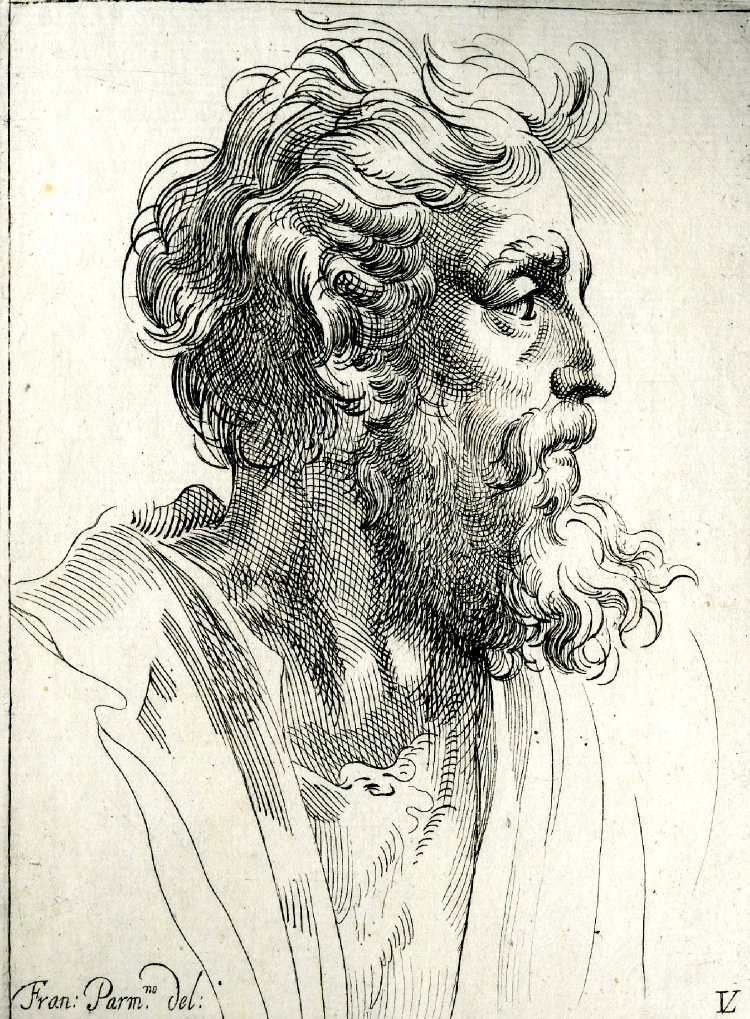
Head of a bearded man, in profile to right

Lucas Vorsterman II, Lucas Vorsterman the Younger or Lucas Vorsterman Junior (1624 – between 1666 and 1676) was a Flemish Baroque engraver and draughtsman. He produced engravings after the work of the leading painters of the next generation and for the various book projects of the Antwerp publishers.

== Life ==
Lucas Vorsterman the Younger was born in Antwerp. He was the son of Lucas Vorsterman I who worked as an engraver with leading Flemish artists Peter Paul Rubens and Anthony van Dyck. He trained under his father and became a master of the Antwerp Guild of Saint Luke in 1651/2.

He is believed to have died in Antwerp between 1666 and 1676.

== Work ==
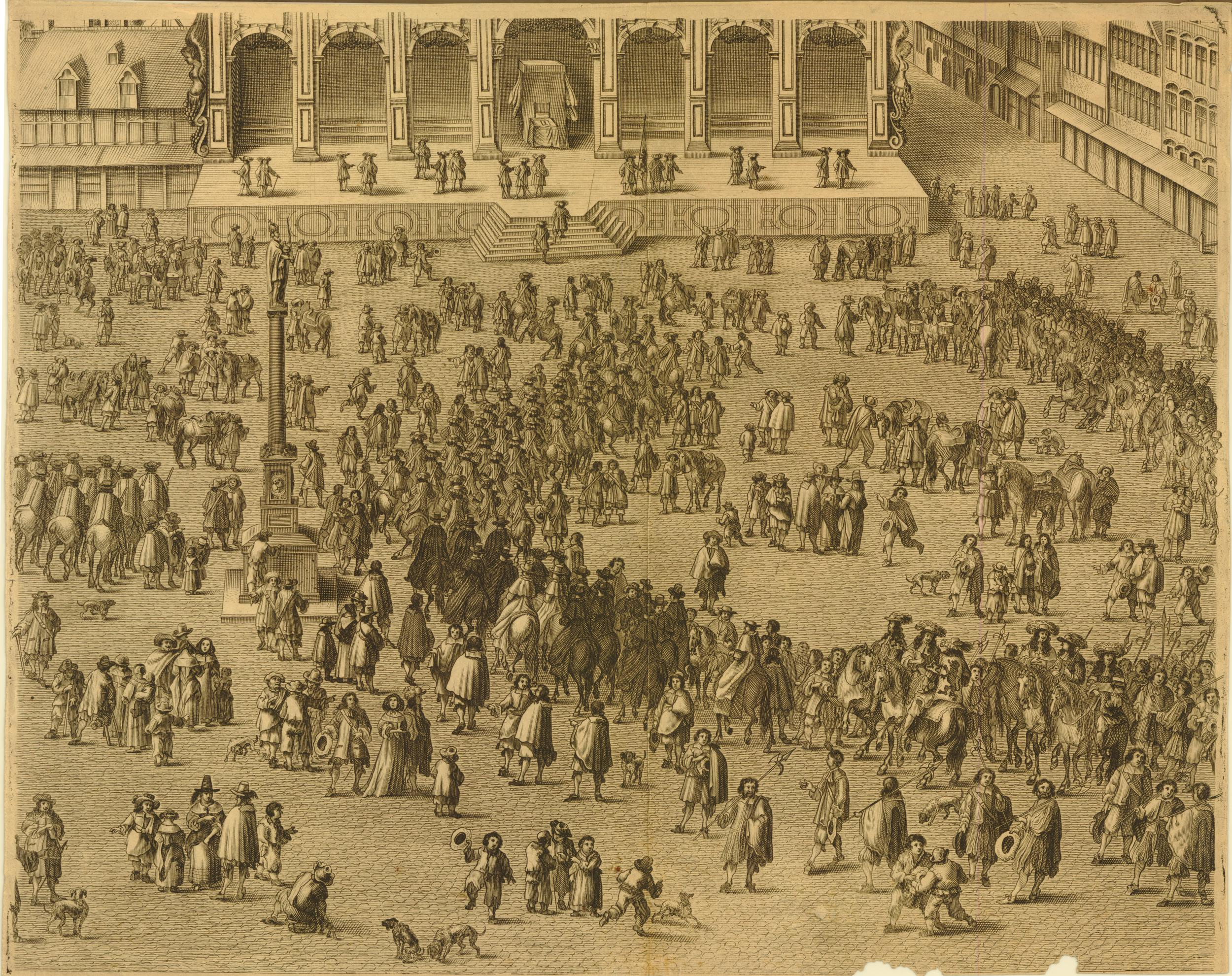
Ceremony of the proclamation of Charles II, King of Spain, as Count of Flanders

Lucas Vorsterman the Younger made many engravings after Rubens, van Dyck, Jacob Jordaens and Cornelius Schut. He worked on various publication projects of Antwerp publishers.

He worked with Gaspar Bouttats on engravings after drawings by Jan Peeters I for the publication by Jacob Peeters in Antwerp of several sets of prints issued under the title Description des principales villes, havres et isles du golfe de Venise du cote oriental, comme aussi des villes et fortresses de la Moree et quelques places de la Grece et es isles principales de l'Archipel et fortresses dícelles et en suittes quelques places renommées de la Terre Saincte, et autres dessous la domination Ottomane vers le Midij et l'Orient, et quelques principales villes en Perse et le regne du Grand Mogol le tout en Abrege. This was a series of maps and views of locations in Southern Europe, Northern Africa and the Middle East.

Lucas Vorsterman the Younger also made many reproductive engravings for David Teniers the Younger’s illustrated catalogue of the Italian pictures in the collection of Archduke Leopold Wilhelm of Austria. The publication entitled Theatrum pictorium was published in Antwerp in 1658.

The Scottish National Gallery in Edinburgh holds a drawing by his hand.

The works of Lucas Vorsterman II are regarded as lacking skilled draughtsmanship and to be mechanical in their execution.
