= Vandal War (461–468) =

Roman war against the Vandal Kingdom

- Part of Fall of the Western Roman Empire and Roman–Germanic Wars
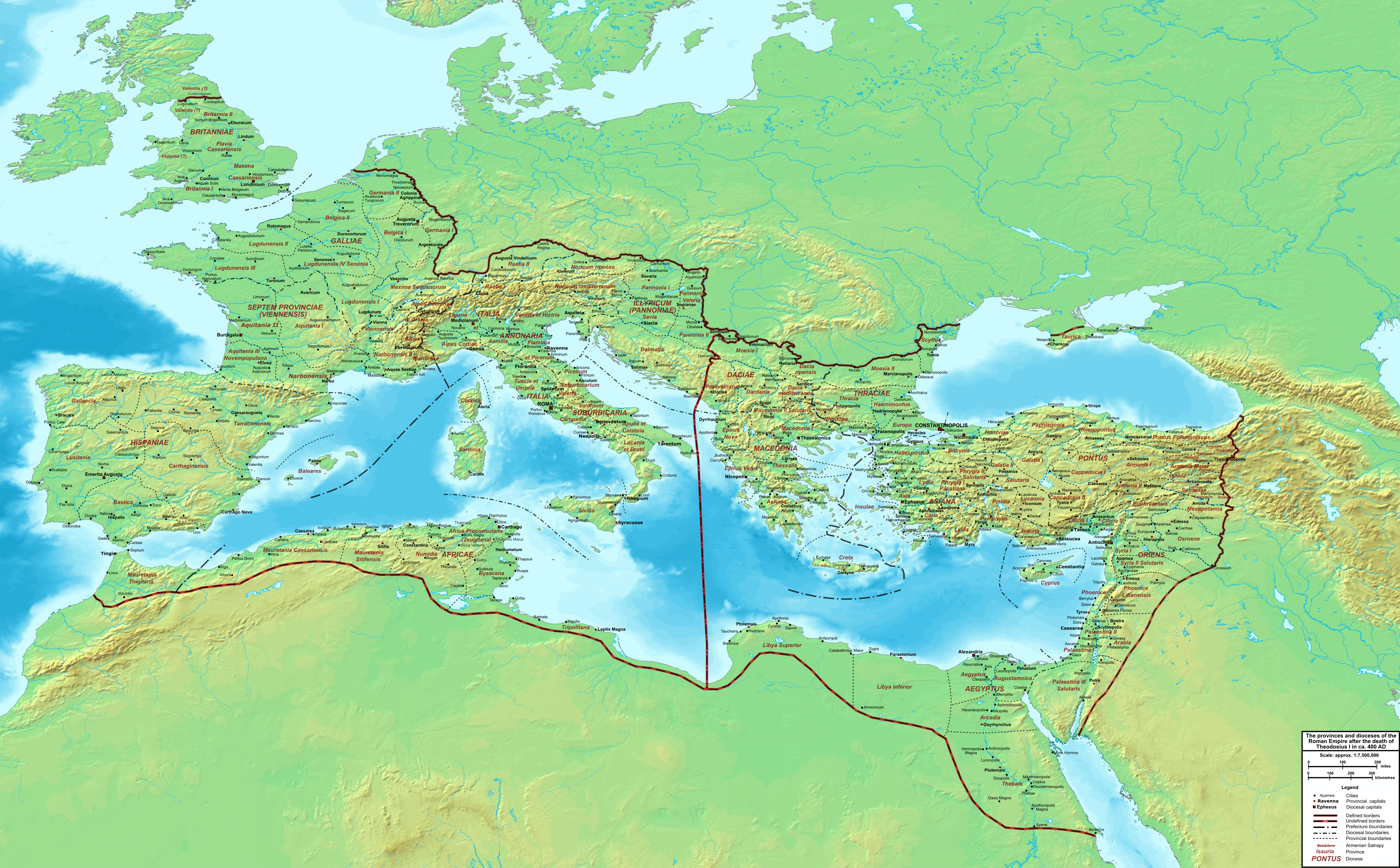
- Map of Roman Empire
Date	461–468
Location	Mediterranean
Result	Vandal victory

Belligerents
Vandal Kingdom	West Roman Empire; East Roman Empire; Foederati

Commanders and leaders
Geiseric; Huneric; Gento; Aegidius	Ricimer; Leo I Anthemius; Marcellinus; Basiliscus; Heraclius of Edessa

Strength
15,000–25,000	Procopius: 100,000 men Cedrenus: 1,113 ships Modern estimate: 50,000 men

Casualties and losses
Unknown	50,000

The Vandal War (461–468) was a long-term conflict between the two halves of the Roman Empire on the one hand and the Vandals in North Africa on the other. The war revolved around hegemony in the Mediterranean and the western empire. The Vandals as a rising power posed an enormous threat to the stability of the Roman Empire. Piracy and plunder were scourges threatening trade throughout the Mediterranean. The Roman war effort from 466 onwards was aimed at the destruction of the Vandal Kingdom to restore the empire to its original territory. Armed conflicts alternated with peace talks, and the two parts of the Roman Empire did not always act in unison.

== Main figures ==
Geiseric (429–477), king of the Vandals, had played an important role since he led his people to Africa in 429. He had received that position by emerging victorious in a series of wars with the Romans. In the conflict between 461 and 468 his main opponents were: Ricimer, commander-in-chief of the Western Roman army and strongman in the west since his coup in 461, and Leo I (457–474), emperor of the eastern part of the Roman Empire, who frequently occupied himself with the western part because of the lack of a western counterpart. The eastern emperor oversaw many ambitious political and military plans, mainly aimed at aiding the faltering Western Roman Empire and recovering its former territories. Furthermore, the Roman general Marcellinus, a fierce opponent of Ricimer, played a prominent role from the start. The role of Western Roman emperor Libius Severus (461–465) was minimal, while that of his successor Anthemius (467-472), on the other hand, was considerably greater. Basiliscus at least, an Eastern Roman general, played an important role at the end of the war.

== Prelude ==
After the earlier Vandal War of 439–442, North Africa largely fell into the hands of the Vandals. They were formally as foederati of the Romans but de facto ruled that part of the empire to their own discretion. Since then, the Vandals had control of part of the Mediterranean fleet and focused on piracy, at first on a small scale but becoming more and more significant over time. The Western Roman Empire lacked sufficient resources to effectively counter this.

=== Sack of Rome ===
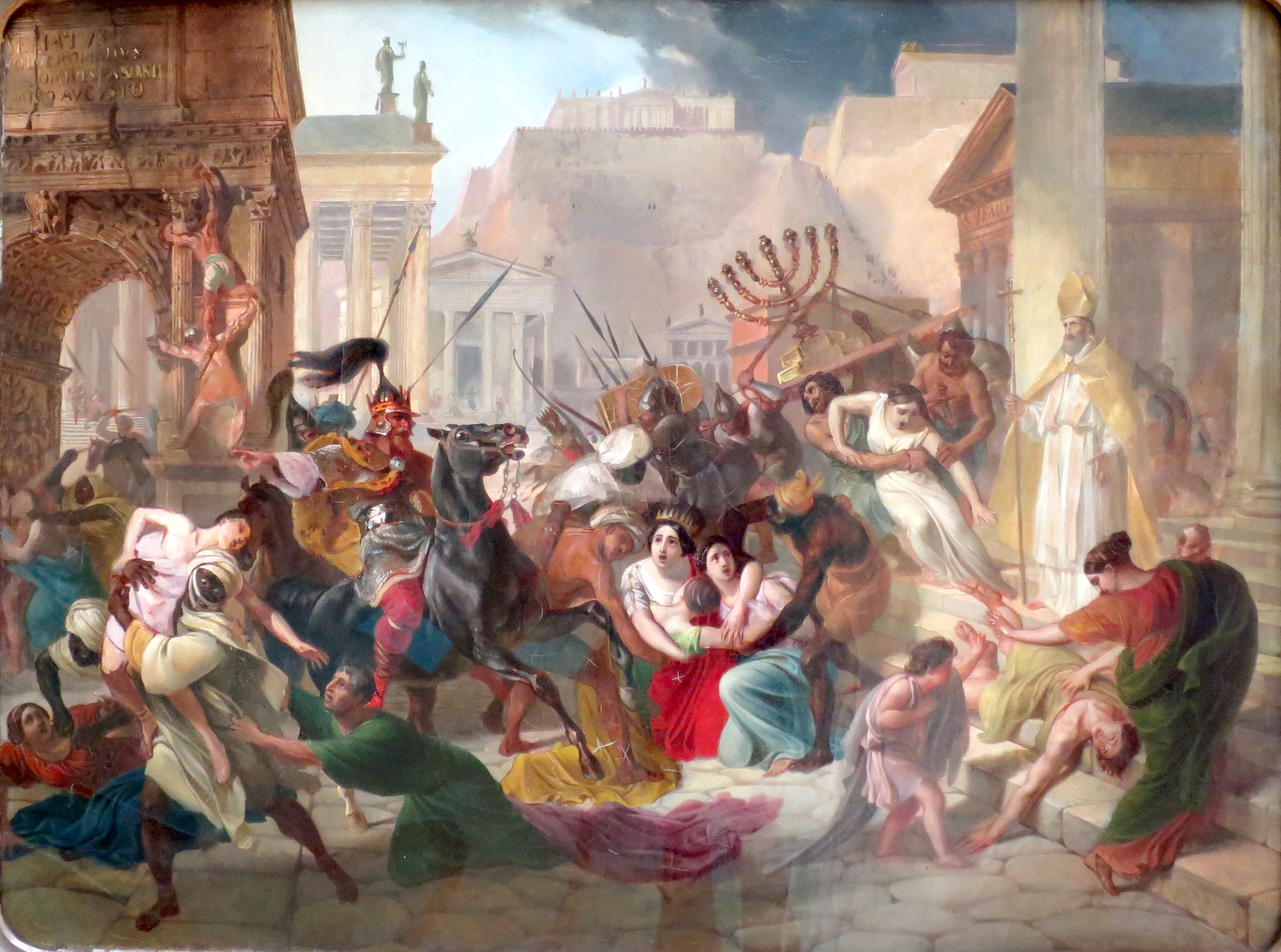
Geiseric sacking Rome in 455, painted by Karl Bryullov

In 455, the Vandal king Geiseric saw the usurpation of Maximus as an open violation of his treaty with the Romans, and an opportunity to invade Rome with his fleet. The city was plundered for two weeks (Sack of Rome). According to Johannes Malalas, who wrote a chronicle a century later, Geiseric was summoned by Eudoxia, the wife of the murdered emperor Valentinian III to avenge the murder of her husband. He captured Eudoxia and her two daughters, Eudocia and Placidia, when they tried to flee.

=== Destruction of the Roman fleet ===
In 460, the Roman army under the then emperor Majorian campaigned in Spain to strengthen Roman authority. While his generals defeated the Suebi in Lusitania (modern Santarém, Portugal), preparations were made for a campaign against the Vandals. The emperor assembled a large force with which he set out from Gaul to Carthaginensis, where his fleet was moored at Portus Illicitanus (near Elche). Geiseric, fearing the Roman invasion, tried to make peace with Majorian, who rejected this. Geiseric then used other means. Traitors paid by the Vandals set fire to the fleet on 13 May 460. Even before the army arrived, the fleet was destroyed. Majorian canceled the attack on the Vandals and had to disband the large army he had raised. In Arles he received messengers from Geiseric, with whom he agreed to make peace, which was probably a confirmation of the peace of 442. (Note: The treaty has not been preserved: it can be deduced from the fragment of Priscus (fr. 36.2) that it was not favourable to the Romans even though another fragment (fr. 38) makes it clear that the Vandals were not recognized for their power over Sicily. It is possible that the treaty was based on the one signed in 442.(Ch. Courtois, Les Vandales et l'Afrique, Paris 1955, p.199)) For Majorian, the failed campaign against the Vandals was a huge setback, which put an end to his plans to restore the empire to its former glory and also undermined his position as emperor of the west.

=== Ricimer's coup ===
In August 461, Majorian returned to Italy, where he was imprisoned by Ricimer, the commander-in-chief of the Roman army, and then murdered on August 7. Ricimer's coup plunged the Western Roman Empire into a huge crisis. In Gaul, the Burgundian and Gothic foederati, who had gained a high degree of independence in exchange for supporting Majorian, turned away from Roman authority, while Ricimer received little support from the Roman army outside Italy. The generals Aegidius in Gaul, Nepotianus in Spain and Marcellinus in Sicily resisted and refused to follow orders from Italy. The Gallic army seems to have declared Aeidius counter-emperor and in Sicily Marcellinus had ambitions in that direction.

== Start ==
=== Vandal occupation of the Western Isles ===
An interregnum of three months followed during which the title of Western emperor was not claimed. During this interregnum there was a political struggle for succession between Ricimer, the Eastern emperor Leo I, and Geiseric. Finally, Libius Severus (461-465) was put forward as emperor by Ricimer and inaugurated by the Senate in Ravenna on 19 November 461. The appointment was not recognized by the eastern part, which for the Vandals was a valid reason to break the peace treaty with the Romans. A new war with the Vandals broke out and at the end of 461, Geiseric's naval fleet captured the islands of Corsica, Sardinia, Malta and the Balearic Islands from the Romans and raided mainland Italy and Greece.

Ricimer, now the strongman in the west, was indeed lord and master in Italy, but in addition to the hostile attacks in the Mediterranean region, he had to deal with open military opposition from the generals Aegidius, Nepotianus and Marcellinus. In Marcellinus, who stayed south of Italy in Sicily, Ricimer saw a danger to his position. Ricimer turned to a ruse to get the able general out of his way. Marcellin's army consisted mainly of Hun auxiliary troops. Bribes from Ricimer induced the Huns to abandon Marcellin's service and enter his. Deprived of most of his troops, Marcellinus left for Dalmatia. However, Ricimer did not intervene militarily, because Marcellinus was supported by the Eastern Roman emperor Leo I. Nepotianus and Aetius no longer posed a danger to Ricimer after he managed to attract the Gothic and Burgundian foederati to him with generous favors.

=== Peace negotiations ===
After Marcellin's departure, Sicily was again ravaged by Vandal attacks, but Ricimer's negotiations had no effect. A peace mission under the umbrella of the Eastern Roman Emperor Leo in 462 was more successful. The ladies of the Theodosian house returned from their captivity. Eudocia, the bride of Huneric, was saved, but her mother Eudoxia and her sister Placidia were sent to Constantinople. In return, Geiseric negotiated for a certain portion of Valentinian III's property as the treasure of Eudocia. He had already occupied and annexed the Mauritanian provinces, as well as Sardinia, Corsica and the Balearic Islands, and planned to preserve the marriage of his son Huneric to Eudocia.

=== Vandal claim to the emperor ===
Geiseric's concession had a clear political purpose. The Vandal monarch now emerged as the champion of the Theodosian house against Ricimer and his upstart emperor. Placidia was married to Olybrius, a member of a prominent Roman family, and Geiseric demanded that Olybrius succeed to the throne in Italy. Threatened on the one hand by the Vandals, on the other by Marcellinus in Dalmatia, Ricimer and the obedient Senate asked for mediation from the Eastern Roman emperor. Leo was asked to bring about a reconciliation with Geiseric and Marcellinus. Leo agreed after which Marcellinus ceased hostilities. However, the envoys that Leo sent to Geiseric returned from Carthage without results. Geiseric claimed on behalf of his daughter-in-law that all her father's private property in Italy belonged to him, as well as the inheritance of Aetius, whose son Gaudentius he kept as a prisoner. In pursuit of those claims, Geiseric led a major expedition against Italy and Sicily and destroyed rural districts and undefended towns. Ricimer had little to say against that since his army and navy failed to stop the Vandals at sea.

=== Campaign against Aegidius ===
In 463 a confusing spectacle occurred, when Ricimer, in the name of the western emperor Libius Serverus, employed Goths to attack part of the Roman army in Gaul. When the battle was fought at Orleans, Aegidius was victorious. His rebellion was not curtailed until the autumn of 465, when he was murdered. At the time, Aegidius was engaged in negotiations with the Vandal king, Geiseric and attempted to build an alternative balance of western forces to challenge Ricimer's dominance.

=== Battle for Sicily and interregnum ===
In 464 or 465, Marcellinus again campaigned against the Vandals. By order of Emperor Leo I, he returned to Sicily to defend the island against the Vandals, which posed a direct threat to the personal power and prestige of Ricimer, who called on Leo to persuade Marcellinus not to undertake hostilities against him.

Emperor Libius Severus, who was no more than a puppet of Ricimer, died on 15 August 465. His cause of death is unknown: both murder and natural causes are possible. The elevation of Olybrius, which would have been a restitution of the Theodosian dynasty, may have seemed a hopeful solution to some of the difficulties of the situation, but the fact that he was Geiseric's candidate and relative was a reason not to accept him. A year and eight months after the death of Libius Severus, no successor had been appointed.

== Continuation of the war ==
=== Invasion of the Peloponnesus ===
In 467, the sea attacks by the Vandals became increasingly extensive. Geiseric's warships now also appeared off the coast of the Peloponnesus and Egypt. It was feared that there would be an attack on Alexandria, which would have consequences for the grain supply of the Eastern Roman capital. The threat explains why the Eastern Roman Emperor Leo I decided end standing by. He abandoned the diplomatic path and took steps to achieve closer cooperation with the Western Roman government in Italy.

Now that not only Italy and Sicily were threatened but also the trade of the entire Mediterranean, the forces of the East had to be united with those of Italy and Dalmatia against the African enemy. Leo agreed with Ricimir that Anthemius, general in the eastern army, would become the new emperor of the west. Ricimer's support was secured by an arrangement for him to marry Anthemius's daughter.

In the spring of 467, Anthemius, accompanied by Marcellinus, arrived with an army to Italy. After his accession to the throne on 12 April 467, a large-scale campaign against the Vandals was prepared, to be undertaken by an Eastern Roman fleet with land troops under the overall command of Emperor Leo's brother-in-law, Basiliscus. Anthemius appointed Marcellinus, also to counterbalance Ricimer, as second imperial general and commander-in-chief of the Western Roman troops involved in the campaign.

=== Plan of Attack ===
The attack plan that the Romans had in mind was based on the idea of having the eastern and western armies act together and attacking the Vandals simultaneously on three fronts. The eastern army therefore had to be divided into two. A sizable fleet was assembled, reputedly consisting of 1,113 ships, to carry an army of 100,000 men. Marcellinus, was ordered to conquer Sardinia and then sail to the coast of North Africa to link up with the eastern fleet under Basiliscus. Basiliscus would then sail directly to Carthage with the joint fleet. Heraclius, another general, would gather eastern forces in Egypt, disembark at Tripolitania, and then attack by land at Carthage. Procopius estimated the cost of the expedition at 130,000 pounds of gold; Joannes Laurentius Lydus estimated the cost at 65,000 pounds of gold and 750,000 pounds of silver.

=== The attack of the Romans ===
Marcellinus recaptured Sardinia with little difficulty, Heraclius met little resistance from the Vandals in Tripolitania, and both moved to make contact with Basiliscus's forces. According to Procopius, Basiliscus's fleet dispersed the Vandal fleet near Sicily, but Basiliscus did not take advantage of the advantage and rested his troops at Cape Bon, a strategic location 60 km away from Carthage. According to historians Michael Kulikowski, Friell and Williams, Geiseric appealed for peace and proposed a five-day armistice to give themselves time to prepare in the meantime. Heather notes that the Romans favoured avoiding a naval battle, which may have been the reason Basiliscus hesitated to take on the Vandals to attack.

=== The Defense of the Vandals ===
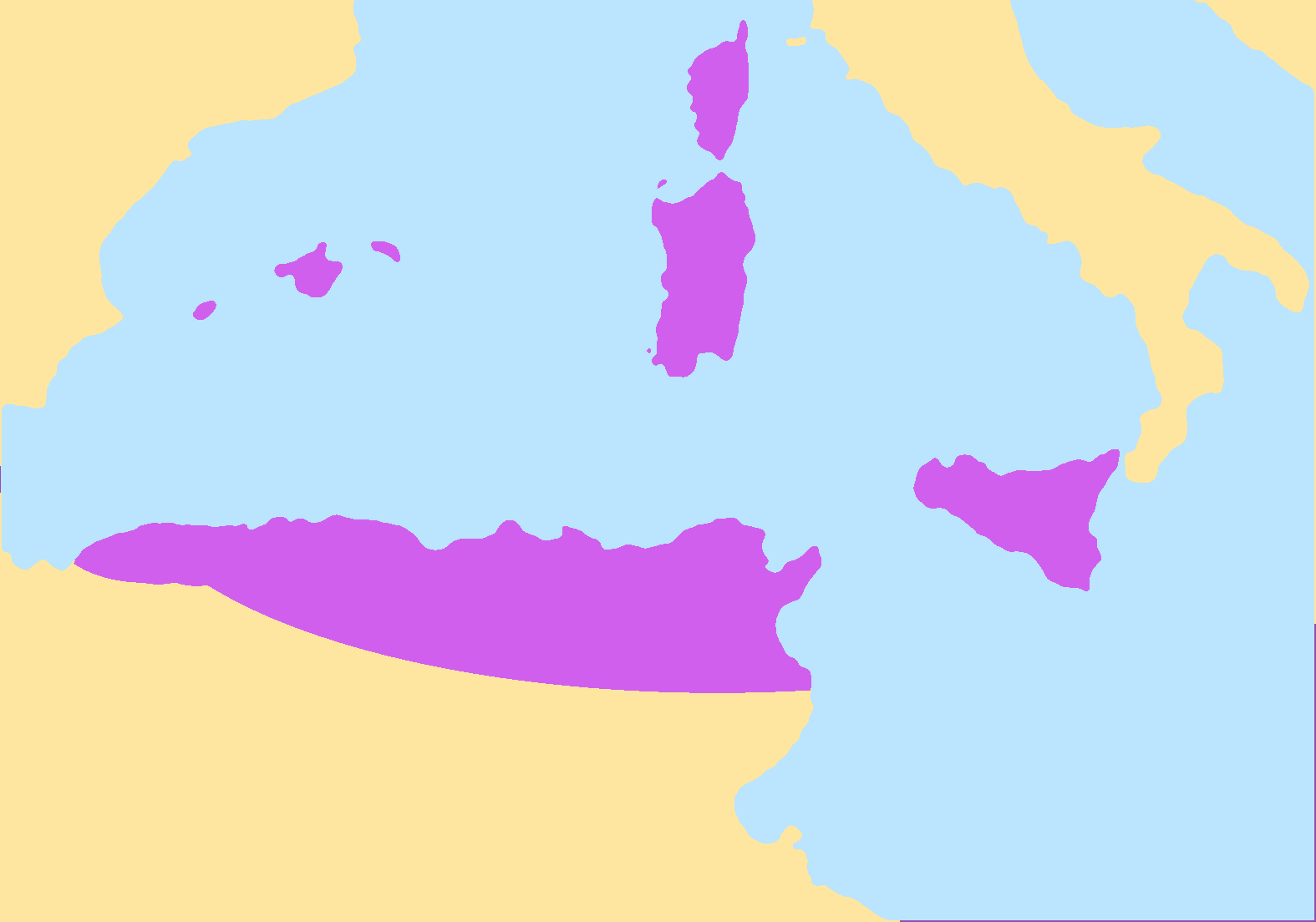
The Vandal Empire after its victory over the Romans in 468.

In the days allotted to him, Geiseric assembled a new fleet with a number of fireships and, aided by good winds, attacked the Roman fleet. The Roman fleet was defeated by the combination of the fireships, bad winds and surprise, with half of it destroyed. Basiliscus fled with the rest of the fleet to Sicily, to consolidate with Marcellin's forces; their morale and supplies might have secured a victory, but Marcellinus was murdered, possibly by order of Ricimer. Heraclius, who had not yet reached Carthage, returned to the Eastern Roman Empire by retracing the path he had taken, and Basiliscus returned to Constantinople with half his fleet.

== Aftermath and consequences ==
The poor result that the Romans achieved with the large-scale operation at the end of the Vandal War must have had a major morale effect. The Roman Empire had brought all its strength to bear and had failed in its mission to destroy the Vandal Empire. According to Heather the battle considered to have ended the Western Roman Empire's chances of survival. Without access to the resources of the former Roman province of Africa, the west could not sustain an army powerful enough to defeat its numerous enemies.

Nevertheless, it took two years for Geiseric to regain enough confidence to resume his attacks on Italy. In 472, Ricimer's western regime came to terms with Geiseric, making his son's brother-in-law, Olybrius, emperor. Geiseric did not make peace with the Eastern Roman Empire until 476. He concluded a treaty with the new emperor Zeno entitled Eternal Peace. The treaty was fairly faithfully observed on both sides under his successors. A revolution in Carthage in 531 finally gave the Roman Empire, which then existed only in the East, the desired opportunity for intervention and led to the Vandal War (533–534).
