= Gothic War (457–458) =

Gothic War of 457–458
- Part of the Fall of the Roman Empire; Gothic Wars and Roman–Germanic Wars
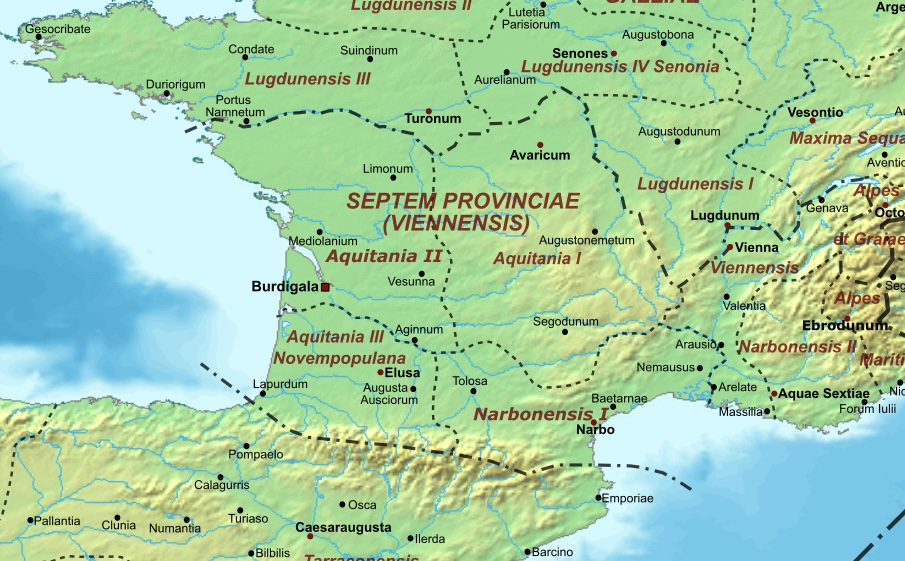
- Map of Southern France
Date	457–458
Location	Gaul
Result	Roman victory

Belligerents
Western Roman Empire	Visigoths

Commanders and leaders
Majorian; Aegidius; Nepotianus	Theoderic II; Frederic

Strength
20.000	10.000-15.000

Casualties and losses
Unknown	Unknown

The Gothic War of 457–458 was a military conflict between the Visigoths of Theoderic II against the Western Roman Empire of Emperor Majorian. The war began in 457 with a revolt of the Goths in Aquitania that pushed aside Roman authority, followed by an aggressive conquest in the adjacent Septimania aimed at area expansion. The war ended with a Roman victory over the Goths in the Battle of Arles in 458.

== Sources ==
The most important contemporary sources in which this war is reported are the Gallo-Roman writer Sidonius Apollinaris (431-489) and the bishop of Chaves Hydatius (400-469). Furthermore, the Historia Francorum (history of the Franks) of Gregory of Tours (535-594) is an early source.

== Historical context ==
In the run-up to this war, there was a crisis situation within the Western Roman Empire. Emperor Avitus was deposed in October 456 by the rebelling generals Ricimer and Majorian and then assassinated. In the Gallic provinces, the Gallo-Roman aristocracy rebelled against this deposition and appealed to the Burgundian and Visigothic allies. The Visigothic King Theodoric II (453 - 466) was staying in Spain at that time where he campaigned against the Suebi along with the Bourgondian king Gundioc. When they reached the news of the deposition of the emperor and the revolt in Gaul, Theoderic left command to his generals Sunerik and Cyrila and returned to Toulouse, while Gundioc and his entire army returned to the mountains of Saudia.

The recently appointed emperor in the east Leo I, who was now also emperor of the west until he had appointed a successor, inherited a difficult relationship with the west from his predecessors. He was initially unwilling to cooperate with the rebellious generals, but lacked sufficient influence to impose his will on the West. In the end, the extremely unstable situation in the west asked for a solution that made him dwell on the two generals who served in Italy.

Leo appointed Ricimer as patricius e magister militum commander-in-chief with the title of Patrician and Majorian as magister militum, making Majorianus the subordinate of Ricimer. In doing so, he insulted Majorianus who, with the support of the Senate, forced Leo to appoint him to Caesar on April 1, 457. When Leo hesitated to acknowledge him, Majorian proclaimed himself emperor of the west on December 28, 457, with the support of the Senate and the army.

The Gallic aristocracy considered Majorian elevation to emperor by the Senate as usurpation and put forward their own candidate Marcellinus as successor to Avitus. To strengthen themselves against Roman power in Italy, they sought support from the Burgundians and Visigoths. A delegation representing several cities in addition to the senatorial nobility turned to Gundioc and sent an envoy to the emperor in the east. In exchange for more territory, the Burgundian king supported the Gallo-Romans and sent militias to the cities. The Visigothic king Theodoric also lined up behind the insurgents.

== The War ==
=== Start ===
The interregnum lasted months after the death of Avitus. Most of the Gallic cities and aristocracy were turned away from Italy, and Generals Ricimer and Majorian were unsure what to do now. Taking advantage of the situation, Theoderic saw opportunities to found his own state on Roman soil. In the course of 457 he put aside the treaty with the Romans and rebelled, with which the war began. In Aquitaine he drew all power towards him and ordered his brother Frederik to conquer the adjacent region Septimania. The answer to this from the formal authority in Italy was long overdue. An invasion of northern Italy by the Alemanni and the southern Vandals caused Ricimer and Majorian to focus their attention on other matters than the Visigoths in Gaul. Yet they had a windfall with the imperial army in Gaul which was partly under the command of Aegidius, a general who declared himself loyal to Majorian. With this they still had a card in their hands that would soon be deployed.

The advance of the Goths in the south continued now that they encountered no opposition. Frederick conquered Septimania and Theodoric II seized Narbonne which gave the Goths access to the Mediterranean. This port city fell into his hands without violence thanks to the betrayal of the Roman general Agrippinus who, unlike Aegidius, had turned away from Majorian. According to Mathisens, he belonged to the Gallic insurgents who had turned to the Burgundians. Nevertheless, after the conquest of Septimania, the Visigoths clashed with the Gallic field army led by Aegidus. Majorianus had appointed him magister militum per Gallias, replacing Agrippinus, and given the order to put things in order in Gaul. At Arles, the Visigoths clashed with the Romans, with Aegidius being cut short. After his defeat, he withdrew from the south.

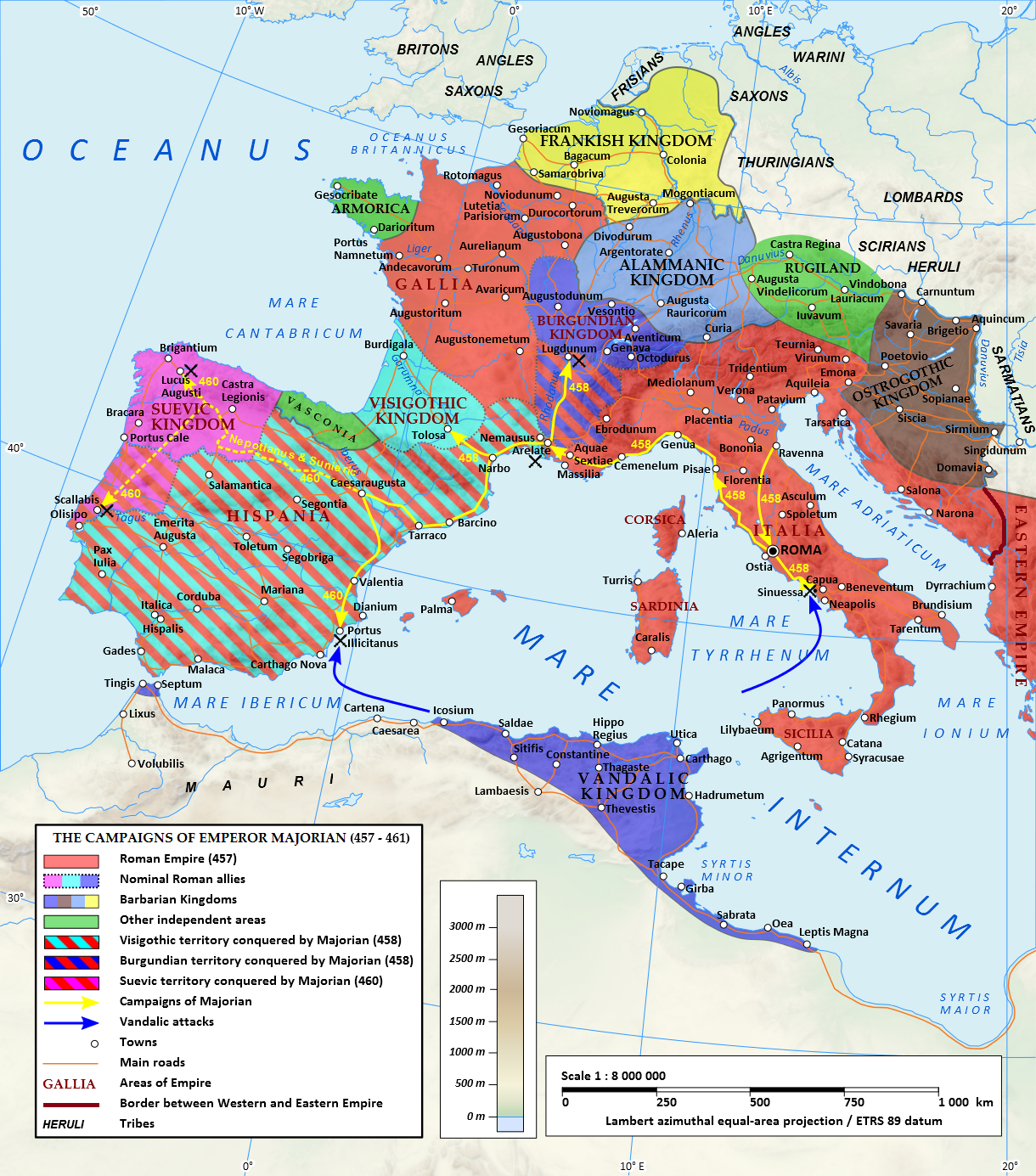
Military campaigns during the Gothic War

=== Defense of Italy ===
Recimer and Majorian could not send reinforcements now that they themselves were confronted with external incursions in Italy. From Raetia, the Alemanni penetrated Italian territory as far as Lake Maggiore. There they were intercepted and defeated by the troops of comes Burco, sent by Majorian to stop them. A group of Vandals landed in Campania in the summer of 457, at the mouth of the Garigliano River, and began to destroy and plunder the region. Majorian personally led the Roman army to a victory over the invaders at Sinuessa killing many of them.

=== The campaign in Gaul ===
Only after consolidating his position in Italy could Majorian concentrate on restoring power in Gaul. Before that, he first had to strengthen the Roman army. Unlike under Aetius, at this stage the Roman army no longer had the manpower and logistics to maintain itself as before. Majorianus recruited barbarians en masse to bring the army to strength. Some of these were Huns under a certain Tuldila, who came from a group that settled on the Danube during the collapse of Attila's empire. Others were Rugi, Gepids, Heruli and Goths from Noricum and Pannonia, and it is likely that Majorianus agreed to formally recognize the territory and income they controlled in exchange for their military services. He may also have withdrawn some of the remaining Pannonian Limitanei Be that as it may, from the military commander of Dalmatia Marcellinus he received support consisting of supplying troops and fleet units.

With his new federated troops, Majorian had assembled a force of as many as 10,000 men. He appointed Nepotianus as his second general in rank behind Ricimer and then marched across the Alps towards Gaul. Here Aegidius's army joined him, who had meanwhile strengthened with Frankish auxiliary troops, and their army now amounted to 20,000 men, with which the Roman army was considerably stronger than the armed forces that Theodoric could oppose.

With the bulk of his army, supplemented by loyal foederati and accompanied by his generals Aegidius and Nepotianus, Majorian marched in 458 against the Gallic insurgents who had united with the Burgundians of Gundioc. They entered the Rhone Valley and defeated the Burgundians even before they could have retreated into Lugdunum. Then it was the turn of the rebellious Gallic cities in the south, which surrendered one by one to Majorian.

=== The Battle of Arles ===
After this, the Romans marched against the Visigoths of Theoderic and his army, who were besieging Aegidius at Arelate (now Arles), at the mouth of the river Rhodanus (Rhône). The resulting battle was an overwhelming defeat for the Goths. The Roman army was supreme in battle and won the battle. The defeated Visigoths fled after the defeat and King Theodoric II narrowly escaped death.

== End ==
The Visigothic army fled to Toulouse where they were enclosed by the Roman army. After a brief siege, the king surrendered and peace talks began. In the peace that Majorian forced the Visigoths, they had to give up their settlements in Spain and Gaul and return within the limits of their settlement area in Aquitaine according to the original foederati treaty with the Romans from 418.

== Bibliography ==
- Heather, Peter (2006), The Fall of the Roman Empire, Oxford University Press
- Hughes, Ian (2015), Patricians and Emperors, Pen & Sword Books Ltd
- Jones, Arnold Hugh Martin; Martindale, J. R.; Morris, J. (1980). The Prosopography of the Later Roman Empire: Volume 2, AD 395–527. Cambridge: Cambridge University Press. ISBN 978-0-521-20159-9.
- Wolfram, Herwig (1990). History of the Goths. University of California Press. ISBN 9780520069831.
- Escher, Katalin (2006), Les Burgondes: Ie-VIe siècle apr. J.-C., Paris, Éditions Errance, coll. (ISBN 2-87772-325-9)
- Schultheis, E (2019), The battle of the Calalaunian fields, AD 451, Pen & Sword Books Ltd
- MacGeorge, Penny (2002), Late Roman Warlords, Oxford Academic
