= 460 =

460 in various calendars
- Gregorian calendar: 460; CDLX
- Ab urbe condita: 1213
- Assyrian calendar: 5210
- Balinese saka calendar: 381–382
- Bengali calendar: −134 – −133
- Berber calendar: 1410
- Buddhist calendar: 1004
- Burmese calendar: −178
- Byzantine calendar: 5968–5969
- Chinese calendar: 己亥年 (Earth Pig); 3157 or 2950 — to — 庚子年 (Metal Rat); 3158 or 2951
- Coptic calendar: 176–177
- Discordian calendar: 1626
- Ethiopian calendar: 452–453
- Hebrew calendar: 4220–4221
- Hindu calendars
- Vikram Samvat: 516–517
- Shaka Samvat: 381–382
- Kali Yuga: 3560–3561
- Holocene calendar: 10460
- Iranian calendar: 162 BP – 161 BP
- Islamic calendar: 167 BH – 166 BH
- Javanese calendar: 345–346
- Julian calendar: 460; CDLX
- Korean calendar: 2793
- Minguo calendar: 1452 before ROC 民前1452年
- Nanakshahi calendar: −1008
- Seleucid era: 771/772 AG
- Thai solar calendar: 1002–1003
- Tibetan calendar: ས་མོ་ཕག་ལོ་ (female Earth-Boar); 586 or 205 or −567 — to — ལྕགས་ཕོ་བྱི་བ་ལོ་ (male Iron-Rat); 587 or 206 or −566

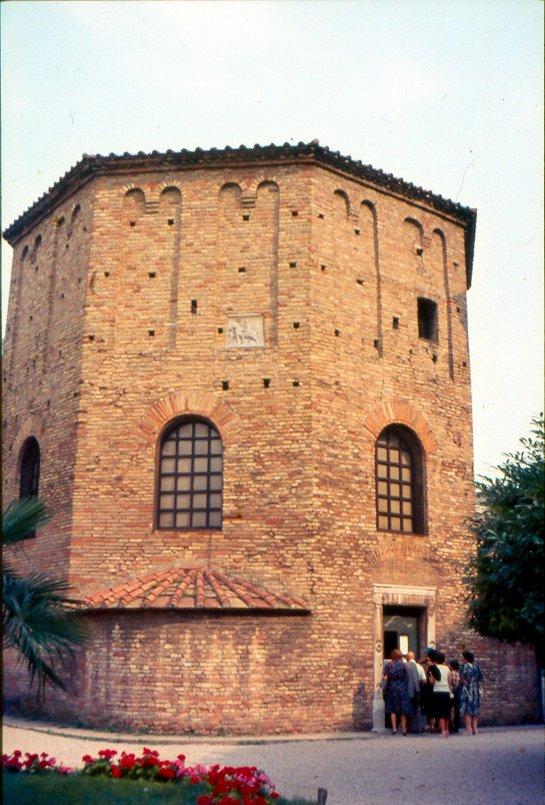
The Baptistry of Neon (Ravenna)

Year 460 (CDLX) was a leap year starting on Friday of the Julian calendar. At the time, it was known as the Year of the Consulship of Magnus and Apollonius (or, less frequently, year 1213 Ab urbe condita). The denomination 460 for this year has been used since the early medieval period, when the Anno Domini calendar era became the prevalent method in Europe for naming years.

== Events ==
=== By place ===
==== Roman Empire ====
- Emperor Majorian gathers an expeditionary force (Alans and other barbarians) in Liguria, and enters Aquitaine after a long march, where he visits King Theodoric II at Toulouse.
- Majorian invades Hispania; his generals Nepotianus and Sunieric lead a Visigoth army into Gallaecia. The Suebi are defeated and Lusitania (modern Portugal) is conquered.
- King Genseric, fearing a Roman invasion, tries to negotiate peace with Majorian, who refuses. The Vandals devastate Mauretania and Moorish warriors poison the wells.
- Majorian assembles a large fleet in Nova Carthago (Cartagena) in preparation for an invasion of the Vandal Kingdom in Africa. However, King Genseric organizes an attack on the fleet, using individuals sympathetic to the Vandals to conduct the raid. The fleet is destroyed and the expedition is abandoned.
- Emperor Leo I founds the Excubitors (imperial guard) at Constantinople; this elite tagmatic unit (300 men) is recruited from among the warlike Isaurians (approximate date).

==== Europe ====
- March 27 (night) – Swabians invade the Gallic city of Lugo. The governor is killed.

==== Asia ====
- The Hepthalites (White Huns) conquer the remnants of the Kushan Empire and enter India.
- A famine that will last for several years begins in the Persian Empire (approximate date).

=== By topic ===
==== Art ====
- The remodeling of the dome of Baptistry of Neon at Ravenna (Italy) is finished.
- The Ajanta Caves (India) are completed (cut into the volcanic rock and elaborately painted).
- The seated Buddha in the Yungang Grottoes, Datong (Shanxi), is made (approximate date).

==== Religion ====
- The Coptic Orthodox Church (Egypt) splits from the Chalcedonian Orthodox Church of Alexandria.
- Gennadius I, patriarch of Constantinople, banishes Timothy II, patriarch of Alexandria.

== Births ==
- Saint Kessog in Cashel, an Irish missionary
- Budic II, king of Brittany (approximate date)
- Hilderic, king of the Vandals and Alans (approximate date)
- Romulus Augustulus, last emperor of the Western Roman Empire (approximate date)
- Sanghapala, Mon-Khmer monk (d. 524)

== Deaths ==
- October 20 – Aelia Eudocia, Roman empress and wife of Theodosius II
- Ardaric, king of the Gepids (approximate date)
- Juqu Anzhou, prince of the Chinese Xiongnu states Northern Liang
- Maldras, king of the Sueves
- Isaac of Antioch, Syriac theologian
