= Battle of Cape Bon (468) =

Naval battle between Vandals and Romans

- Part of the Fall of the Roman Empire; Roman–Germanic Wars and Vandalic War (461–468)
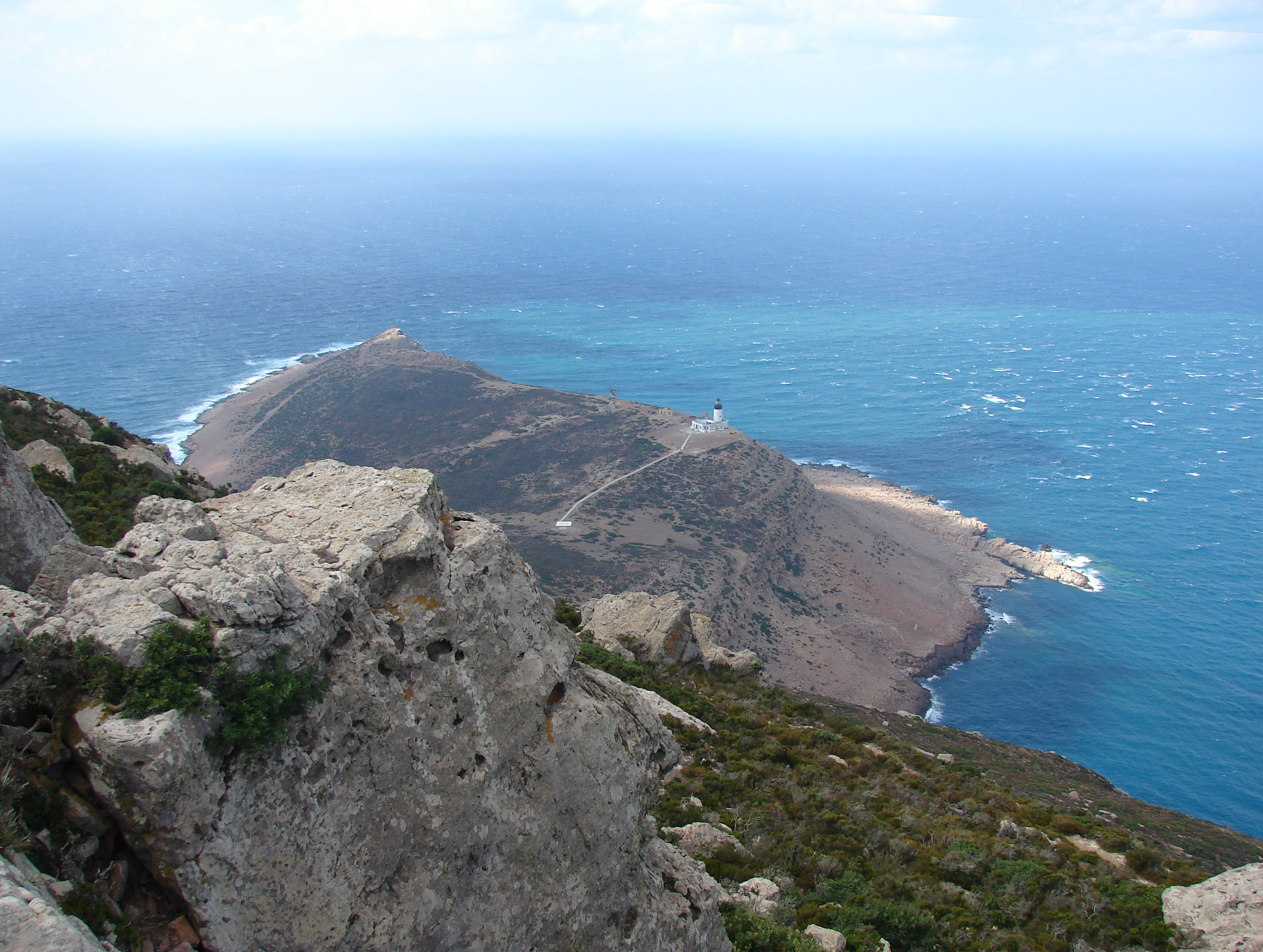
- Cape Bon, in modern Tunisia
Date	468
Location	Mercury Promontory, Vandalia (today Cape Bon, Tunisia)
Result	Vandal and Alan victory

Belligerents
Vandal-Alan Kingdom	Western Roman Empire; Eastern Roman Empire

Commanders and leaders
Gaiseric	Basiliscus (AWOL); Marcellinus; Heraclius of Edessa

Strength
Unknown	50,000 soldiers 1,113 ships

Casualties and losses
Unknown	100 ships 10,000 killed

The Battle of Cape Bon was an engagement during a joint military expedition of the Western and Eastern Roman Empires led by Basiliscus against the Vandal capital of Carthage in 468. The invasion of the kingdom of the Vandals was one of the largest amphibious operations in antiquity, with 1,113 ships and over 50,000 personnel.

While attempting to land near Carthage at the Cape of Mercury (Latin: Promontorium Mercurii; Greek: Ἑρμαία Ἄκρα; now Cape Bon or, in French, Cap Bon), the Roman fleet was thrown into disorder by a Vandal fireship attack that took advantage of favourable wind conditions. The Vandal fleet followed up on the action and sank over 100 Roman ships. Some 10,000 Roman soldiers and sailors died in the battle. The Roman expedition was now too scattered to land its troops, leading to its complete failure.

The battle is considered to have ended the Western Roman Empire's chances of survival. Without access to the resources of the former Roman province of Africa, the west could not sustain an army powerful enough to defeat its numerous enemies.

== Background ==
By 435, the Vandals under their king Gaiseric, had established the Vandal kingdom of Africa. In 455, Gaiseric sacked Rome, the former capital of the Western Roman Empire, and the Empress Licinia Eudoxia (widow of Emperor Valentinian III) and her daughters had been taken as hostages.

The plan was concerted between Eastern Emperor Leo, Western Emperor Anthemius, and General Marcellinus, who enjoyed independence in Illyricum. Basiliscus was ordered to sail directly to Carthage, while Marcellinus attacked and took Sardinia, and a third army, commanded by Heraclius of Edessa, landed on the Libyan coast east of Carthage, making rapid progress. It appears that the combined forces met in Sicily, whence the three fleets moved at different periods.

Procopius records that Basiliscus, brother-in-law to Emperor Leo, had been selected as general by the emperor in hope he would balance the growing influence of the Alan Magister militum Aspar who sought to control Leo; however, Basiliscus sought the friendship of Aspar to further his own designs on the throne, and Aspar "repeatedly urged upon Basiliscus that he should spare the Vandals and Genseric".

Ancient and modern historians provided different estimates for the number of ships and troops commanded by Basiliscus, as well as for the expenses of the expedition, although both were enormous sums. According to the text of Priscus, 100,000 ships were assembled, although modern scholars have emended this to 1100, which is closer to Cedrenus's figure of 1,113 vessels. Peter Heather estimates a strength of 30,000 soldiers for the expedition and 50,000 total, when including sailors and the additional forces of Marcellinus and Heraclius. The figures for the money spent on this expedition ranges from the 1,300 centaria of gold reported by Priscus and Procopius (130,000 Roman pounds), to the 64,000 pounds of gold and 700,000 pounds of silver by John Lydus and to 65,000 of gold and 700,000 of silver by Candidus.

== Battle ==
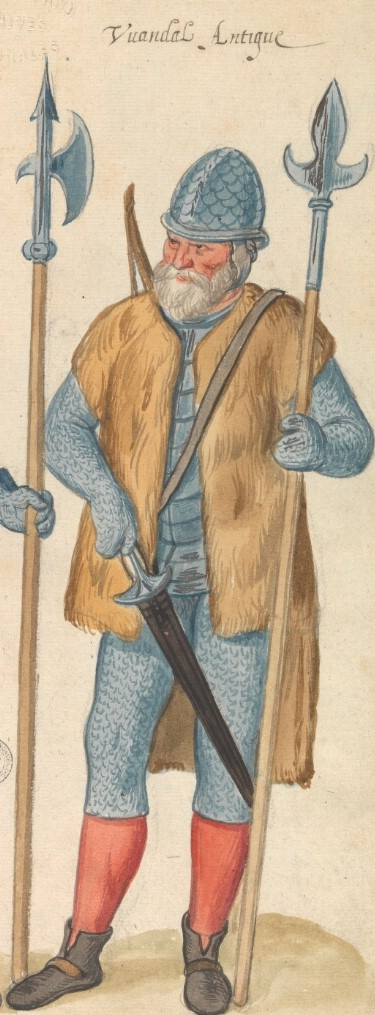
A 16th century perception of the Vandals, illustrated in the manuscript "Théâtre de tous les peuples et nations de la terre avec leurs habits et ornemens divers, tant anciens que modernes, diligemment depeints au naturel". Painted by Lucas d'Heere in the 2nd half of the 16th century. Preserved in the Ghent University Library.

Sardinia and Libya were already conquered by Marcellinus and Heraclius, when Basiliscus cast anchor off Cape Bon, opposite Sicily, about forty miles from Carthage. Gaiseric asked Basiliscus to allow him five days to draw up conditions for a peace. During the negotiations, Gaiseric gathered his ships and suddenly attacked the Roman fleet. The Vandals had filled many vessels with combustible materials. During the night, these fire ships were propelled against the unguarded and unsuspecting Roman fleet. The Byzantine commanders tried to rescue some ships from destruction, but these manoeuvres were blocked by the attack of other Vandal vessels. Basiliscus fled in the heat of the battle.

One act of heroism stands forth from this naval defeat. Despite the situation, Basiliscus's lieutenant, Joannes, bravely fought the Vandal onslaught; Procopius describes him as "standing on the deck" and "turning from side to side kept killing very great numbers of the enemy". Upon seeing that his ship was about to be captured, he refused to surrender to Genso, the son of Gaiseric, instead leaping overboard in heavy armor and drowning himself. His last words were that he "would never come under the hands of dogs".

== Aftermath ==
One half of the Roman fleet was burned, sunk, or captured, and the other half followed the fugitive Basiliscus. The whole expedition had failed. Heraclius effected his retreat through the desert into Tripolitania, holding the position for two years until recalled; Marcellinus retired to Sicily, where he was reached by Basiliscus; the general was, however, assassinated, perhaps at the instigation of Ricimer, by one of his own captains; and the king of the Vandals expressed his surprise and satisfaction that the Romans themselves would remove from the world his most formidable antagonists.

After returning to Constantinople, Basiliscus hid in the church of Hagia Sophia to escape the wrath of the people and the revenge of the Emperor. By the mediation of Verina, Basiliscus obtained the Imperial pardon, and was punished merely with banishment to Heraclea Sintica, in Thrace.

The treasuries of the Eastern Roman Empire were now empty. Peter Heather considers the expedition to have been the last chance to save the Western Roman Empire, which controlled only the Italian peninsula and Sicily. Without the revenue stream from the former Roman province of Africa, the west was incapable of sustaining its army.

== Bibliography ==
- Heather, P. (2006). The Fall of the Roman Empire: A New History (1st ed.). New York City: Oxford University Press. ISBN 978-0-19-532541-6.
