= 458 =

458 in various calendars
- Gregorian calendar: 458; CDLVIII
- Ab urbe condita: 1211
- Assyrian calendar: 5208
- Balinese saka calendar: 379–380
- Bengali calendar: −136 – −135
- Berber calendar: 1408
- Buddhist calendar: 1002
- Burmese calendar: −180
- Byzantine calendar: 5966–5967
- Chinese calendar: 丁酉年 (Fire Rooster); 3155 or 2948 — to — 戊戌年 (Earth Dog); 3156 or 2949
- Coptic calendar: 174–175
- Discordian calendar: 1624
- Ethiopian calendar: 450–451
- Hebrew calendar: 4218–4219
- Hindu calendars
- Vikram Samvat: 514–515
- Shaka Samvat: 379–380
- Kali Yuga: 3558–3559
- Holocene calendar: 10458
- Iranian calendar: 164 BP – 163 BP
- Islamic calendar: 169 BH – 168 BH
- Javanese calendar: 343–344
- Julian calendar: 458; CDLVIII
- Korean calendar: 2791
- Minguo calendar: 1454 before ROC 民前1454年
- Nanakshahi calendar: −1010
- Seleucid era: 769/770 AG
- Thai solar calendar: 1000–1001
- Tibetan calendar: མེ་མོ་བྱ་ལོ་ (female Fire-Bird); 584 or 203 or −569 — to — ས་ཕོ་ཁྱི་ལོ་ (male Earth-Dog); 585 or 204 or −568

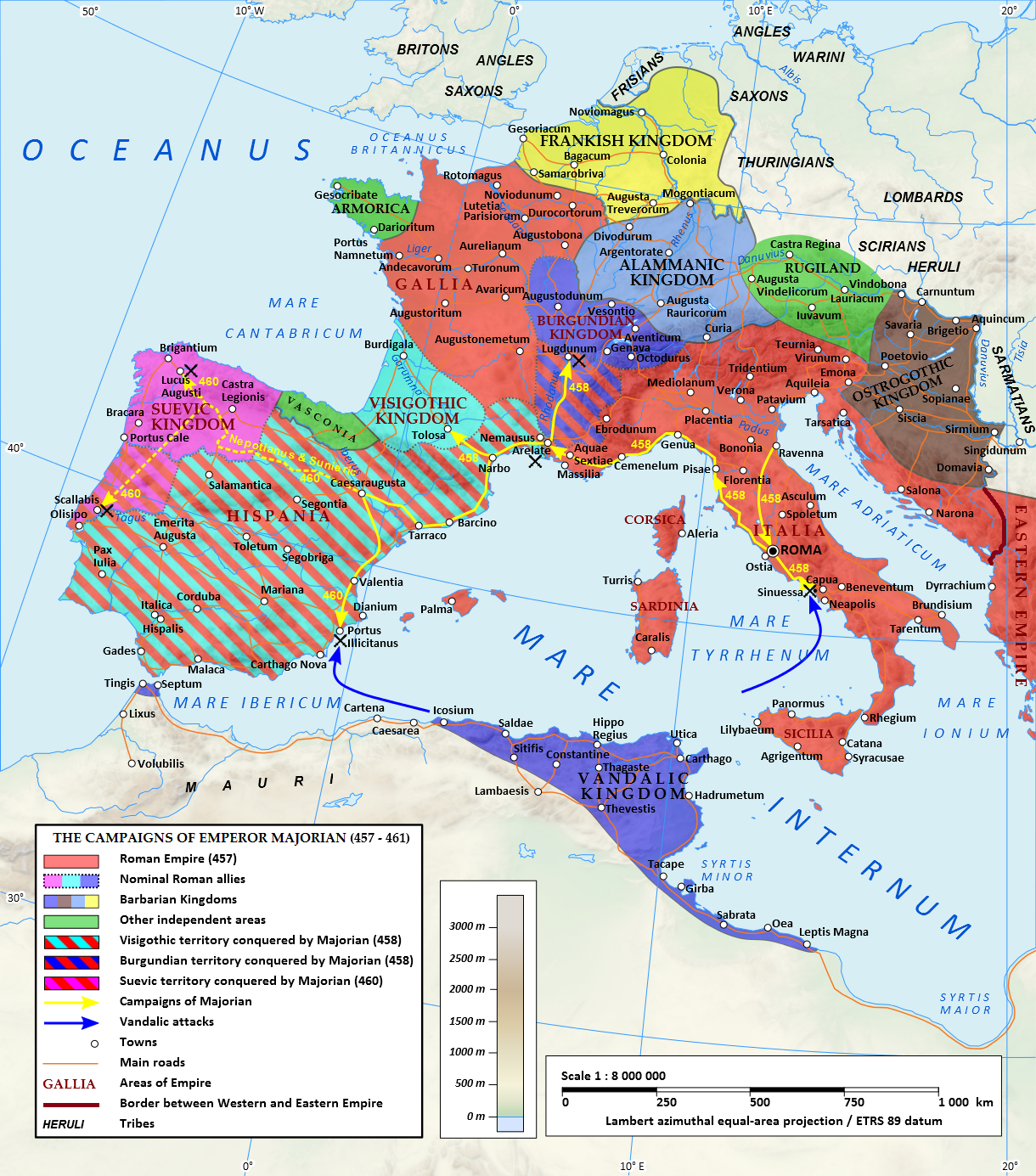
Campaign of emperor Majorian (458–461)

Year 458 (CDLVIII) was a common year starting on Wednesday of the Julian calendar. At the time, it was known as the Year of the Consulship of Maiorianus and Leo (or, less frequently, year 1211 Ab urbe condita). The denomination 458 for this year has been used since the early medieval period, when the Anno Domini calendar era became the prevalent method in Europe for naming years.

== Events ==
=== By place ===
==== Roman Empire ====
- Emperor Majorian builds a Roman fleet at Miseno and Ravenna. He strengthens the army, by recruiting a large number of barbarian mercenaries (Bastarnae, Burgundians, Huns, Ostrogoths, Rugii, Scythians and Suebi).
- Summer – The Vandals land in Campania, at the mouth of the Liri or the Garigliano River, and devastate the region. Majorian personally leads the Roman army and defeats the invaders near Sinuessa, destroying their ships on the seashore, loaded with booty.
- Battle of Arelate: Majorian defeats the Visigoths under King Theodoric II at Arles (Southern Gaul), near the Rhone River. Theodoric is forced to sign a peace treaty and becomes a foederatus (pl. foederati) of the Western Roman Empire.
- Winter – Majorian enters the Rhone Valley, and defeats the Burgundians under King Gondioc at Lugdunum. He forces the Bagaudae to join the western coalition against the Suebi in Spain.

==== Europe ====
- Childeric I succeeds his father Merovech as king of the Salian Franks. He establishes his capital at Tournai (modern Belgium) and becomes a foederatus (pl. foederati) of the Western Roman Empire.

==== Asia ====
- Jabi becomes the king of the Korean kingdom of Silla.

=== By topic ===
==== Exploration and Colonization ====
- The city of Tbilisi (Georgia) on the Kura River is founded by King Vakhtang I of Iberia. Its location gives it control of the trade routes between western and eastern Transcaucasia.

==== Religion ====
- July 3 – Gennadius I becomes patriarch of Constantinople.

== Births ==
- Damascius, Syrian neoplatonist (approximate date)
- Xiao Zhangmao, crown prince of Southern Qi (d. 493)

== Deaths ==
- July 3 – Anatolius, patriarch of Constantinople
- Nulji, king of Silla (Korea)
