= Andreas Alföldi =

Hungarian historian (1895-1981)

- Alföldi András
- Born: 27 August 1895; Pomáz, Austria-Hungary
- Died: 12 February 1981 (aged 85); Princeton, New Jersey, U.S.
- Spouse: Elisabeth Alföldi-Rosenbaum
- Awards: Medal of the Royal Numismatic Society (1953)
- Scientific career
- Fields: History of late antiquity
- Workplaces: University of Debrecen; University of Budapest; Princeton University

András (Andreas) Ede Zsigmond Alföldi (27 August 1895 – 12 February 1981) was a Hungarian historian, art historian, epigraphist, numismatist and archaeologist, specializing in the Late Antique period. He was one of the most productive 20th-century scholars of the ancient world and is considered one of the leading researchers of his time. Although some of his research results are controversial, his work in several areas is viewed as groundbreaking.

Professor Alföldi contributed significantly to the massive Cambridge Ancient History, including Vol. 12: The Imperial Crisis and Recovery. He became a professor at the Institute for Advanced Study in 1955.

== Life and career ==
The son of a doctor, Alföldi was born in 1895 in the Austro-Hungarian empire. Although the family finances were damaged after the death of his father in 1910, Alföldi was able to begin his studies of classical history after his graduation from high school. His first area of interest was in classical numismatics, which at the time was a neglected area of study in Hungary.

Like many middle class young men of his age, Alföldi participated in World War I. He was a highly decorated soldier, and after sustaining a severe injury, he was dismissed from the military in 1917. In later years he looked back on his service with pride and he retained an interest in military and strategic subjects throughout his life.

The Treaty of Trianon, which officially ended the war in Hungary and established its borders, was perceived as a humiliation to the country. This strengthened Alföldi's interest in regional history. In the aftermath of World War I, national ties and boundaries that had been established over hundreds of years were dissolved and rebuilt. As was not uncommon in the years between the wars, archeology served to strengthen national identity.

In 1923, Alföldi was appointed chair of Ancient History at the University of Debrecen. In 1930, he was appointed to a prestigious chair at the University of Budapest. Over the next 15 years Alföldi shaped the field of ancient history and archeology in Hungary, and was also recognized as an outstanding scholar by the international community. His work transformed the Danube and Carpathian regions into some of the most thoroughly researched areas of the former Roman Empire. Particular areas of interest were the Roman Empire's Crisis of the Third Century, the history and culture of Eurasian herders and horsemen and the imagery and representation of Roman emperors in late antiquity.

Alföldi's work was not interrupted by the second world war, but the post-war influence of the Soviet Union over the Hungarian state put an end to his research. He emigrated to Switzerland in 1947. Although most of his research materials remained behind in Budapest, the continued to contribute to the field of classical studies and archaeology. He was awarded the medal of the Royal Numismatic Society in 1953.

In 1956, Alföldi accepted a position in the Institute for Advanced Study's School of Historical Studies. The position afforded better pay and more opportunities for travel, and Alföldi would continue to work on projects at Princeton even after his retirement. While at Princeton, he married his second wife, Elisabeth Alföldi-Rosenbaum, who was also a classical scholar and art historian.

After emigrating, Alföldi expanded his areas of research into early Roman history and the eventual demise of the empire. In Alföldi's obituary, Géza Alföldy said: "He illuminated the history of Rome from the beginning to end like no other scholar in this century."

== Work ==
=== Early Rome ===
In Afoldi's opinion, the importance of Rome in the Etruscan period was far less than was later portrayed. He attempted to compare the oldest structures of the Roman state with the Eurasian horsemen and herdsmen. Although his theories were not received with a wholly positive response, even his critics recognized the originality of his arguments. In addition to archeological and later literary sources, he employed the methods of comparative religion in his work.

=== The fall of the Roman Republic ===
Alföldi's work regarding the downfall of the Roman Republic was marked by his thesis that Julius Caesar intended to establish a monarchy along the old Roman pattern. He believed that he found evidence that confirmed this theory in the coinage of the year 44BC. Alföldi defended Caesar in this. Like Theodor Mommsen, Alföldi was fascinated by the personality of Caesar and disappointed by the “opportunism” of Cicero. Although he saw Cicero as the ideological instigator of Caesar's murder, he also considered Cicero to be an artist of nature. The murder of Caesar attested to the blindness and scrupulousness of the senatorial oligarchy, which in turn no way supported a republican order. In his eyes, the outrage against Caesar arose from the conflict between the Greek-influenced upper class, and with Caesar, who bore the stamp of the native Roman tradition.

He based his work on Octavian's rise primarily on literary sources. Here he highlighted not only the emotional and religious grounds for Octavian's approach after Caesar's death, but also the underlying tangible economic aspects.

=== Study of the Roman Empire ===
“The Design of the Monarchical Ceremony at the Roman Imperial Court” (1934 ) and “Insignia and Costume of the Roman Empire” (1935) mark the pinnacle of Alföldi's work. In these two essays he describes both the religious foundations as well as the continuous development and official expressions of Roman rulers’ ideology. In these articles Alföldi again connects numismatic, literary, epigraphic, and archaeological studies. His understanding of the ancient imagery and of their abstraction to small coin designs was particularly praised. These studies provided a basis for further exploration of the world of ideas and representation within the empire.

In the absence of comprehensive written sources for Roman history in the middle and the second half of the 3rd Century, in the time of the so-called imperial crisis, Alföldi once again approached his research on the basis of numismatic sources. He reviewed great collections of material from this time. His investigation of the Siscia mintmark proved particularly important. Based on the coins he studied, Alföldi a worked out a new chronology of this period in Roman history. Among his new findings was that during the period of soldier-emperors, many Pannonians held some of the highest positions in the empire. In addition, he presented Gallienus as a great Roman emperor, which was different point of view from that hitherto presented by historical research.

=== Late Antiquity ===
Alföldi also made noteworthy contributions to the study of late antiquity and here again he made particular use of numismatic sources. Of particular importance was the cataloging of the so-called Contorniate coins, which opened up a new, hitherto almost unknown source, especially for the history of ideas of the late 4th and early 5th centuries. The coins had been almost totally misunderstood before his work. This research took place during the second World War, which makes the achievement particularly noteworthy. Despite the turmoil of war Alföldi was able to obtain the materials he needed from the different museums of Europe.

What most interested Alföldi in the study of late antiquity, however, was the era between Constantine I and the victory of Christianity over paganism. His work “A Festival of Isis in Rome under the Christian Emperors of the IVth Century” (Budapest 1937), in which he writes about a festival honoring the goddess Isis in Rome at the time of Christian emperors of the 4th century, is considered outstanding. Also his annual organization of an international colloquium to the Historia Augusta, which was held on a regular basis for 20 years, contributed greatly to the study of late antiquity.

== Legacy and recognition ==
Probably the most important contribution that Alföldi made to the study of ancient history was the realization that epigraphic, numismatic, and archaeological sources are equal and complementary, and that literary sources should not just be treated as an auxiliary scholarly pursuit. As an opponent of excessive specialization in a field that increasingly broke down into specialist divisions, he himself was a specialist in many areas. In a historical perspective, he stood in the tradition of Mommsen, but in a methodological perspective he followed the tradition of Michael Rostovtzeff, who based his economic-historical studies on archaeological sources.

Alföldi's use of numismatic sources was also a major contribution. Ancient coins were, thanks to him, one of the main sources of ancient history. His methods, which included the study of series of coins, as well as the analysis of mintmarks and the use of coins as a source for religious studies interpretations were groundbreaking. Just as Mommsen is regarded as the great organizer in the study of Roman inscriptions, Alföldi is thought of as the doyen of numismatics. "He had a big role in ensuring that the Numismatics has become a historical science." (Géza Alföldy). Alföldi's contributions to the exploration of the Danube and Carpathian regions are also noteworthy. Through his efforts, this area which was once almost a blank spot on the "map" of the ancient world became one of its most well researched areas.

Alföldi's œuvre includes more than 300 articles, including about a dozen in the form of monographs.

In addition to his better-known research, Alföldi also pursued other studies. He wrote about the art of photographing of Greek vase paintings, the psychological foundations of witchcraft and the importance of the theriomorphic worldview among the peoples of North Asia.

In 1972, Alföldi was awarded the Order Pour le Mérite for Arts and Sciences. The only other historian to receive this honor was Sir Ronald Syme. In addition, he was a member or honorary member of many scientific societies and academies. He also held honorary doctorates from several universities and earned other awards . The Historic Class of the Bavarian Academy of Sciences took accepted him as a corresponding member in 1936. In 1975 he was awarded the Austrian Decoration for Science and Art.

== Publications ==
- Alföldi, Andreas (1934). "Eine spätrömische Helmform und ihre Schicksale im Germanisch-Romanischen Mittelalter". Acta Archaeologica. V: 99–144. ISSN 0065-101X.
