= Nepotianus (disambiguation) =

Nepotianus was a Roman usurper of the 4th century.

Nepotianus may also refer to:

- Nepotianus (magister militiae), Roman general of the 5th century
- Nepotian of Asturias, Asturian king of the 9th century
