= Battle of Campi Cannini =

456 battle

Date	457 AD
Location	Near Lake Maggiore, Italy
Result	Roman victory

Belligerents
Alemanni	Western Roman Empire

Commanders and leaders
Unknown	Burco

Strength
900 soldiers	Unknown

Casualties and losses
Heavy: Around the entire force	Light

The Battle of Campi Canini was fought between the Alemanni and the Western Roman Empire in 457. Taking advantage of the confusion after the defeat of Emperor Avitus at Placentia on 16 October 456, an Alemannic army crossed the Rhaetian Alps through Switzerland into Italy, reaching Lake Maggiore. At nearby Campi Cannini, the Alemanni were defeated by the Roman officer Burco, in the name of the usurper Majorian.

== Aftermath ==
From there on, Majorian would be able to consolidate his control over Rome after deposing Avitus, establishing Ricimer as his right-hand man until his execution in 461.

== Sources ==
- Jaques, Tony (2007). Dictionary of Battles and Sieges: A–E. Greenwood Publishing Group. ISBN 978-0313335372.
