= Battle of Arelate =

458 battle in southern France

- Part of: Fall of the Roman Empire; Gothic War of 457–458; Roman–Germanic Wars
Date	Late 458
Location	Arelate, Gallia Viennensis II (modern-day Arles, France) 43.677°N 4.628°E
Result	Roman victory

Belligerents
Western Roman Empire	Visigothic Kingdom

Commanders and leaders
Majorian; Aegidius; Nepotianus	Theodoric II

The Battle of Arles was fought in 458 near Arelate (Arles) between Western Roman Emperor Majorian and Visigothic king Theodoric II. After the assassination of Flavius Aetius in 454, the Visigoths began to expand their kingdom at the expense of the crumbling Roman administration in Gaul and Hispania. When Majorian became emperor in 457, the Visigoths under king Theodoric II had just recently defeated the Suebic Kingdom in north-west Hispania and were consolidating their hold on the rest of the Iberian Peninsula.

Majorian, a young, capable general in his late thirties, inherited a collapsing empire consisting of only Italy, Dalmatia, and some fractured territories in northern Gaul. He decided the first step towards consolidating the empire would be to confront the Visigoths in Septimania. Traveling with his generals Aegidius and Nepotianus, Majorian encountered the Visigothic king and his army at Arelate, at the mouth of the Rhodanus River (Rhone). The ensuing battle was an overwhelming Gothic defeat. Theodoric II was forced to flee Arelate, abandon Septimania, and conclude a hasty peace treaty. The treaty returned all Visigothic territory in Hispania to the Romans, and the Visigoths were reduced to federate status.

The battle allowed Majorian to campaign deeper in Gaul against the Burgundian Kingdom, and later in Hispania against the Suebic Kingdom.
