= Heraclius of Edessa =

Eastern Roman General

Heraclius of Edessa (Ancient Greek: Ἡράκλειος, romanized: Hērákleios, died 474) was an Eastern Roman Empire general who took part in the failed campaign against the Vandals in 468.

== Biography ==
Heraclius was born in Edessa, Mesopotamia, according to Theophanes the Confessor. John of Antioch and Theophanes both identify him as a son of Florus.

Before 468, Heraclius was probably the comes rei militaris of the Eastern court. He was sent with troops to support the Lazi against the Sassanids and the Iberians, but his allies failed to adequately supply his troops, forcing him to withdraw.

In 468, he was sent from Constantinople to Egypt, where he gathered troops for a massive campaign against the Vandals in Africa. The overall plan called for a three-pronged attack led by commander in chief Basiliscus, Marcellinus, and Heraclius. Basiliscus, the brother-in-law of Leo I the Thracian, was to land at a distance from Carthage with the main army, transported by an armada of over 1,000 ships, and link up with Heraclius, advancing from Tripolitania. Marcellinus was to secure Sicily and Sardinia.

Heraclius landed in Tripolitania and defeated the Vandal forces. He occupied the local cities and continued overland to Carthage. However, the rest of the plan failed. Geiseric, King of the Vandals, called for negotiations with Basiliscus. Basiliscus agreed, unaware that Geiseric was actually preparing a surprise attack. The Vandal monarch sent fire ships against Basiliscus' fleet, destroying most of his ships. The rest retreated. Marcellinus achieved his main goal of securing the two islands for the Western Roman Empire, but was assassinated in Sicily, probably at the instigation of his political rival, Ricimer. Heraclius, left to stand alone against the Vandals, returned to Constantinople.

In 471, Heraclius helped Emperor Leo I to get rid of the influential barbarian magister militum Aspar. In 474, during the reign of Zeno, Heraclius had reached the position of magister militum per Thracias. In that capacity, he faced the Goths of Theodoric Strabo, but was captured in Thrace. He was later freed when the emperor paid a ransom.

According to Malchus, Zeno sent him home, but along the way, at Arcadiopolis, he was murdered by some soldiers for the cruelties he had committed during his tenure. John of Antioch, however, mentions him being killed by Strabo in the Chersonese.

Malchus criticizes Heraclius as hasty and impetuous, lacking foresight and prudence. Theophanes praises him as an energetic general. There are surviving fragments of a panegyric honouring a military commander called Heraclius, more likely than not, Heraclius of Edessa.

== Possible descendants ==
Cyril Mango has supported a theory which suggests that Heraclius of Edessa was a namesake ancestor of Heraclius the Elder and through him of the Heraclian Dynasty. There seems to be no primary source confirming the connection.

== Bibliography ==
=== Primary sources ===
- Priscus, History, fragment 41
- Procopius, Vandal War, xvi.9, xvi.25.
- Theophanes the Confessor, Chronicle, AM 5963
- Malchus, History, fragments 4 e 5
- John of Antioch, Historia chronike, fragment 210

=== Secondary sources ===
- Gerard Friell; Stephen Williams, The Rome That Did Not Fall, Routledge, 1998. ISBN 0-415-15403-0, p. 179
- Hussey, Joan Mervyn (1967), The Cambridge medieval history, Cambridge University Press
- Kaegi, Walter Emil (2003), Heraclius: emperor of Byzantium, Cambridge University Press, ISBN 0-521-81459-6
- Martindale, John R., ed. (1980). The Prosopography of the Later Roman Empire: Volume II, AD 395–527. Cambridge: Cambridge University Press. ISBN 0-521-20159-4.
