= Sunieric =

Visigoth general

Sunieric (Latin: Suniericus; fl 459–461) was a Visigoth general, who collaborated with the Roman army in the re-conquest of Spain on behalf of Emperor Majorian.

== Life ==
Cyrila's successor, Sunieric was sent by king Theodoric II to Hispania Baetica, in 459, with a Visigothic army. Elevated to the rank of comes rei militaris in the same year, together with general Nepotianus, comes et magister utriusque militiae of Emperor Majorian, he sent messengers in Gallaecia to inform about the alliance between the Visigoths and the Empire. In the wake of this alliance, Sunieric and Nepotianus led a Visigoth army in 460 against Suebi, whom they defeated near Lucus Augusti, ravaging the neighbourhood and finally moved to the Lusitania, conquering the city of Scallabis.

In 461 he returned to Gaul.

== Bibliography ==
- Martindale, John R.; Jones, A. H. M.; Morris, John, eds. (1971). "Suniericus". The Prosopography of the Later Roman Empire: Volume I, AD 260–395. Cambridge: Cambridge University Press. p. 1040. ISBN 0-521-07233-6.
