= Scalabis =

Coordinates: 39.235105°N 8.676233°W

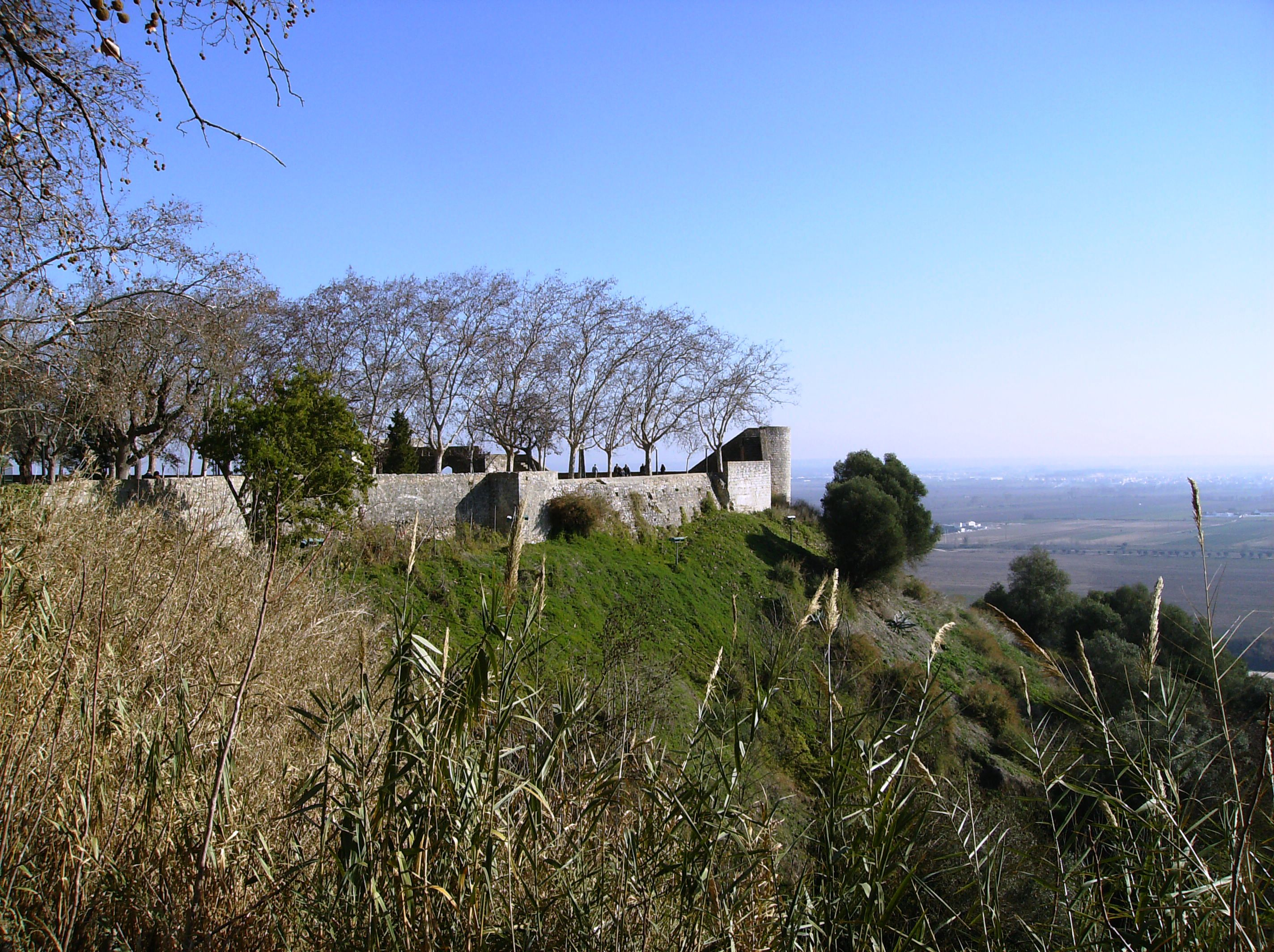
Santarem Castle hill, original fortified area of Scallabi Castrum

Administrative organization of Hispania in 17BC by emperor Augustus.

Scallabis (also Scallabi Castrum, Præsidium Iulium, Scallabis Praesidium Iulium or Colonia Scallabis Iulia) was the Roman name of Santarém, Portugal.

== History ==
The first documented human occupation dates from the 8th century BC. There is also evidence of trade with the Phoenicians, due to its location as a commercial outpost on the Tagus river.

The Romans arrived at this region in 138 BC and settled in the city, then going by the name of Scallabis, and limited to the fortified area currently known as Alcáçova de Santarém.

A latter designation was "Scallabis Praesidium Iulium", given by Julius Caesar in 61 BC, with the installation of a military camp next to the previous fortifications. Most of the citizens were then inscribed in the Sergian Roman gens.

The city became one of the most important administrative centers of the Lusitania province in the 1st century AD, as head of a Conventus iuridicus, the Conventus Scallabitanus that included cities such as Olisipo, Seilium and Conímbriga. It was connected by important roads to Olisipo, Bracara Augusta and was the location of a Tagus river crossing.

In 460 Scallabis was conquered by Sunieric (along with Nepotianus and Theodoric II) as part of a campaign against the Suebi. Roman domain ended, with the city becoming part of the Visigoth kingdom.

With the Alan and Vandal invasions, the city became known as "Sancta Irene", the root of the current name "Santarém".

== Archeology ==
Archaeological work in the Alcáçova de Santarém area has identified a Roman temple with a podium of about 15 by 15 meters, and part of the cella, dating from the 1st century BC (probably a Capitolium). A theatre and baths from that period were also identified.
