= Battle of Garigliano (457) =

457 battle during the Germanic Wars

Date	457
Location	Campania, Italy
Result	Roman victory

Belligerents
Vandals	Western Roman Empire

Commanders and leaders
Unknown	Majorian

Strength
Unknown	Unknown

Casualties and losses
Unknown	Unknown

The Battle of Garigliano was fought between the Vandals and the Western Roman Empire in Campania, Italy in 457. After having seized Carthage and made it the capital of their kingdom in 439, the Vandals frequently raided the territories of the Western Roman Empire. In 457, the new emperor Majorian surprised a Vandal-Berber raiding party which was returning with loot from Campania. They were engaged at the mouth of the river Garigliano. Many of the raiders were slaughtered before they could reach their ships or were driven into the sea and drowned.

== Sources ==
- Jaques, Tony (2007). Dictionary of Battles and Sieges: F-O. Greenwood Publishing Group. ISBN 978-0313335389.
