= Contorniate =

Ancient Roman medallion

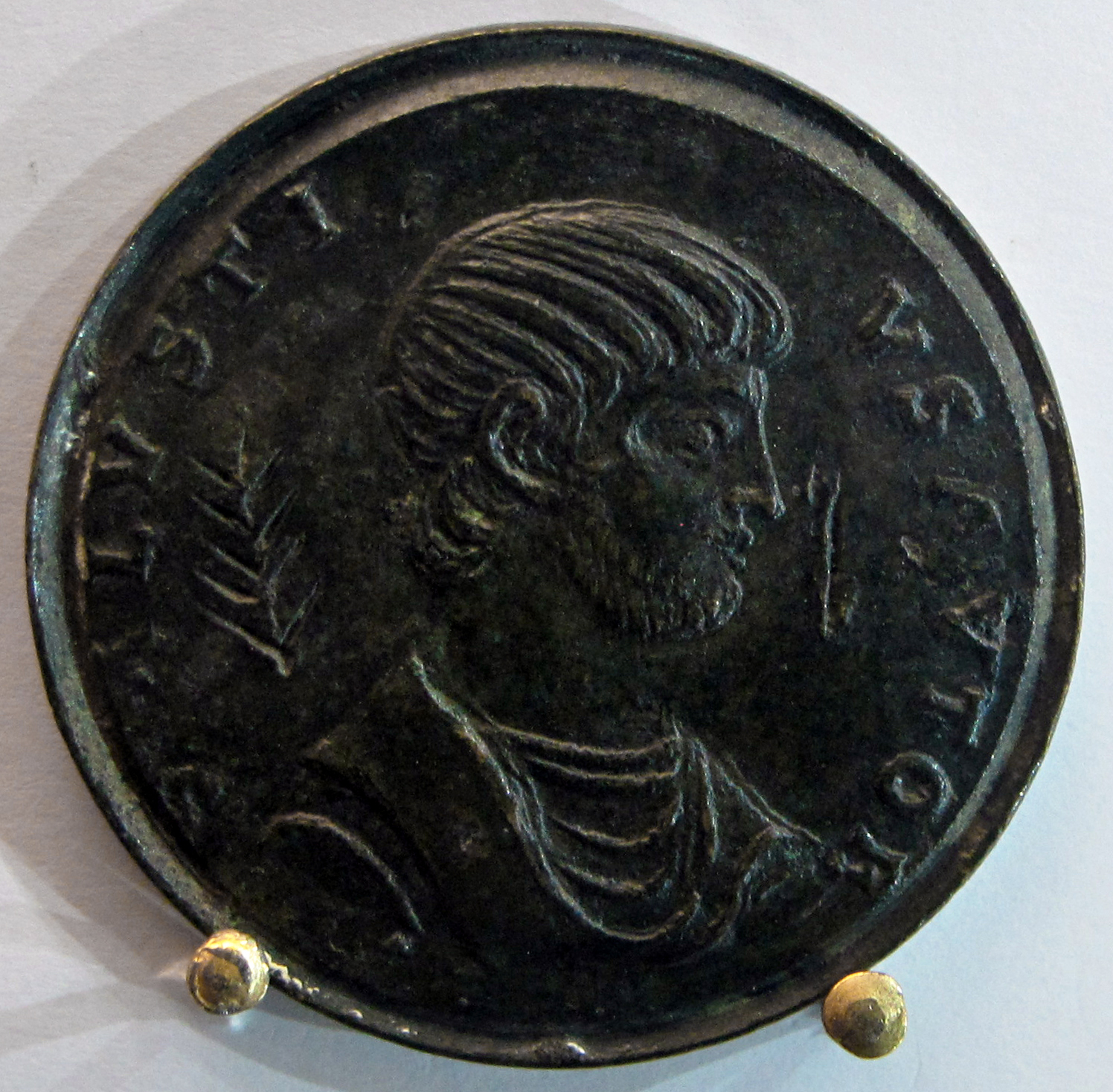
Contorniate of Sallust

A contorniate, or contourniate (UK pronunciation: /kənˈtɔːnɪət/), is a type of ancient Roman medal or medallion of bronze issued in the fourth and fifth centuries CE, having a deep furrow on the contour or edge, as if the object had been turned in a lathe. The extant contorniates show portraits of various earlier emperors (especially Nero, Trajan and Majorian) or of cultural figures such as Homer, Solon, Euclid, Pythagoras, Socrates, Sallust, Apollonius Tyaneus, and Apuleius, as well as athletes, whose victories are symbolized by palm leaves and chariots, either bigae or quadrigae. The medals were not used as currency, but may have been distributed as New Year's gifts in association with public spectacles, including chariot races and pantomime.

The standard catalog of these medals is by Andreas and Elisabeth Alföldi, Kontorniat-Medaillons (Berlin, 1976), ISBN 3110034840 (v. 1) and 3110119056 (v.2).
