= Majorian =

Western Roman emperor from 457 to 461

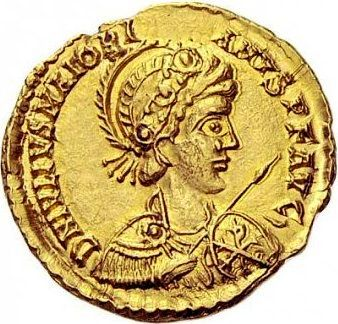
- Solidus of Majorian, marked: d·n· iulius maiorianus p·f· aug·

Roman emperor
- Reign: 28 December 457 – 2 August 461
- Predecessor: Avitus
- Successor: Libius Severus
- Eastern emperor: Leo I
- Born: c. November 420; Roman Gaul
- Died: 7 August 461; Dertona, Western Roman Empire
Names
- Iulius Valerius Maiorianus
- Mother: Daughter of Majorianus, magister militum
- Religion: Chalcedonian Christianity

Majorian (Latin: Iulius Valerius Maiorianus; c. 420 – 7 August 461) was Western Roman emperor from 457 to 461. A prominent commander in the Western military, Majorian deposed Avitus in 457 with the aid of his ally Ricimer at the Battle of Placentia. Possessing little more than Italy and Dalmatia, as well as some territory in Hispania and northern Gaul, Majorian campaigned vigorously for three years against the Empire's enemies. In 461, he was murdered at Dertona in a conspiracy, and his successors until the fall of the Empire in 476 were puppets either of barbarian generals or the Eastern Roman court.

After defeating a Vandal attack on Italy in 457, Majorian intercepted the Visigoths in the Battle of Arelate, defeating them and saving the city. Securing Septimania, he reduced the Goths to federate status, returning Hispania to the empire. Meanwhile, Marcellinus was convinced to recognise Majorian, reconquering Sicily in the emperor's name. Majorian then attacked the Burgundians, reconquering Lugdunum and expelling them from the Rhône valley. Marching into Gaul, he reintegrated the Gallo-Romans and appointed Aegidius commander of the region, while Nepotianus invaded the Kingdom of the Suebi and reconquered Scalabis. In 460, Majorian entered Hispania and readied a fleet for an invasion of Africa. However, the Vandals bribed traitors into defection and destroyed the fleet in the Battle of Cartagena, forcing Majorian to return to Italy.

During his reign, Majorian instituted reforms to reduce corruption, rebuild the state's institutions and preserve ancient monuments. This led to an antagonistic relationship with the Roman Senate, which was exploited by Ricimer to behead Majorian upon his arrival in Italy in 461. The 6th-century writer Procopius asserted that Majorian "surpassed in every virtue all who have ever been emperors of the Romans", while Sidonius Apollinaris, a contemporary of the emperor, stated, "That he was gentle to his subjects; that he was terrible to his enemies; and that he excelled in every virtue, all his predecessors who had reigned over the Romans."

== Early life ==
The life of Majorian and his reign are better known than those of the other Western Emperors of the same period. The most important sources are the chronicles that cover the second half of the 5th century—those of Hydatius and Marcellinus Comes, as well as the fragments of Priscus and John of Antioch.

Besides these sources, which are useful also for the biographies of the other emperors, some peculiar sources are available that make Majorian's life known in some detail, both before and after his rise to the throne. The Gallo-Roman aristocrat and poet Sidonius Apollinaris was an acquaintance of the Emperor and composed a panegyric that is the major source for Majorian's life up to 459. As regards his policy, twelve of his laws have been preserved: the so-called Novellae Maioriani were included in the Breviary of Alaric, compiled for Alaric II in 506, which helps to understand the problems that pressed Majorian's government.

Majorian was probably born after 420, as in 458 he was described as a iuvenis ('young man'). He belonged to the military aristocracy of the Roman Empire. His grandfather of the same name reached the rank of magister militum under Emperor Theodosius I and, as commander-in-chief of the Illyrian army, was present at his coronation at Sirmium in 379. The magister militum's daughter then married an officer, probably called Domninus, who administered the finances of Aetius, the most powerful general of the West. The couple gave the name Maiorianus to their child in honour of his influential grandfather, as was the custom for the firstborn son.

It was under the same Aetius that Majorian started his military career. He followed Aetius to Gallia, where he met two officers also under Aetius's command who were to play an important role in Majorian's life: the Suebic-Visigoth Ricimer and the Gallo-Roman Aegidius. Majorian distinguished himself in the defence of the city of Turonensis (modern Tours) and in a battle near Vicus Helena (447 or 448) against the Franks under Chlodio. In the latter, Majorian fought at the head of his cavalry on a bridge, while Aetius controlled the roads leading to the battlefield:

There was a narrow passage at the junction of two ways, and a road crossed both the village of Helena ... and the river. [Aëtius] was posted at the cross-roads while Majorian warred as a mounted man close to the bridge itself ...

— Sidonius Apollinaris, Carmina, V.207–227. Anderson tr.

Placidia was the younger daughter of Emperor Valentinian III, who planned to marry her to Majorian (450 ca.). As the powerful magister militum Aetius realised that this marriage would weaken his position, he sent Majorian away from his staff to private life, thus hindering the marriage.

Around 450, the Western Roman Emperor Valentinian III considered the possibility of marrying his daughter Placidia to Majorian. Valentinian had two daughters but no sons, and therefore no heir to the throne. Having Majorian as son-in-law would have strengthened Valentinian in the face of other powerful generals and would have solved the problem of the succession. Furthermore, as Emperor, Majorian could have led the army himself, freed from the dangerous bond with a powerful general, such as Valentinian had been obliged to contract with Aetius.

The intention of this plan was to avoid the possibility that barbarian generals like Huneric or Attila should succeed to Aetius, but clashed with the plans of Aetius himself. The Roman general, in fact, planned to marry his own son Gaudentius to Placidia. He therefore opposed Valentinian's plan, and put an end to Majorian's military career, expelling him from his staff and sending him to his country estate. According to the poet Sidonius Apollinaris, the cause of the fall of Majorian was the jealousy of Aetius's wife, who feared that Majorian could overshadow Aetius's prestige.

It was only in 454 that Majorian was able to return to public life. In that year, Valentinian III killed Aetius with his own hands. Fearing that Aetius's troops might revolt, he called Majorian back to office to quell any dissent. In the following year, Valentinian III was killed by two former officers of Aetius's staff. There was then a fight for the succession, as no heir existed. Majorian played the role of the candidate for the throne of Licinia Eudoxia, Valentinian's widow, and of Ricimer, who reserved for himself a role similar to Aetius's.

In the end, the new emperor was Petronius Maximus, a senator involved in Valentinian's murder, who outmanoeuvred the other candidates. To strengthen his position, he obliged Licinia to marry him and promoted Majorian to the rank of comes domesticorum (commander-in-chief of the imperial guard).

== Rise to the throne ==
=== The revolt against Avitus ===
Petronius ruled only for a few weeks, as he was killed during the Vandal sack of Rome (May 455). He was succeeded, not by Majorian, but by the Gallo-Roman noble Avitus, who had the support of the Visigoths. Both Majorian, comes domesticorum, and Ricimer, comes rei militaris of Italy, initially supported Avitus, but when the Emperor lost the loyalty of the Italian aristocracy, the two generals revolted against him. First Majorian and Ricimer killed Remistus, the magister militum entrusted by Avitus with the defence of the capital, Ravenna. Then Ricimer defeated Avitus's troops near Placentia, taking the Emperor himself prisoner, and obliging him to abdicate. Finally, Majorian caused Avitus's death, possibly starving him, in early 457.

=== Emperor of the West ===
The Eastern Roman Emperor Marcian, who by tradition would have chosen a new Western colleague, died on 27 January 457, and his successor Leo I initially preferred to rule alone. On 28 February, Majorian became magister militum, while Ricimer became patricius and magister militum. This was more likely an act of usurpation rather than an appointment made by Leo.

While the situation was in a precarious equilibrium, a troop of 900 Alemanni invaded Italy. They entered from Raetia and penetrated Italian territory down to Lake Maggiore. There they were intercepted and defeated in the Battle of Campi Cannini by the troops of comes Burco, sent by Majorian to stop them:

The savage Alaman had scaled the Alps and had emerged, plundering the Roman land; he had sent 900 foemen to scour for booty ... By this time you were Master [of Soldiers], and you sent forth Burco with a band of followers ... Fortune brought about a triumph not through numbers but through their love of you ... You fought with the authority of a Master but the destiny of an Emperor

— Sidonius Apollinaris, Carmina, V.373–385. Anderson tr.

This victory was celebrated as Majorian's own, and the magister militum was acclaimed Emperor by the army (perhaps on 1 April), six miles outside Ravenna, at a place called ad Columellas, "at the Little Columns". (Note: The date 1 April 457 is probably a mistake in the Fasti vindobonenses for the official proclamation of the eastern emperor Leo in the west (1 April 458).)

In his panegyric to Majorian, the poet Sidonius Apollinaris tells that Majorian initially refused the election:

The world trembled with alarm while you were loath to permit your victories to benefit you, and because, overly modest, you grieved because you deserved the throne and because you would not undertake to rule what you had deemed worth defending

— Sidonius Apollinaris, Carmina, V.9–12. Anderson tr.

Majorian was formally declared emperor on 28 December. In 458 he claimed the consulship, a customary office for emperors in their first full year of power. His claim was apparently never acknowledged by the Eastern Empire, where almost all contemporary sources refer to Leo I as sole consul.

== Foreign affairs ==
=== Defence of Italy ===
In summer 457, a group of Vandals, led by the brother-in-law of Genseric, landed in Campania, at the mouth of the Liri river, and started devastating and sacking the region. Majorian personally led the Roman army to a victory over the invaders near Sinuessa and followed the defeated Vandals, loaded with their booty, as far as their own ships, killing many of them including their commander.

After this event, Majorian understood that he had to take the initiative if he wanted to defend the heart of his Empire, the only territory he actually controlled. So he decided to strengthen its defences. First, he issued a law, the Novella Maioriani 8 known as De reddito iure armorum ("On the Return of the Right to Bear Arms"), concerning the personal right to bear arms; in 440, Valentinian III had already promulgated a law with the same name, Novella Valentiniani 9, after another attack of the Vandals. It is probably to this time that another law is to be dated, the Novella Maioriani 12 known as De aurigis et seditiosis ("Concerning Charioteers and Seditious Persons"), to quell the disorders that sprang up during the chariot races. Both these laws are now lost.

He then strengthened the army, recruiting a large number of barbarian mercenaries, including Gepids, Ostrogoths, Rugii, Burgundians, Huns, Bastarnae, Suebi, Scythians and Alans. Finally, he rebuilt two fleets, probably those of Miseno and Ravenna, since the Vandals had a strong navy:

Meanwhile you built on the two shores fleets for the upper and lower sea. Down into the water falls every forest of the Apennines

— Sidonius Apollinaris, Carmina, V.441–442. Anderson tr.

=== Reconquest of Gaul ===
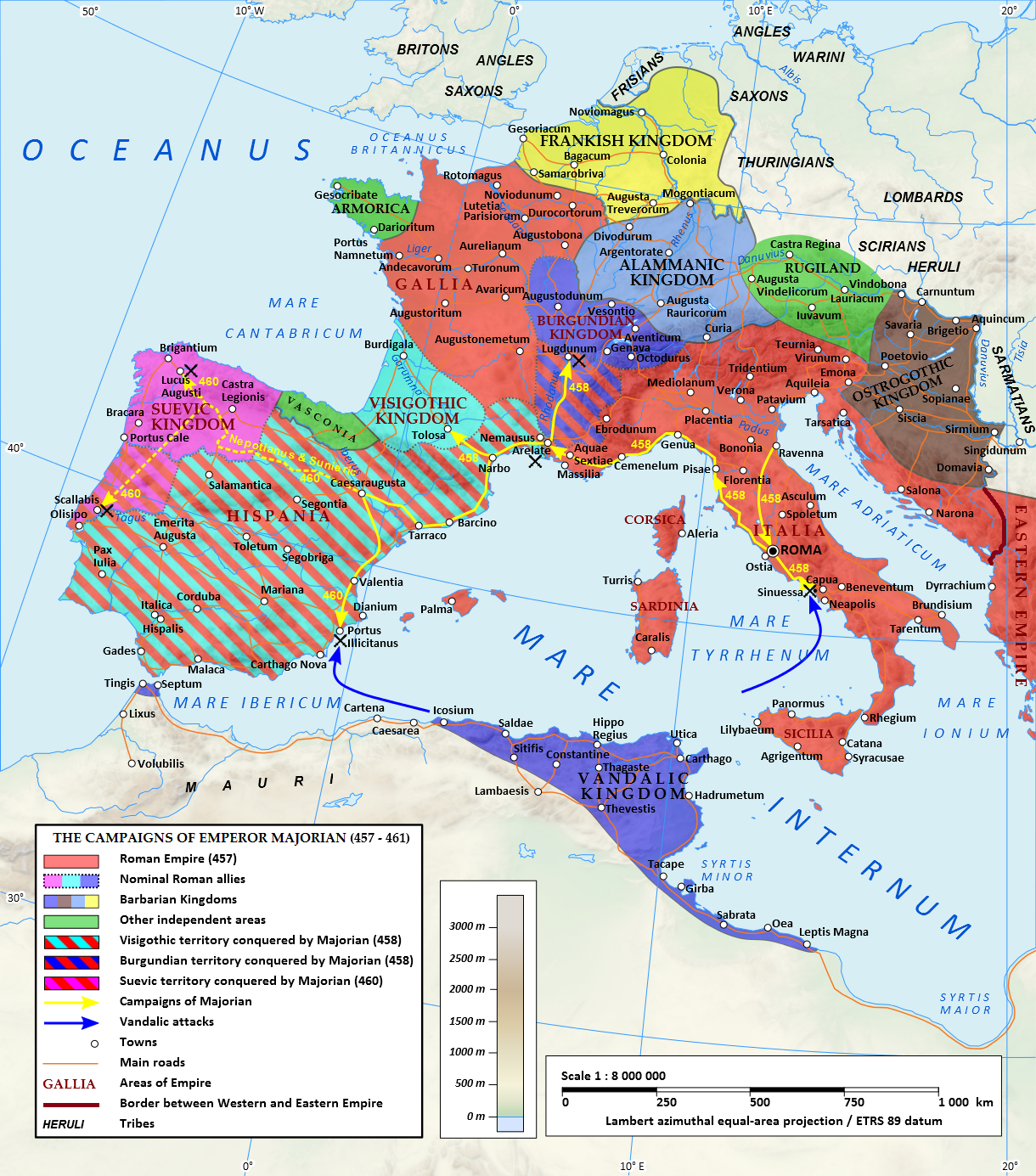
During his four-year reign Majorian reconquered most of Hispania and southern Gaul, meanwhile reducing the Visigoths, Burgundians and Suevi to federate status.

After consolidating his position in Italy, Majorian concentrated on the recovery of Gaul. When news of the deposition of the Gallo-Roman emperor Avitus arrived in Gaul, the province refused to recognize Majorian as his successor. An important clue to this is an inscription found in Lugdunum (modern Lyons) and dating to 458; according to Roman custom, the inscriptions were dated by writing the names of the consuls in office, who that year were supposed to be Leo I and Majorian. This inscription, instead, records only the name of Eastern Emperor Leo I, showing that Majorian was not recognized at the time as the lawful Western Emperor.

Another clue is the fact that, at the death of Avitus, the citizens of Lugdunum sent an envoy to Leo, and not to Majorian, to ask for a reduction of taxation. Finally, there is a record of a failed usurpation in Gaul, around this time.

In late 458, Majorian entered Gaul, with an army strengthened by barbarian units. The Emperor personally led the army, leaving Ricimer in Italy and choosing Aegidius and the magister militum Nepotianus as collaborators. The imperial army defeated the Visigoths under king Theodoric II at the Battle of Arelate, forcing the Visigoths to abandon Septimania and withdraw west to Aquitania. The Roman victory was decisive: under the new treaty the Visigoths had to relinquish their vast conquests in Hispania and return to federate status. Majorian chose his trusted general Aegidius as the new magister militum per Gallias (military commander of Gaul) and sent an envoy to Hispania, to report the victory over the Visigoths and the new treaty with Theodoric II.

With the help of his new foederati, Majorian entered the Rhone Valley, conquering its populations "some by arms and some by diplomacy". He defeated the Burgundians and besieged and conquered the city of Lugdunum: the rebel city was heavily fined, while the Bagaudae were forced to join the Empire. Despite the fact that the Gallo-Roman aristocracy had sided with Avitus, Majorian wanted a reconciliation, not a punishment. With the intercession of Majorian's magister epistolarum Petrus, Sidonius Apollinaris, the son-in-law of Avitus, was allowed to deliver a panegyric in honour of the Emperor (early January 459), receiving in reward the appointment to the rank of comes spectabilis. Much more effective was, however, the granting of the tax remission that the citizens of Lugdunum had requested from Leo I.

=== Campaign in Hispania ===
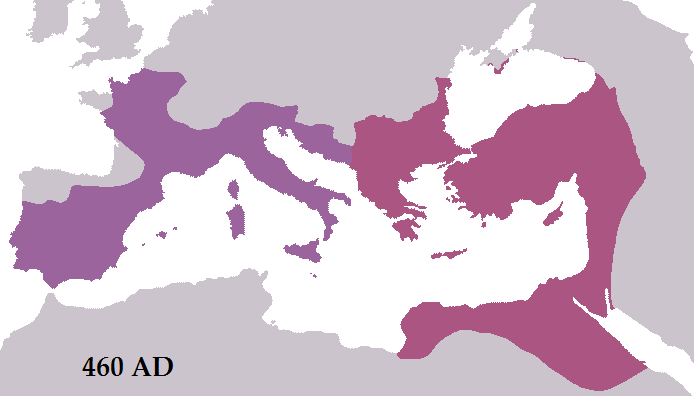
The Roman Empire in 460 during the reign of Majorian.

In the wake of the Vandal sack of Rome (455), the Visigoths had conquered Hispania, formally in the name of the new Western Emperor Avitus, actually controlling the territory themselves. Majorian planned to reconquer Hispania and use it as the base for the conquest of Africa. This rich province of the Western Empire, which provided for the very important grain supply to the city of Rome, was in fact under Vandal control.

According to the historian Procopius, Majorian, "who surpassed in every virtue all who ever were emperors of the Romans", wanted to know personally the military readiness of the Vandals and how the local populations would react to the Roman invasion. He dyed black his fair hair, for which he was famous, and went to Genseric claiming to be an envoy of the Western Emperor. Genseric tried to impress the enemy ambassador by showing him the arms collected in the warehouses and sent him back. This story is probably only a legend of Italian folklore, but it is a clue to the care with which the expedition was prepared. Majorian collected information on the enemy and gathered a fleet of three hundred ships to support the army in the reconquest of Hispania and in the invasion of Africa.

It was probably during the preparation of this operation that Majorian sent the comes and patricius Occidentis Marcellinus to Sicily with an army of Huns, to take the island back from the Vandals. Marcellinus was the comes rei militaris (governor) of Illyricum, but he had become practically independent since the death of Aetius, not recognizing the imperial authority. Majorian convinced him to accept him as Emperor and even to collaborate with his troops in the military recovery of the Empire.

The campaign started with an operation against the Suebi in North-Western Hispania, lasting the whole of 459, led by the magister militiae Nepotianus and the Gothic comes Sunieric. Majorian gathered the main part of the army in Liguria, then entered Aquitaine and Novempopulania coming from Theodoric's court in Toulouse (May 460). Genseric, fearing the Roman invasion, tried to negotiate a peace with Majorian, who rejected the proposal, since the economic investment he had done to prepare the campaign had been enormous. The Vandal king then decided to devastate Mauretania and Numidia, his own territory, by poisoning the water sources and burning the fields, because he thought that the Roman army would land there, and also ordered his navy to prepare incursions in the waters near the probable invasion area.

In the meantime, Majorian was conquering Hispania. While Nepotianus and Sunieric defeated the Suebi at Lucus Augusti (modern Lugo) and conquered Scallabis in Lusitania (modern Santarém, Portugal), the Emperor passed through Caesaraugusta (Zaragoza), where he performed a formal imperial adventus. Finally he reached Carthaginiensis, where his fleet, docked at Portus Illicitanus (near Elche), was destroyed by traitors paid by the Vandals:

While Majorian was campaigning in the province of Carthaginiensis the Vandals destroyed, through traitors, several ships that he was preparing for himself for a crossing against the Vandals from the shore of Carthaginiensis. Majorian, frustrated in this manner from his intention, returned to Italy.

— Hydatius, Chronicle, 200, s.a. 460.

In autumn 460 Majorian, deprived of the fleet that was necessary for the invasion, cancelled the attack on the Vandals and received the ambassadors of Gaiseric, with whom he agreed to conclude peace, which probably included the recognition of the de facto occupation of Mauretania by the Vandals. He disbanded his costly troops, and moved to Arelate to spend the winter, while he expected to be welcome with dissent in Italy.

== Domestic policy ==
Majorian's domestic policy is known thanks to some of the laws he issued, the so-called Novellae Maioriani, that were included in a collection of Roman law called the Breviary of Alaric, requested from some Gallo-Roman jurists in 506 by the Visigothic king Alaric II .

The preserved laws are:

- Novella Maioriani 1, De ortu imperii domini Majoriani Augusti, "The Beginning of the Reign of Our Lord Majorian Augustus", opening speech of his reign, addressed to the Roman Senate (given in Ravenna, on 11 January 458);
- Novella Maioriani 2, De indulgentiis reliquorum, "On the Remission of Past-Due Accounts" (given in Ravenna, on 11 March 458, to Basilius, Praetorian prefect of Italy);
- Novella Maioriani 3, De defensoribus civitatum, "The Defenders of the Municipalities", on the office of defensor civitatum (given in Ravenna, on 8 May 458, also in the name of Leo I);
- Novella Maioriani 4, De aedificiis pubblicis, "Public Buildings", on the preservation of the monuments of Rome (given in Ravenna, on 11 July 458, to Aemilianus, praefectus urbi of Rome, also in the name of Leo I);
- Novella Maioriani 5, De bonis caducis sive proscriptorum, "On Abandoned Property and That of Proscribed Persons" (given in Ravenna, on 4 September 458, to Ennodius, comes privatae largitionis, also in the name of Leo I);
- Novella Maioriani 6, De sanctimonialibus vel viduis et de successionibus earum, "Holy Maidens, Widows, and Their Succession" (given in Ravenna, on 26 October 458, to Basilius, Praetorian prefect of Italy, also in the name of Leo I);
- Novella Maioriani 7, De curialibus et de agnatione vel distractione praediorum et de ceteris negotiis, "Curiales, Their Children and The Sale of Their Landed Estates" (given in Ravenna, on 6 November 458, to Basilius, Praetorian prefect of Italy, also in the name of Leo I);
- Novella Maioriani 8, De reddito iure armorum, "On the Return of the Right to Bear Arms", whose text is lost;
- Novella Maioriani 9, De adulteriis, "Adultery", confirming that the adulterers are to be put to death (given in Arelate, on 17 April 459, to Rogatianus, governor of Suburbicarian Tuscany, also in the name of Leo I);
- Novella Maioriani 10, about the right of the Roman senators and of the Church to keep the goods received in a will, whose text is lost;
- Novella Maioriani 11, De episcopali iudicio et ne quis invitus clericus ordinetur vel de ceteris negotiis, "Episcopal Courts; No Person Shall Be Ordained A Cleric Against His Will; Various Matters", (given in Arelate, on 28 March 460, to Ricimer, also in the name of Leo I);
- Novella Maioriani 12, De aurigis et seditiosis, "Charioteers and Seditious Persons", whose text is lost.

=== Fiscal policy and coinage ===
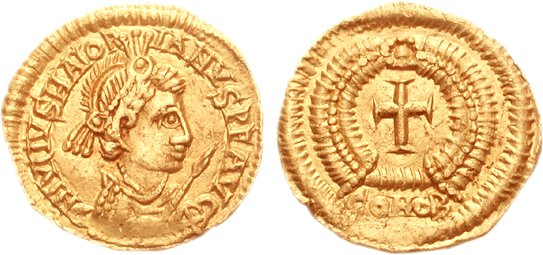
Tremissis minted by a Visigothic king in the name of Majorian. These coins were minted in Arelate between 457 and 507 and showed the corrupted name iviivs haiorianvs. Even if their style was close to the Roman originals, Visigothic coins contained less precious metal; it was probably for this reason that Majorian issued a law obliging the tax collectors to accept golden coins at their nominal value, with the exception of the "Gallic" coin, of lesser value.

Majorian understood that he could reign effectively only with the support of the senatorial aristocracy, whom he wanted to return to its pristine political prominence. At the same time, he planned to reduce the abuses perpetrated by the senators, many of whom cultivated their local interests disregarding the imperial policies, even refusing to pay taxes and keeping for themselves the taxes they had exacted. This fiscal evasion had a cascade effect that affected the small landowners, the citizens and the local civil magistrates.

For example, the decurions had to personally compensate the imperial treasury for all taxes not exacted. Sometimes, oppressed by the debts accumulated in this way, the decurions abandoned their status, a problem which was previously addressed by Emperor Julian (361–363). Majorian also cancelled tax arrears, knowing that fiscal policy could not be effective if taxpayers had to pay large accumulated arrears.

On 11 March 458, Majorian issued a law entitled De indulgentiis reliquorum, "On the Remission of Past-Due Accounts" (Novella Maioriani 2). This law remitted all the tax arrears of the landowners. This same law explicitly prohibited public administrators, who had a record of keeping the collected money for themselves, from collecting taxes. This task was to be reserved to the governors alone. Another law issued to reorganise the tax system was issued on 4 September of the same year, and was entitled De bonis caducis sive proscriptorum, "On Abandoned Property and That of Proscribed Persons" (Novella Maioriani 5): the comes privatae largitionis Ennodius was to admonish the provincial judges against defrauding the imperial treasure by keeping for themselves a part of the money collected.

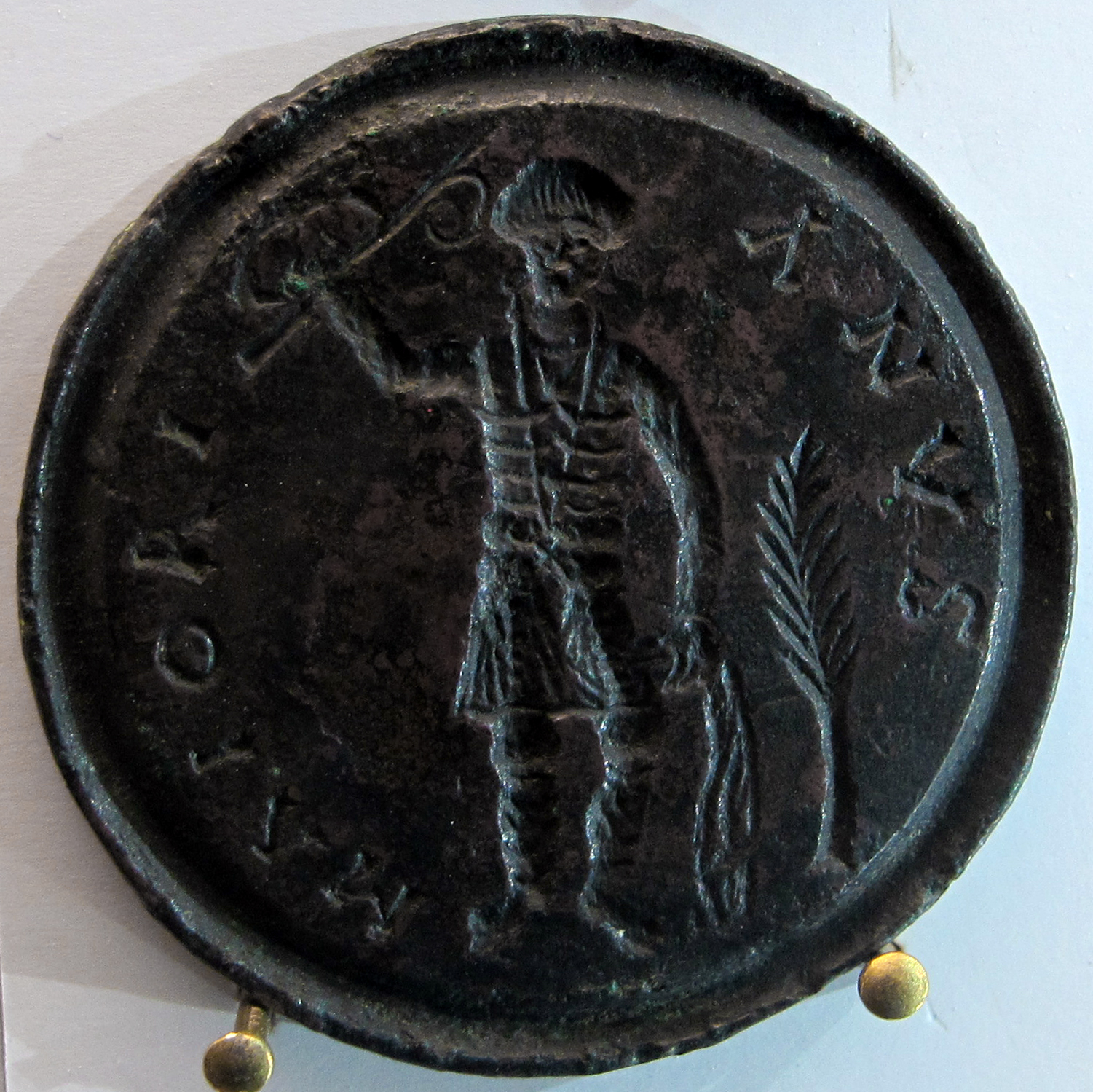
Contorniate depicting emperor Majorian

The Emperor was also interested in repairing the backbone of the imperial administration. On 8 May 458, Majorian issued a law entitled De defensoribus civitatum, "The Defenders of the Municipalities" (Novella Maioriani 3), to re-establish the office of the Defensor civitatis. This city magistrate represented the interests of the citizens in trials against the public administration, particularly in fiscal matters; this magistracy was still in existence, but actually ineffective, since it was often held by the same officials who cheated the population.

Another law was issued on 6 November to strengthen the magistracy of the decurions. De curialibus et de agnatione vel distractione praediorum et de ceteris negotiis, "Decurions, Their Children and The Sale of Their Landed Estates" (Novella Maioriani 7), was issued to forgive past abuses perpetrated by the decurions. This forbade them from leaving their status (going into hiding or marrying slave or tenant farmers) or alienating their own properties.

Majorian minted coins in gold, silver and bronze. Gold coinage was minted in great quantities. On these coins the Emperor is depicted, with few exceptions, with a combat helmet, a spear, a shield, and a chi-rho, looking towards the right; this typology was derived from a rare type minted in Ravenna for Honorius and used in great quantities only by Majorian, it was dropped by his successors. The first series of solidi were probably minted in Ravenna, and bear on the obverse the joint portrait of Majorian and Leo I, thus celebrating the mutual recognition of the two Roman emperors. The mints of Ravenna and Milan issued both solidi and tremisses from the beginning of Majorian's reign.

No series of semisses are attested for these two mints, probably because the semisses were typically minted by the mint of Rome and this mint was not active under Majorian, who never visited the ancient capital of his Empire during his four years of rule. The minting of solidi is attested for the mint of Arelate in 458, a fact compatible with the presence of Majorian in Gaul in that year. This mint was again active in 460, when the Emperor returned from his campaign in Hispania. The Visigoths minted some reproductions of his solidi, modelled after the issues of the Arelate mint: as Arelate issued only solidi, the Visigoths used those designs also for the tremissis.

Silver coinage was issued almost exclusively by the Gallic mints; it has been suggested that these series were not issued by Majorian, but by Aegidius after the Emperor's death, to mark the fact that he did not recognize his successor, Libius Severus. Majorian also produced great quantities of nummi of great weight, mostly minted at Ravenna and Milan, and some contorniates, mostly in Rome, but probably also in Ravenna.

=== Natalist policies ===
The diffusion of Christianity in the Empire caused some social changes within the aristocratic families. In several wealthy families, daughters were obliged to take religious vows and never marry, so that the family wealth would not be dispersed in dowries. Majorian thought that this behaviour was harmful to the State, because it reduced the number of Roman children, and because it caused the girls to start illicit affairs. On 26 October 458, the Emperor addressed a law, the Novella Maioriani 6, to the Praetorian prefect of Italy, Caecina Decius Basilius.

This law, titled De sanctimonialibus vel viduis et de successionibus earum ("Holy Maidens, Widows, and Their Succession"), imposed a minimum age of 40 for taking religious vows, considering that at this age the sexual drives of the initiated would be dormant. The law also granted women who had been forced to take religious vows, and were subsequently disinherited, the same rights on the legacy of parents as their brothers and sisters.

In order to solve this same problem of the decline of the Roman population, in particular compared with the growth of the barbarians allocated within the imperial boundaries, Majorian addressed the problem of young women widowed and without children who never remarried because of the influence of the clergy, to whom they destined their goods in their will. The young widows were prohibited from taking religious vows.

By the same measure, departing in this from the policy of the Eastern Empire, Majorian insisted that a marriage without dowry and pre-wedding exchange of gifts (first from the bride's family to the groom, then in the opposite direction) was invalid; he simultaneously ended the practice of requesting pre-wedding gifts of a value considerably higher than the dowry.

=== Relationship with the senatorial aristocracy ===
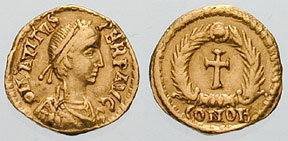
Avitus, the predecessor of Majorian on the imperial throne, had alienated the support of the Roman senatorial aristocracy by appointing members of the Gallo-Roman aristocracy, of which he was a part, to the most important offices of the imperial administration. He was overthrown by Majorian, who did not repeat the error and rotated the main offices between representatives of the two aristocracies.

When Majorian took power by deposing Avitus, the province of Gaul, where Avitus's power was based, did not recognize the new Emperor. When Majorian re-conquered the province, he chose to forgive this rebellion. The reason was that Majorian understood that one of the mistakes of his predecessor was to promote and trust only the senatorial aristocracy of Gaul, the region he came from, favouring it over the senatorial aristocracy of Italy.

Majorian, instead, decided to gain the favour of the wealthy and noble families of the recovered province by involving them in the imperial administration, together with the Italian aristocracy that had supported him since the beginning. For evidence of this policy, one can point to the origins of the high civil servants of his administration, in particular of the consuls, whom the Emperor appointed jointly with his Eastern colleague.

In the first year (458) Majorian reserved the honour for himself, as was usual for the augusti, while in the second year he appointed his former colleague and powerful magister militum, Ricimer. Then, for the year 460, he choose the Gallic senator Magnus, and for the next year the Italian senator Severinus. Magnus had been appointed Praetorian prefect of Gaul in 458, while the Praetorian prefect of Italy was Caecina Decius Basilius, who was the patron of the Gallic senator (and poet) Sidonius Apollinaris, while the comes privatae largitionis, Ennodius, was related to a family with interests in Arelate.

Majorian also showed great respect towards the Roman senate, as suggested by the message he addressed to it on the eve of his coronation: he promised the senators he would not take into account the accusations of informers, which were much feared as they might be used by the Emperor to cause the fall of influential figures. He followed through on his promises, as told by Sidonius Apollinaris, who had been anonymously accused of the authorship of a pamphlet against some influential figures: during a dinner together, Majorian defused the risky situation with a witticism.

=== Conservation of the monuments of Rome ===
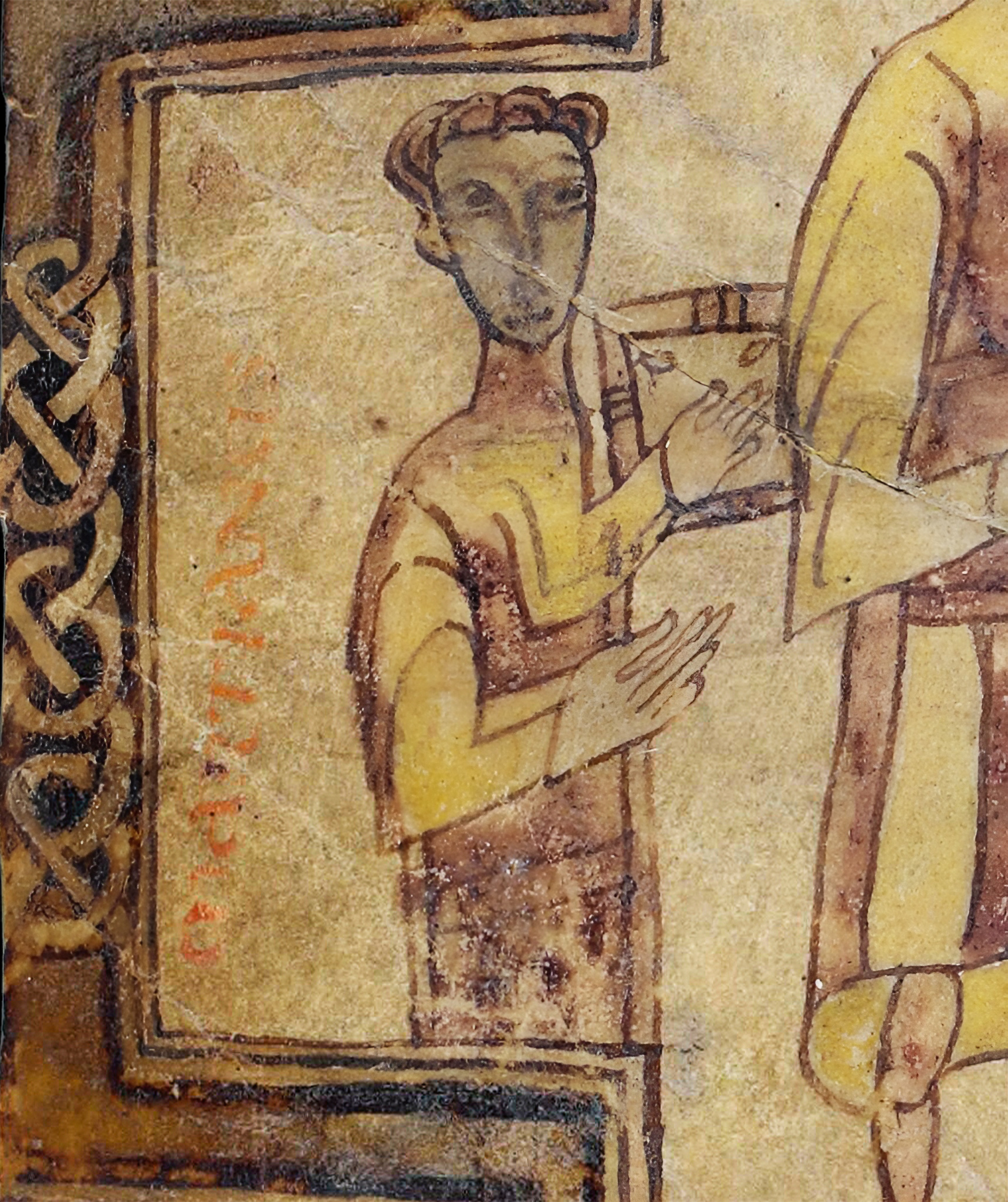
Majorian from a 9th-century copy of the Breviary of Alaric

From the beginning of the 4th century, the monuments of Rome, and more generally all buildings of some value that were in a state of neglect for various reasons, were increasingly used as quarries for valuable building materials. This practice, in fact, was cheaper and more convenient than import from remote locations, which was sometimes rendered difficult or impossible by the control of the sea by the Vandals. Roman officials conceded upon petition the use for construction of marble, stone and brick recovered from demolition of ancient monuments:

Hence the occasion now arises that also each and every person who is constructing a private edifice through the favoritism of the judges who are situated in the City, does not hesitate to take presumptuously and to transfer the necessary materials from the public places, although those things which belong to the splendor of the cities ought to be preserved by civic affection, even under the necessity of repair.

— Novella Maioriani 4, Clyde Pharr (ed.), The Theodosian code: and Novels The Lawbook Exchange, Ltd., 2001 ISBN 1-58477-146-1, pp. 553–554.

To cope with this phenomenon, Majorian promulgated a law, Novella Maioriani 4, De aedificiis pubblicis ("Public Buildings"), in Ravenna on 11 July 459, addressed to Aemilianus, praefectus urbi of Rome. The punishment for judges who had allowed the destruction of ancient public buildings was 50 pounds of gold, while their subordinates were whipped and had both hands amputated. Those who had removed materials from public buildings were to return them. The Senate had the power to decide whether there were extreme conditions that justified the demolition of an old building and, if it decided for the demolition, the Emperor still had the right to order that the resulting materials should be used to decorate other public buildings.

== Fall and death ==
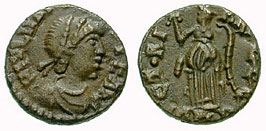
As coin of Majorian

Just as Avitus's fate had been decided by the betrayal of Ricimer and Majorian and the dismissal of his German guard, so the fate of Majorian himself was decided by the disbandment of his army and a plot organized by Ricimer. In fact, while the Emperor was busy away from Italy, the barbarian patricius et magister militum had gathered around himself the aristocratic opposition to his former comrade with whom, just a few years earlier, he had cultivated dreams of power. Majorian's legislation had shown that he intended to intervene decisively on issues that plagued the empire, even if they countered the interests of influential aristocrats.

After spending the winter and the spring after the defeat in the Vandal campaign at Arelate, Majorian left during summer with a small guard (probably domestici), probably with the intention to reach Rome. He did not try to cross the Alps, as he had done in 458, but moved from Arelate along the via Aurelia, in Southern Gallia and Liguria, only to change direction and move towards the north: he had probably received news that Ricimer was coming to meet him, and wanted to reach Dertona and from there take the via Aemilia towards Ravenna. However Ricimer intercepted him in Dertona (not far from Piacenza, where Avitus had been killed) on 2 August, and had him arrested and deposed.

The Emperor was deprived of his dress and diadem, and beaten. After five days, on 7 August, Majorian was beheaded near the river Iria. The city of Tortona now hosts, in the church of St. Matthew, a building traditionally identified as the "mausoleum of Majorian"; however, Ennodius complains that Majorian did not receive an appropriate burial.

Ricimer spread the news that Majorian had died of natural causes, then waited for three months before placing on the imperial throne a person he believed he could manipulate. He finally chose Libius Severus, a senator of no political distinction, probably selected to please the Italian senatorial aristocracy. The new emperor was not recognized by the Eastern Emperor Leo I, nor by any of the generals who had served under Majorian: not by Aegidius in Gaul, not by Marcellinus in Sicily and Illyria, and not by Nepotianus in Hispania.

== Legacy ==
According to historian Edward Gibbon, Majorian "presents the welcome discovery of a great and heroic character, such as sometimes arise, in a degenerate age, to vindicate the honour of the human species". The Encyclopædia Britannica likewise calls him "the only man to hold that office [i.e. the imperial throne] in the 5th century who had some claim to greatness."

== Sources ==
=== Primary sources ===
- Hydatius, Chronicle
- John of Antioch, Historia chronike
- Jordanes, Getica
- Marcellinus Comes, Annales
- Priscus, History
- Procopius, Vandal War
- Sidonius Apollinaris, Carmina; Letters. Translation: Anderson, W.B., Sidonius. Poems and Letters, 2 vols. (Loeb, 1936–1965).

=== Secondary sources ===
- Edward Gibbon, The History of the Decline and Fall of the Roman Empire, Chapter XXXVI "Total Extinction Of The Western Empire".
- Judith Evans Grubbs, Women and the Law in the Roman Empire, Routledge, 2002, ISBN 0-415-15240-2.
- Penny MacGeorge, Late Roman Warlords, Oxford University Press, 2002, ISBN 0-19-925244-0.
- Ralph W. Mathisen, "Julius Valerius Maiorianus (18 February/28 December 457 – 2/7 August 461)", De Imperatoribus Romanis.
- John Michael O'Flynn, Generalissimos of the Western Roman Empire, University of Alberta, 1983, ISBN 0-88864-031-5.
- Fabrizio Oppedisano, "Il generale contro l'imperatore. La politica di Maioriano e il dissidio con Ricimero," Athenaeum 97 (2009) pp. 543–561.
- Fabrizio Oppedisano, L'impero d'Occidente negli anni di Maioriano, Roma : «L’Erma» di Bretschneider, 2013, ISBN 978-88-913-0285-4.

=== Further reading ===
- Ralph W. Mathisen, "Resistance and Reconciliation: Majorian and the Gallic Aristocracy after the Fall of Avitus," Francia 7 (1979) pp. 597–627.
- Gerald E. Max, Majorian Augustus. PhD diss., University of Wisconsin, 1975.
- Gerald E. Max, "Political Intrigue during the Reigns of the Western Roman Emperors Avitus and Majorian," Historia 28 (1979) pp. 225–237.
- Gerald E. Max, "Procopius' Portrait of the Emperor Majorian: History and Historiography," Byzantinische Zeitscrift, Sonderdruck Aus Band 74/1981, pp. 1–6.
- Meyer, Helmut, "Der Regierungsantritt Kaiser Majorians," Byzantinische Zeitschrift 62 (1969) pp. 5–12.
- Stewart I. Oost, "Aëtius and Majorian," Classical Philology 59 (1964) pp. 23–29.
- Fabrizio Oppedisano, "Maioriano, la plebe e il defensor civitatis," Rivista di filologia e di istruzione classica 139 (2011), pp. 422–448.
- Ferdinando Angeletti, "La Novella Maiorani IV: Piccolo antico esempio di tutela del patrimonio culturale" in Storiadelmondo N. 89 (2019)

Regnal titles
Preceded by Avitus	Western Roman emperor 457–461	Succeeded by Libius Severus
Preceded by Constantinus; Rufus	Roman consul 458 with Leo Augustus	Succeeded by Ricimer; Patricius
