= Nepotianus (magister militiae) =

Roman general

Nepotianus (died 465) was a general of the Western Roman Empire.

== Life ==
Nepotianus married the sister of Marcellinus, the semi-independent ruler of Dalmatia; Julius Nepos, last Western Roman Emperor, might have been their son and did at some point succeed Nepotianus as ruler of Dalmatia.

In the Gothic War (457-458) he was comes et magister utriusque militiae and together with Aegidius, he commanded the army of the Western Emperor, Majorian. That same year Majorian started a military campaign to re-conquer Gaul; the army, reinforced by some barbarian mercenaries, dislodged the Visigoths of Theodoric II from Arelate and obliged them to return to their condition of foederati. With the help of his renewed foederati, Majorian entered in the Rhone Valley, conquering its populations "some by arms and some by diplomacy". He defeated the Burgundians and besieged and conquered the city of Lugdunum: the rebel city was heavily fined, while the Bagaudae were forced to join the Empire.

In 459, some envoys of Nepotianus and of the Gothic comes Sunieric arrived in Gallaecia to announce the victory of Majorian and the treaty between the Romans and the Visigoths.

In May 460, Nepotianus and Sunieric led some troops in a joint attack with Theodoric to the Suebi: Nepotianus moved to Gallaecia and attacked the Suebic army, defeating it near Lucus Augusti.

At the beginning of the 460s, Nepotianus was deposed by order of Theodoric II, maybe because he opposed the powerful magister militum Ricimer, and was substituted by Arborius. He died in 465.

== Bibliography ==
- Paul Fouracre, The New Cambridge Medieval History, Cambridge University Press, 2005, ISBN 0-521-36291-1, pp. 165–166.
- Martindale, John R.; Jones, A. H. M.; Morris, John, eds. (1971). "Nepotianus 2". The Prosopography of the Later Roman Empire: Volume I, AD 260–395. Cambridge: Cambridge University Press. p. 778. ISBN 0-521-07233-6.
- Ralph W. Mathisen, "Julius Valerius Maiorianus (18 February/28 December 457 - 2/7 August 461)", De Imperatoribus Romanis.
- John Michael O'Flynn, Generalissimos of the Western Roman Empire, University of Alberta, 1983, ISBN 0-88864-031-5.
