= Marcellinus (magister militum) =

5th century CE Roman general who ruled over Dalmatia

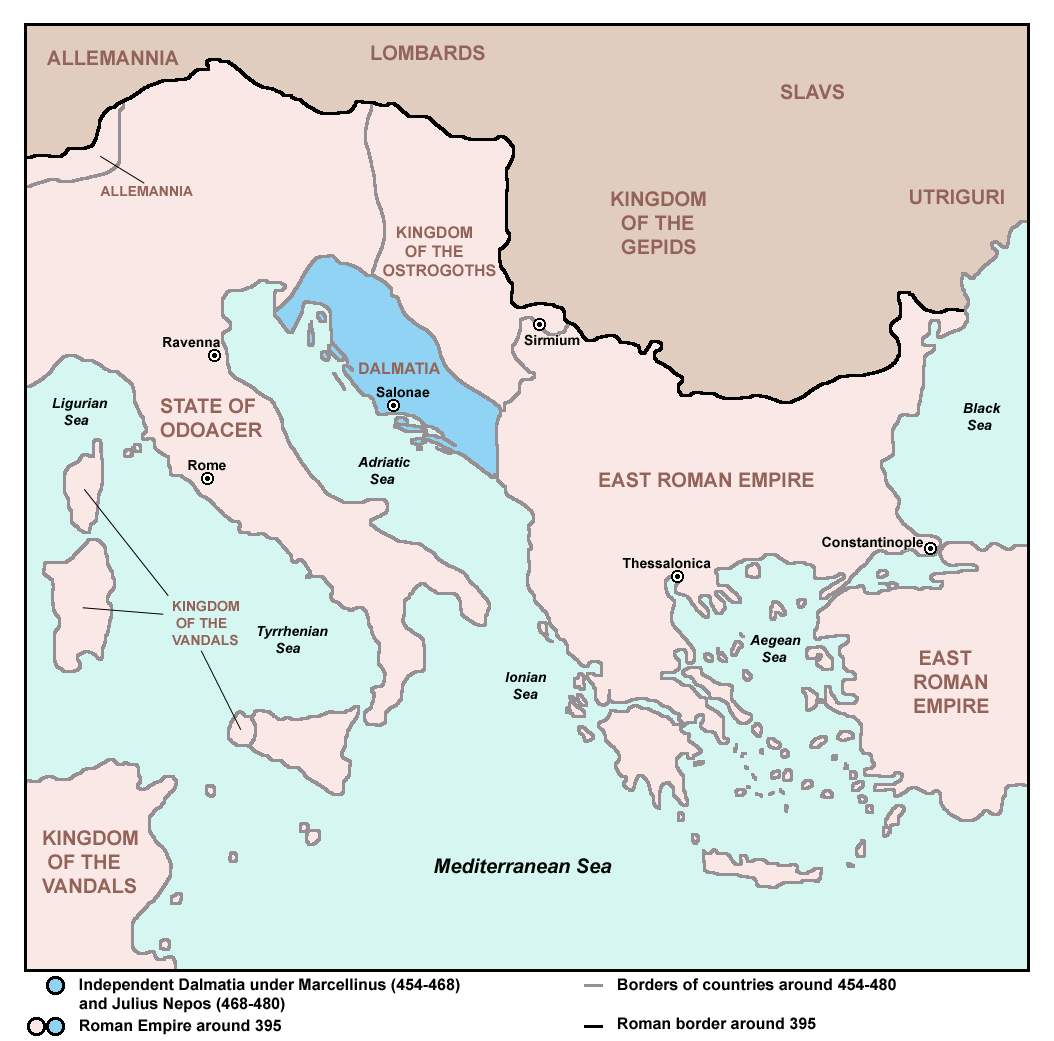
The approximate area of Dalmatia ruled by Marcellinus.

Marcellinus (died August 468) was a Roman general and patrician who ruled over the region of Dalmatia in the Western Roman Empire and held sway with the army there from 454 until his death. Governing Dalmatia both independently from, and under, six Emperors during the twilight of the Western Empire, Marcellinus proved to be an able administrator and military personality with sources making reference that he ruled justly and well and kept Dalmatia independent of the emperor and of barbarian rulers.

== Life ==
=== Origins ===
Marcellinus was said to have been of good birth and character and to have had a good education, he was also a devout pagan, and is alleged to have been a skilled soothsayer. Nothing is known of Marcellinus's early life; records first mention his name in 454 when he rebelled against Western Emperor Valentinian III following his murder and assassination of Flavius Aëtius who was Marcellinus's friend. He was in Dalmatia at the time and is believed to have held the title of comes rei militaris. He was powerful enough to seize control of Dalmatia for himself and was presumably able to do this because he was commander of the troops there. He appears to have remained ruler of Dalmatia down to 468 and to have preserved his independence except for briefly accepting the authority of the Emperors Majorian and Anthemius.

=== Military career ===
During the dying days of the western half of the empire there remained four main players which participated in the power games revolving around the throne; the Eastern Roman Empire as one continued to play a significant political role as did the western Roman military which made up the other three. The Gallic army was prominent, especially under Aegidius in the 460's, the Italian army was the main influence for Ricimer, and the forces of Dalmatia gave a solid base of power and support between 450 and 480 for Marcellinus and later his nephew Western Emperor Julius Nepos.

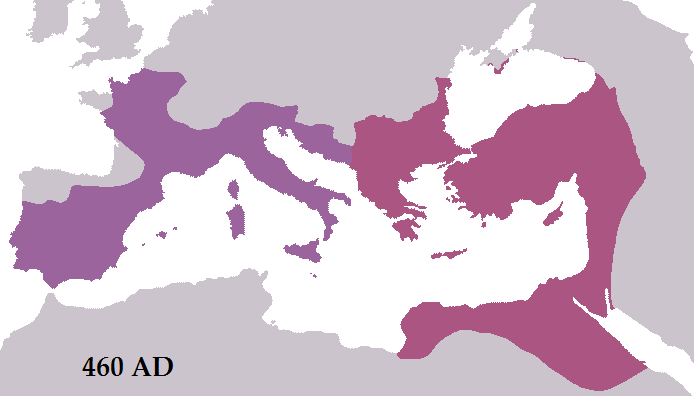
The territorial extent of both halves of the Roman Empire at the time of Marcellinus's rule in Dalmatia. Note that the territories in the West fluctuated in Roman control over Marcellinus's life, especially in Gaul and Hispania.

When Majorian took the throne in December 457 Marcellinus pledged his allegiance to the new emperor and was soon sent to guard Sicily against the Vandals; perhaps at this time he held the title of magister militum. Marcellinus was to take part in a joint attack of Vandal Africa, with him coming from Sicily and Majorian invading from Hispania, but before Majorian could begin his campaign the Vandals inflicted a severe defeat on the attack fleet and a year later in 461 the emperor was murdered by Ricimer, who soon after tried to bribe Marcellinus's troops who were mostly Huns, attempting to reduce the general’s power. This forced Marcellinus to leave Sicily and return to Dalmatia where he would work closely with the Eastern Emperor Leo I. In 464 or 465 Marcellinus returned to Sicily to defend the island against the Vandals, this action posed a direct threat to the personal power and prestige of Ricimer who had already appealed to Leo to prevent Marcellinus from acting against him militarily. Leo recognized Marcellinus as magister militum but not by Ricimer and his new puppet emperor Libius Severus in the West. His title seems to have changed around this time to that of magister militum Dalmatiae though it is not for certain, only that his nephew who took over for him after held this title. During this time his power seems to have grown and it was possible he could attack Italy, but at the request of the Italians, the eastern court sent an envoy to him and he agreed not to attack.

In the spring of 467 he was one of the comites who accompanied the new emperor of the West, Anthemius, to Italy with a large army. In 468, he is seen with the title of patrician which was given to him by Anthemius. Some explaining needs to be said here, since at this time Ricimer still held the titles magister utriusque militum and patrician, and it appears Anthemius wished for Marcellinus to have the similar power held by Ricimer in order to be a counterbalance to him. In the East, it was established practice for both magistri militum praesentales to be equal but in the West it had become common for one magister, (usually the magister peditum), to be superior over the other and so this may have been an attempt by Anthemius to introduce the eastern structure and rule like an eastern emperor using the successful and trustworthy Marcellinus as his second commander.

=== Death ===
In 468, Leo organized a grand campaign against the Vandals in Africa in which the East and West would commit substantial forces. Marcellinus was given command of the forces from the western empire and the campaign was to be a three-pronged assault. Marcellinus by this time had expelled the Vandals from Sicily and had also retaken Sardinia and was to be taken by fleet to Africa. Basiliscus, Leo's brother-in-law, with the main army in an armada of over 1,000 ships would land at a distance from Carthage and link up with the comes rei militis Heraclius advancing from Egypt and Tripolitania. Marcellinus was supposed to have a command of some 10,000 to 20,000 troops. Marcellinus never sailed for Africa, perhaps due to Ricimer's veto; either he would not spare so many troops to become bogged in a campaign in Africa hoping the East would do the job for him, or he resented the military capabilities of Marcellinus who was obviously the favorite of Anthemius. Regardless of the reason, Marcellinus, not able to participate in the campaign and Basiliscus blundering in the Battle of Cape Bon, assured that the operation would result in failure and the West lost its only chance to regain Africa from the Vandals and possibly stave off its demise.

Marcellinus was murdered in Sicily that same year, possibly by Ricimer's order. After his death, his nephew Julius Nepos inherited his uncle's control over Dalmatia and was recorded as having the title magister militum Dalmatiae. Dalmatia would serve Julius Nepos in the same fashion as it had Marcellinus and due to the prestige and ability of Julius Nepos, the Eastern Emperor Leo I would push for him to be the new Western Emperor in 474.

== Source of power ==
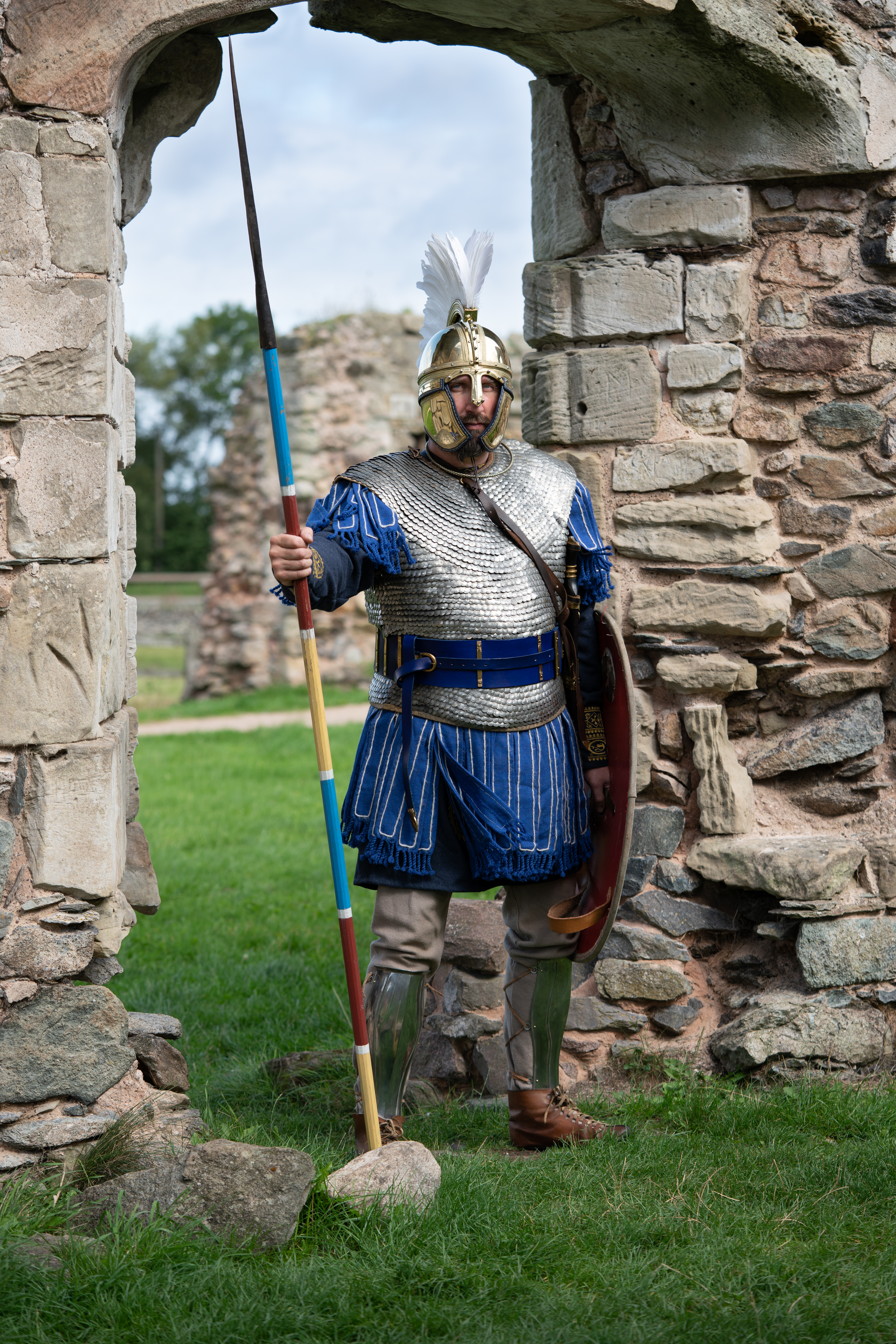
A historical reenactor depicting a junior officer of the Roman Army during the fourth century. Such equipment worn would be similar to that of soldiers during Marcellinus's time.

A topic of much debate concerns Marcellinus's source of power, mainly the forces under his command. This aspect becomes important in understanding his role as a player in the political and military theater of the Western Empire. A noteworthy comment on his army is that his troops were said to have always been well-equipped; to say that in an age when the armies in the west were declining this becomes especially important.

As the comes rei militaris Dalmatiae Marcellinus had a substantial fleet at his disposal which was based at Salona, and which would become of great importance in his career. From giving him the necessary means to threaten Italy with invasion, his ability to invade and secure Sicily on two occasions and from whence he accompanied Anthemius with an army from the East as well as forces of his own to install Anthemius as Emperor.

As for his land forces, it is known for certain he had Hunnic troops. But it is not clear if these were federate forces or mercenaries. Regardless of which one they were, it is not surprising he had Huns in his army since the break up of the Hunnic Empire came in 454.

He also had manpower to draw on from north of the Sava River and from traditional recruiting grounds in the Dalmatian interior. Perhaps most important of all, and the source of the "well-equipped" phrase, is that Marcellinus had within his region the imperial arms factory of Dalmatia, a naval arsenal at Salona (near present-day Split) and access to mining resources of lead in Domavia (near present-day Srebrenica) and iron in the Sava Valley. Due to the geography of Dalmatia which deterred approach from land (for the coastal cities), and his control of the Adriatic Sea, Marcellinus was quite unassailable which allowed him to become very active in major areas of the West.

== Coniuratio Marcellana ==
Marcellinus may have been the individual of topic in the so-called coniuratio Marcellana in 457; this may have been a movement in Gaul after the death of Avitus in late 456/early 457 to put Marcellinus on the throne. Nothing, however, suggests that he himself favored the idea.

There is controversy in the academic world though as to who is really the topic of the machinations of the Gallo-Romano Aristocracy after the death of Avitus who was of Gallic origin and from amongst their own ranks. Many scholars old and new have either read the name of the event Marcellini, Marcelliniana instead of Marcellana. This does not make much sense to place Marcellinus as the person in question for this action of the Gallic aristocracy since he is not Gallic and most likely comes from a wealthy Dalmatian family. The assumption to place Marcellinus as the person being spoken of has only led others to assume then that he is Gallic in origin when there is absolutely no evidence to support this. Mathisen has shown that Marcellinus cannot be the person in question and that Apollinaris Sidonius was speaking of a Marcellus, who was a Gallic aristocrat. He demonstrates why Marcellinus cannot logically be the person in question by comparing other names written by the same author and showing that Sidonius using the same style in writing the names thus giving the support it is Marcellus not Marcellinus he speaks of.

== See also ==
- Vandal War (461-468)

Preceded by Position established	Military governor of Dalmatia	Succeeded by Julius Nepos
