= 461 =

461 in various calendars
- Gregorian calendar: 461; CDLXI
- Ab urbe condita: 1214
- Assyrian calendar: 5211
- Balinese saka calendar: 382–383
- Bengali calendar: −133 – −132
- Berber calendar: 1411
- Buddhist calendar: 1005
- Burmese calendar: −177
- Byzantine calendar: 5969–5970
- Chinese calendar: 庚子年 (Metal Rat); 3158 or 2951 — to — 辛丑年 (Metal Ox); 3159 or 2952
- Coptic calendar: 177–178
- Discordian calendar: 1627
- Ethiopian calendar: 453–454
- Hebrew calendar: 4221–4222
- Hindu calendars
- Vikram Samvat: 517–518
- Shaka Samvat: 382–383
- Kali Yuga: 3561–3562
- Holocene calendar: 10461
- Iranian calendar: 161 BP – 160 BP
- Islamic calendar: 166 BH – 165 BH
- Javanese calendar: 346–347
- Julian calendar: 461; CDLXI
- Korean calendar: 2794
- Minguo calendar: 1451 before ROC 民前1451年
- Nanakshahi calendar: −1007
- Seleucid era: 772/773 AG
- Thai solar calendar: 1003–1004
- Tibetan calendar: ལྕགས་ཕོ་བྱི་བ་ལོ་ (male Iron-Rat); 587 or 206 or −566 — to — ལྕགས་མོ་གླང་ལོ་ (female Iron-Ox); 588 or 207 or −565

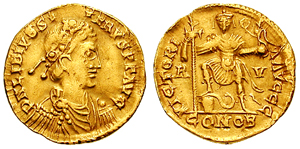
Solidus of Emperor Libius Severus

Year 461 (CDLXI) was a common year starting on Sunday of the Julian calendar. At the time, it was known as the Year of the Consulship of Severinus and Dagalaiphus (or, less frequently, year 1214 Ab urbe condita). The denomination 461 for this year has been used since the early medieval period, when the Anno Domini calendar era became the prevalent method in Europe for naming years.

== Events ==
=== By place ===
==== Roman Empire ====
- August 2 – Majorian is arrested near Tortona (Northern Italy), and deposed by Ricimer (magister militum) as puppet emperor.
- August 7 – Majorian, having been beaten and tortured for five days, is beheaded near the Iria River (Lombardy).
- Olybrius becomes the second candidate for the western throne. He is the husband of Placidia, who is being held in Vandal captivity.
- November 19 – Libius Severus, Roman senator from Lucania, is declared emperor of the Western Roman Empire.
- Vandal War (461-468): King Genseric continues the Vandal raids on the coast of Sicily and Italy. Ricimer sends an embassy to Carthage.

==== Europe ====
- Roman civil war of 461
  - The Visigoths under king Theodoric II recapture Septimania (Southern Gaul) after the assassination of Majorian, and invade Hispania again.
  - Aegidius becomes ruler over the Domain of Soissons (Gaul). He has friendly relations with the Romano-British (in Brittany).

==== Anatolia ====
- 461 Apahunik' earthquake. It affected the province of Apahunik', located to the north of Lake Van, in Anatolia.

=== By topic ===
==== Religion ====
- November 10 – Pope Leo I dies at Rome, age 61 (approximate), after a 21-year reign in which he has resisted Manichaeism and defended the Church against Nestorianism. He is succeeded by Hilarius as the 46th pope.
- Mamertus is elected bishop of Vienne (Gaul).

== Births ==
- Hilderic, king of the Vandals (approximate date)
- Romulus Augustulus, emperor of the Western Roman Empire

== Deaths ==
- August 7 – Majorian, emperor of the Western Roman Empire
- November 10 – Pope Leo I
- Palladius, first bishop of Ireland (approximate date)

== Sources ==
- Guidoboni, Emanuela; Traina, Giusto (1995), "A new catalogue of earthquakes in the historical Armenian area from antiquity to the 12th century", Annals of Geophysics, 38, doi:10.4401/ag-4134
