= Battle of Soissons (486) =

Battle between Syagrius's Soissons and the Salian Franks

- Part of Franco-Roman War of 486
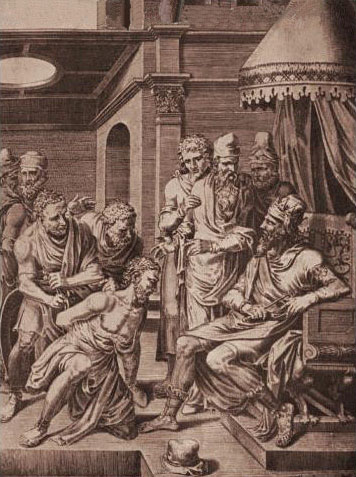
- The captured Syagrius is brought before Alaric II, who orders him sent to Clovis I
Date	486 AD
Location	near Soissons, Aisne
Result	Frankish victory; Fall of the Kingdom of Soissons

Belligerents
Salian Franks of Tournai and Cambrai	Kingdom of Soissons

Commanders and leaders
Clovis I Ragnachar; Wiomad	Syagrius

Strength
6,000	6,000

Casualties and losses
Unknown	Unknown

The Battle of Soissons was fought in 486 between Frankish forces under Clovis I and the Kingdom of Soissons under Syagrius. The latter was a Roman rump state that had emerged in Gaul following the collapse of the Western Roman Empire. The battle was a victory for the Franks, and led to the conquest of Syragrius' realm, a milestone for the Franks in their attempt to establish themselves as a major regional power.

In a sense, this conflict is also the struggle for power between the sons of two Roman generals who played an important role in the Late Roman period. It is seen as part of the broader Franco-Roman War of 486, which resulted in Clovis I's conquest of the bulk of Northern Gaul.

== Background ==
Gaul

The territory of the former Western Roman Empire at that time fell under the jurisdiction of Emperor Zeno in Constantinople, but his authority was minimal. The Roman field armies in the West had largely disintegrated, and local warlords and barbarian leaders had become the actual rulers. Zeno lacked adequate resources to impose his authority on them.

From the scarce sources it can be concluded that in the period before, the Roman army in Gaul was led by Aegidius, the father of Syagrius, until his death in 464 or 465. He was supported by the Frankish general Childeric, father of Clovis, who operated as Dux Belgica II north of the Somme, . He also received support from Arbogast, the comes Argentoratensis who defended the Rhine border near Trier.

After the fall of Emperor Majorianus in 461, a Civil War broke out, in which Aegidius resisted Ricimer who had elevated Libius Severus (461-465) to emperor in Ravenna. This civil war did not end in a victory, but in a fragmentation of the empire into autonomous territories. It is unclear whether Northern Gaul retained this independent position after Aegidius' death, because Paul, an army leader who was active afterwards, and died at Angers around 470, may well have acted again on behalf of the emperor. Under Anthemius (465-472) who became emperor after Libius Severus, the western emperor seems to have gained more authority again. During this period, Childeric was the most important player in Gaul who operated between the Loire and the Somme in the final phase of his rule. Nevertheless, there were more war leaders which had to be taken into account, Arbogast in Trier, in Cologne rex Sigobert and rex Ragnachar reigned in Camberabia.

In the final collapse of the Western Roman Empire between 476 and 480, Syagrius was the only remaining representative of Roman rule in the area between the Loire and the Somme. Syagrius was the son of Aegidius, Roman magister militum per Gallias from 457 to 461; he preserved his father's rump state, the Domain of Soissons, between the Somme and the Loire, calling himself dux.

Shortly after the death of the important Gothic king Euric (484), Clovis saw opportunities to attack the Romans south of the Somme. The bishop of Tours Gregory reports that in the fifth year of Clovis' reign, a war broke out with Syagrius.

== Strategic importance ==
The central location of Soissons in northern Gaul and its largely intact infrastructure allowed a level of stability in the years of the Migration Period, but also made the area tempting for their Frankish neighbours to the north-east. The realm of Syagrius was of almost the same size as the Frankish area, though the Franks were divided into small kingdoms, and, on the right bank of the Rhine, little touched by Roman culture. Nevertheless, Clovis I managed to assemble enough Franks to confront Syagrius's forces.

== Battle ==
Clovis issued a challenge to Syagrius naming the time and place of the battle. Gregory of Tours mentions that one Chararic had brought his forces to the battlefield but then stood aloof, hoping to ally with the winner.

The ensuing battle was a decisive victory for Clovis and his Franks. Syagrius fled to the Visigoths (under Alaric II), but Clovis threatened war and the Visigoths handed Syagrius over for execution. Gregory of Tours further informs us that Clovis sent messengers to Alaric with the ultimatum to deliver Syagrius under penalty of war. However, although Clovis had defeated Syagrius and conquered much of northern Gaul, in the eyes of Alaric—whose hegemony stretched over almost the entire area between the Strait of Gibraltar and the Loire to the Alps in the east—he was a political dwarf. The most likely course of events, according to historians, was that Alaric did not want problems in his border areas during his intervention in Italy against Odoaker in 490; and thus delivered Syagrius to Clovis. Clovis eventually had Syagrius secretly murdered.

Consequently, the realm of the Franks almost doubled in size; its border was now on the Loire adjacent to the realm of the Visigoths.

=== Size of the armies ===
Regarding the composition and numerical strength of the armies, we are largely in the dark. The bishop of Tours does not mention numbers, but based on comparable armies from that time it is estimated that Clovis' army was between 6,000 and 12,000 men strong. Syagrius' army was similar to this and consisted soldiers of both Frankish and Gallo-Roman descent, in addition to bucellarii.

=== Conquest of Northern Gaul ===
Syagrius flight did not mean that the entire area between the Loire and Somme suddenly fell into Clovis' hands. He had to take into account other leaders in the region and there must have been cities that kept their gates closed to him. It is clear that Trier was not conquered without a fight. Hans Hubert Anton emphatically connects the rise of Clovis with the end of Arbogastus. Historians assume that he also appropriated his territory. According to him, Arbogast fled to Chartres.

After his victory over Syagrius, Clovis tried to bind his defeated soldiers to himself, regardless of their origin. Procopius reports to us in his History of the Wars that there were large groups of border soldiers stationed in Gaul who, cut off from Rome, refused to submit to Euric. According to Wijnendaele, Clovis thus strengthened his military reserve with them and he succeeded in uniting the different factions within his army. This Roman-Frankish army is the engine of his success in conquering the other provinces in Gaul that came under his rule.

== Aftermath ==
The Visigoths under Alaric were later routed at the Battle of Vouillé in 507 and forced to retreat south of the Pyrenées.

In due course, Clovis marched against Chararic, captured him and his sons, and forced them to accept ordination and tonsures as deacons. On report of their hope to regain power, he had them executed.

== Cultural depiction ==
The Battle of Soissons forms the climax of the historical novel by Justin Swanton, Centurion's Daughter.

== See also ==
- Franco-Roman War of 486
- Vase of Soissons
