= Battle of Orléans (463) =

463 battle in Orleans

- Part of Gothic war against Aegidius
Date	463 CE
Location	Aurelianum (Today Orléans, France) 47.9025°N 1.9090°E
Result	Coalition victory

Belligerents
Late Roman army Auxilia including Franks	Visigoths

Commanders and leaders
Aegidius; Childeric I (likely)	Federic †

The Battle of Orléans took place near Orleans and the River Loire in the year 463, in what is now central France. It was noted in contemporary records as a battle where Frederic, the brother of Theodoric II the king of the Visigoths, was killed leading a fight against either the Gallo-Roman general Aegidius, or in other reports Franks. Modern scholars generally believe that these Franks were allies of Aegidius, fighting either under his command, or that of Childeric I.

The battle was part of a broader border conflict between the Visigoths based in southwestern Gaul and Aegidius and his allies in northern Gaul, with the Loire region between them. The battle was also at least partly driven by larger conflicts within the Empire. In Rome in this period, the last few Western Roman Emperors had limited power over the Roman province of Gaul, and it was in effect divided into territories controlled by different military powers who nominally still fought in the name of Rome. The Visigothic king Theodoric II was an ally of the Roman emperor Libius Severus, while Aegidius had been a close ally of the previous emperor Majorian who had been murdered in 461, and he did not accept the new emperor.

Information about this war is scarce and fragmented. Priscus is the only source to mention a reason for the battle, suggesting that it was a border dispute. His writings have been largely lost, and only fragments have survived. Hydatius, Marius of Avenches, and later Jordanes, and Gregory of Tours also gave short remarks relevant to the conflict. Remarkably, the letters of the contemporary Gallo-Roman Sidonius Apollinaris do not mention anything about Aegidius directly, but they give insight into Gallo-Roman politics at the time.

== Background to the war ==
Aegidius became magister militum of Gaul in about 456-458—probably early in the reign of Western Roman emperor Majorian, who reigned 457-461, but possibly late in the reign of Avitus, whose short reign lasted from 455 until 456. Avitus was forced out of power by Majorian and Ricimer, who at that time were the highest military officers in the Western Roman Empire. Although the details of their relationships are unknown, like Aegidius both Avitus and Majorian were Gallo-Roman soldiers, and they had served, like both Aegidius and Ricimer, under Aetius who was assassinated in 454. Aegidius had considerable influence over Majorian.

In the period they worked together Aegidius and Marjorian worked against the expansion of power by the Burgundian kingdom in south-eastern Gaul, which had been accepted by Avitus and Ricimer. They expelled a Burgundian military force from Lyon, and then successfully fought their allies the Visigoths, who besieged Aegidius at a city in that region. It is possibly also during this period that Aegidius accused his predecessor Agrippinus of having favoured the barbarians, and attempted by clandestine means to detach provinces from the Roman state.

In 461 Majorian was assassinated by Ricimer, and replaced by Libius Severus, but Aegidius, like the Eastern emperor Leo I, refused to accept the new emperor. And Priscus wrote that he had a "large force" and was angry at the emperor, threatening to invade Italy. Also problematic for Rome, he mentioned Marcellinus, the magister militum in Illyricum, who also didn't accept the new emperor. At the same time Gaiseric, the Vandal king ruled over a large part of the Western Roman empire. According to Priscus, the only thing which stopped Aegidius from attacking Italy was a border conflict with the Visigoths.

In 462, chronicles mention Agrippinus in conflict with his enemy Aegidius because Agrippinus "betrayed" the strategically important city of Narbonne, apparently letting the Visigoths take control of it. Many modern scholars think that the Visigoths were effectively being bribed in order to fight Aegidius, and keep him isolated in northern Gaul.

In summary the battle of 463 is therefore normally understood to be a battle within the border conflict mentioned by Priscus, but it is also generally seen as part of a bigger internal conflict within what was left of the Roman Empire, with the Eastern and Western empires on opposing sides at this moment.

Aegidius also besieged Chinon, at an unknown date, possibly connected to the battle in 463. Despite these victories, he did not take the offensive against the Gothic position in Aquitaine, possibly due to lack of resources, or due to threats from other warlords such as perhaps comes (count) Paulus, Gundioc, and the Western Roman generals Arbogast and Agrippinus.

== Composition of the armies ==
According to Priscus, Aegidius had a "large army" estimated by modern historians to be in the thousands. It was probably a combination of Roman field army, foederati, Frankish allies, and local militias.

Franks were mentioned separately in the contemporary accounts and are likely to have played a significant role in the force of Aegidius, but according to MacGeorge it is uncertain whether they fought for him as allies, a personal attachment of bucellari, or mercenaries. She suggests that some "Franks" may even have been former Roman comitatenses.

Apart from the Franks, it is possible but uncertain that units of Alans and Sarmatians may have still existed in Gaul, which could be called upon. An Alan kingdom had been established by Aëtius in Orleans where they were maintained order against Armorican local rebels at least until 451, when these Alans fought on the side of Aëtius in the battle against Attila. There are also indications of at least one battle by the Visigoths against Alans after 451, although there were Alan settlements in more than one part of Gaul, for example in Valence.

The Gothic army of Theodoric II was probably smaller than that of his father Theodoric I (418–451), who once brought 20,000 men to his feet in collaboration with Aetius. Yet Theodoric II still had 10,000 to 15,000 fighters. This was not a fixed army, but consisted of an armed force of free men who brought their own weapons. The core consisted of infantry, supplemented by a significant cavalry unit formed by the elite. Many of their tactics were taken from those of the Romans.

Theodoric had made peace with the Suevi in Spain and was thus able to free troops that could be deployed against Aegidius. This army was led by his younger brother Frederic who had already fought battles in Spain. Aegidius mobilized his army and reinforced it with Frankish and Alanise foederati.

== Evidence for the battle ==
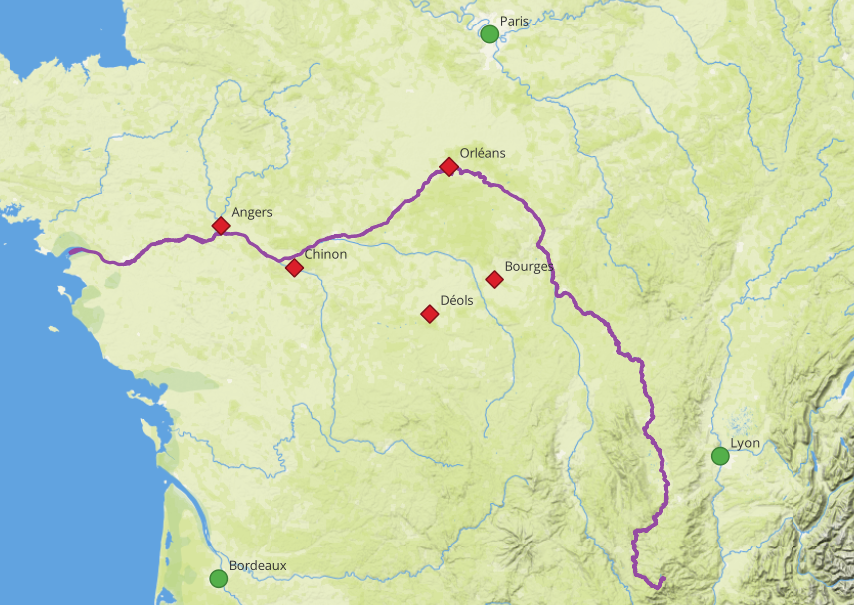
The red diamonds are places relevant to the Battle of Orleans in 463

Very little is known for certain about the battle. Modern scholars connect several records which directly mention what appears to be one battle of 463:

- The Gallic Chronicle of 511 says that Frederic the brother of King Theoderic died near the Loire, and specifies that he was fighting Franks.
- The chronicle of Marius of Avenches specifies that Frederic died in a battle against Aegidius, near Orleans between the Loire and Loiret rivers.
- Hydatius reported the death of Frederic in a set of entries under heading for the years 461-464. It said that Frederic the brother of King Theoderic, rose up against Aegidius, the comes commanding both branches of the military, and he was killed together with those with him. He specified that this happened in the Armorican region.

Another record which is generally seen as describing the same battle comes from Gregory of Tours (II, 18) who refers to the Frankish king Childeric fighting at Orleans, apparently before the death of Aegidius. Most modern historians think that he was with Aegidius leading Frankish troops allied to Aegidius. However the text is difficult to interpret, and it is difficult to exclude the possibility that Childeric fought against Aegidius. The passage begins as follows:

II.18. Igitur Childericus Aurilianis pugnas egit,	Now Childeric fought battles at Orleans,
Adovacrius vero cum Saxonibus Andecavo venit.	while Adovacrius came with the Saxons to Angers.
Magna tunc lues populum devastavit.	At that time a great plague devastated the people.
Mortuus est autem Egidius et reliquit filium Syagrium nomine.	Aegidius died and left a son named Syagrius.
Quo defuncto, Adovacrius de Andecavo vel aliis locis obsedes accepit.	After his [Aegidius'] death, Adovacrius received hostages from Angers and from other places.

MacGeorge has noted that the "usual reconstruction amalgamates all these notices to create the 'Battle of Orleans', won by Aegidius and Frankish allies, or federates, under Childeric", which is then "adduces as proof of an alliance between Aegidius and Childeric (often extended to Syagrius)". However, this amalgamation has at least been doubted by some scholars. In any case, while it is generally assumed that Childeric had a continuing alliance with Aegidius, there is very little historical evidence for it. In contrast to modern scholars, the medieval Chronicle of Fredegar and Liber Historiae Francorum both reported that after his return Childeric and Aegidius fought battles against each other. Fredegar says that Childeric fought many battles with Aegidius and that many slaughters of Romans were carried out by him.

== Death of Aegidius and further conflict on the Loire ==
Aegidius died soon afterwards, in 464/5 – possibly poisoned or ambushed. Later in the series of 461-464 entries by Hydatius which mentioned the battle, one entry notes that "on the thirteenth day before the Calends of August, a Monday, the sun was seen diminished" which is an eclipse dated to 464. Soon after this an entry says that Aegidius died "some say by ambush or treachery, others that he was deceived by poison. When he was gone, the Goths soon invaded the regions which he had been defending in the Roman name".

Although the chronology is unclear, Gregory of Tours mentions further battles near the Loire, at least one of which involved an attack by Visigoths. The leadership situation of the Gallo-Romans north of the Loire, and their relationship with the Franks and other allies and rebels there such as the Armoricans, remains unclear.

=== Further conflict in Bourges (probably about 469) ===
At the so-called Battle of Déols a Romano-British army under Riothamus was defeated by the Visigoths, but these Visigoths were then defeated by Romans and Franks. In the chronicle-like passage where he mentions battle in Orleans, Gregory next mentions the death of Aegidius and then a battle between Goths and Britons near Bourges, which is south of Orleans and the Loire. A otherwise unknown Roman leader named Count Paul seems to have been leading both Frankish and Romans forces.

Brittani de Bituricas a Gothis expulsi sunt, multis apud Dolensim vicum peremptis.	The Britons were driven out of the territory of the Bituriges by the Goths, many having been killed near the village of Déols.
Paulos vero comes cum Romanis ac Francis Gothis bella intulit et praedas egit.	Count Paul, meanwhile, together with Romans and Franks, made war on the Goths and took booty.

As a count (comes) Paul is clearly a Roman office holder, but he is unknown from any other record. He is mentioned first leading Roman and Frankish forces in the Loire region against the Visigoths, who were not yet mentioned in this passage. The Goths who he attacked together with Romans and Franks, and plundered, are normally presumed to be the Goths who had fought the Britons, mentioned in the previous line. Conflict between Goths and Britons based near the Loire is reported in other sources, which give an indication of the likely date:

- A letter from Sidonius Apollinaris to his friend Vincentius, written about 468 AD, records that Roman officials intercepted a letter written by the Praetorian Prefect of Gaul, Arvandus, to the Visigothic king Euric stating that "the Britons stationed beyond the Loire should be attacked" and that the Visigoths and Bugundians should divide Gaul between them.
- Jordanes in the 6th century reported that the Gothic king Euric (reigned 466-484) saw that the Roman emperors were weak and developed an ambition to rule all of Gaul. The emperor Anthemius (reigned 467-472) reacted by calling for help from Britons led by King Riothamus who came with a force of 12,000 men by boat and was stationed at the civitas of the Bituriges, around Bourges - which corresponds to the region where Gregory mentions the Goths defeating Britons. Like Gregory, Jordanes reports that the Goths defeated the Britons, saying that Riothamus "lost a great part of his army, he fled with all the men he could gather together". Gregory also notes that the Britons had been waiting for Roman support which did not arrive in time.

These events are normally dated to the period around 469 during the Gothic revolt of Euric, in which the new king of the Visigoths attempted once more to expand their territory into northern Gaul, although the new western emperor Anthemius was opposed to them this time. John of Antioch (fragment Mariev 229) reported that "the Gothic people who were living in western Gaul and who were of old named after Alaric", began hostilities at the same time as the Theodemir in Pannonia, and the Tzani in Trapezus. Déols is near modern Chateauroux, south of Bourges, and both are south of Orleans and would not have been "beyond the Loire".

Although modern scholars tend to interpret the passage to mean that Aegidius, Count Paul and Childeric were leaders on the same side, both the Chronicle of Fredegar and the Liber Historiae Francorum interpreted Gregory to mean that Childeric killed Count Paul, and as historian Edward James has pointed out "there were at least two factions among the Romans, and Paul's Romans were not necessarily Aegidius's Romans, nor, indeed, was Childeric ever necessary an ally of Aegidius".

=== Battle in Angers (possibly c. 470) ===
Next in the listing of events given by Gregory of Tours is a battle at Angers with the Saxons there who had been previously mentioned before the death of Aegidius, as having come to Angers, which is on the Loire. The chronology is not clear, but Count Paul is mentioned again. It is possible that these events immediately followed the fighting at Bourges.

Veniente vero Adovacrio Andecavus, Childericus rex sequenti die advenit	When Adovacrius came to Angers, King Childeric arrived on the following day;
interemptoque Paulo comite, civitatem obtinuit.	Count Paul having been killed, he took possession of the city.
Magno ea die incendio domus ecclesiae concremata est.	On that day, the house of the church was consumed by a great fire.
II.19. His itaque gestis, inter Saxones atque Romanos bellum gestum est:	After these events, war was fought between the Saxons and the Romans.
sed Saxones terga vertentes, multos de suis, Romanis insequentibus, gladio reliquerunt;	But the Saxons turned their backs and fled, and, as the Romans pursued them, they left many of their own men to the sword.
insulae eorum cum multo populo interempto, a Francis captae atque subversae sunt.	Their islands were captured and laid waste by the Franks, with many of the people killed.
Eo anno mense nono terra tremuit.	In that year, in the ninth month, the earth trembled.

The Saxons were under a leader named "Adovacrius", sometimes given by modern authors in an Anglo-Saxon spelling form, Eadwacer, or in a spelling the same as used for his contemporary the future King of Italy Odoacer, with whom he is sometimes equated. The origin of both the "Saxons" is however unclear. They may have come from Britain, and may have been coordinating with the Goths who were also mentioned in the same passage. Concerning their island bases Halsall has noted that "whether these are in the Loire, such as were used by the Vikings later on, or off the coast of Gaul is also unclear".

== See also ==
- Decline of the Western Roman Empire
