= Lugdunensis Secunda =

Lugdunensis Secunda Lugdunensis Secunda
- Province of the Roman Empire
- 296–c. 486
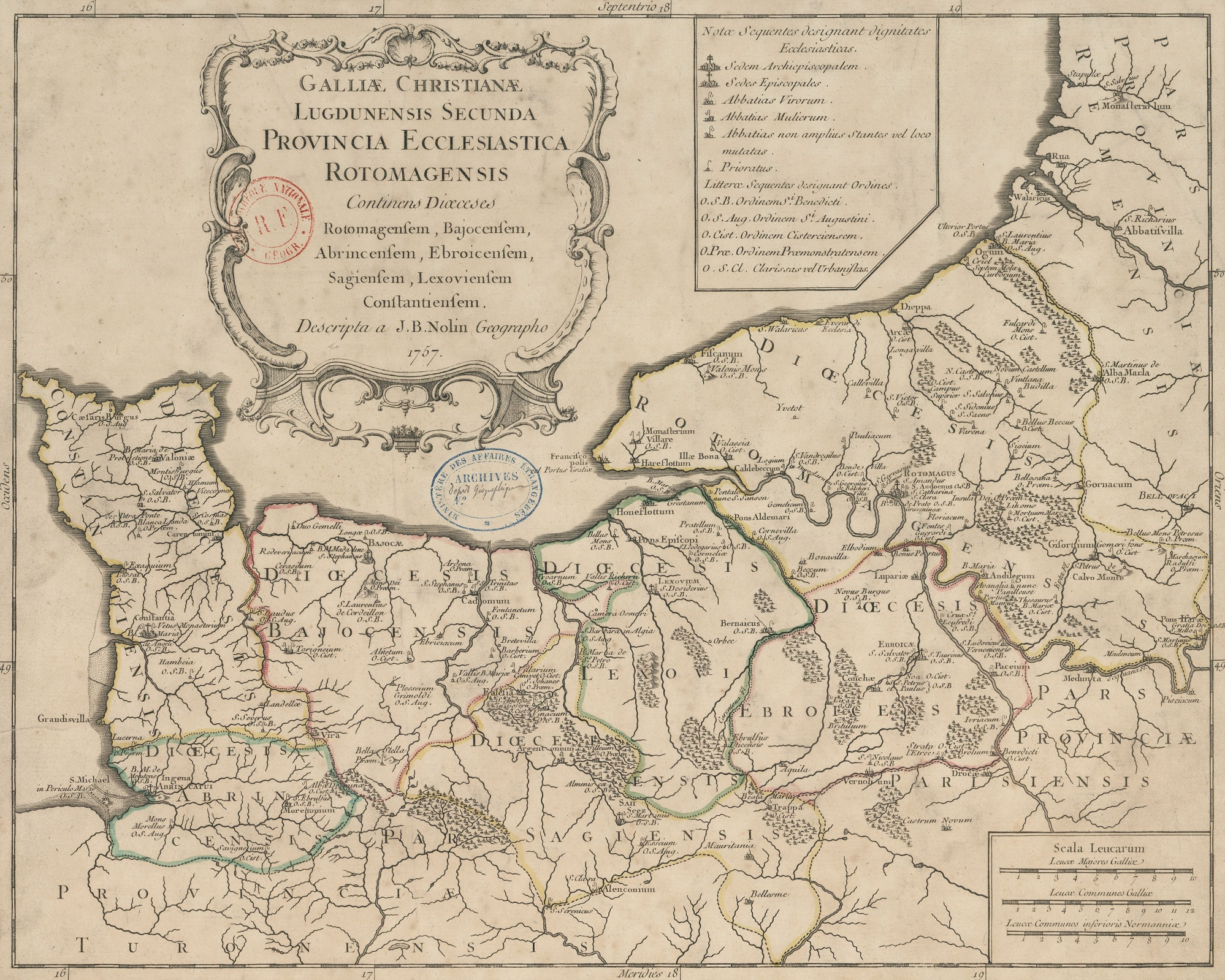
- Eighteenth-century map of the ecclesiastical province of Rouen, whose boundaries largely followed those of the former Roman province.
- Capital: Rotomagus
  - Type: Roman provincial administration
- Historical era: Late Roman Empire
  - Division of Gallia Lugdunensis under Diocletian: 296
  - Defeat of Syagrius and end of the Domain of Soissons: c. 486
Preceded by	Succeeded by
Gallia Lugdunensis	Domain of Soissons
- Today part of: Normandy, Île-de-France, Pays de la Loire, Channel Islands

Lugdunensis Secunda or Lyonnaise Secunda was a Roman Province in Northern France. It later became the basis of the Archdiocese of Rouen which in turn was the basis of the Duchy of Normandy.

== Foundation ==
The province was created in AD 296 in Emperor Diocletian's Tetrarchy when the imperial province of Gallia Lugdunensis was divided into two, Lugdunensis Prima, with its capital at Lyon, and Lugdunensis Secunda, with its capital at Rouen. This division is recorded in the Verona List. Both new provinces belonged to the diocese of Gaul, alongside the Helvetic, Belgian and German provinces. Constantine I (r. 306–337 AD) divided the provinces again with Lugdunensis Tertia, with its capital at Tours split off. According to the Notitia Dignitatum, Lugdunensis Secunda was governed by a praeses.

== Extent ==
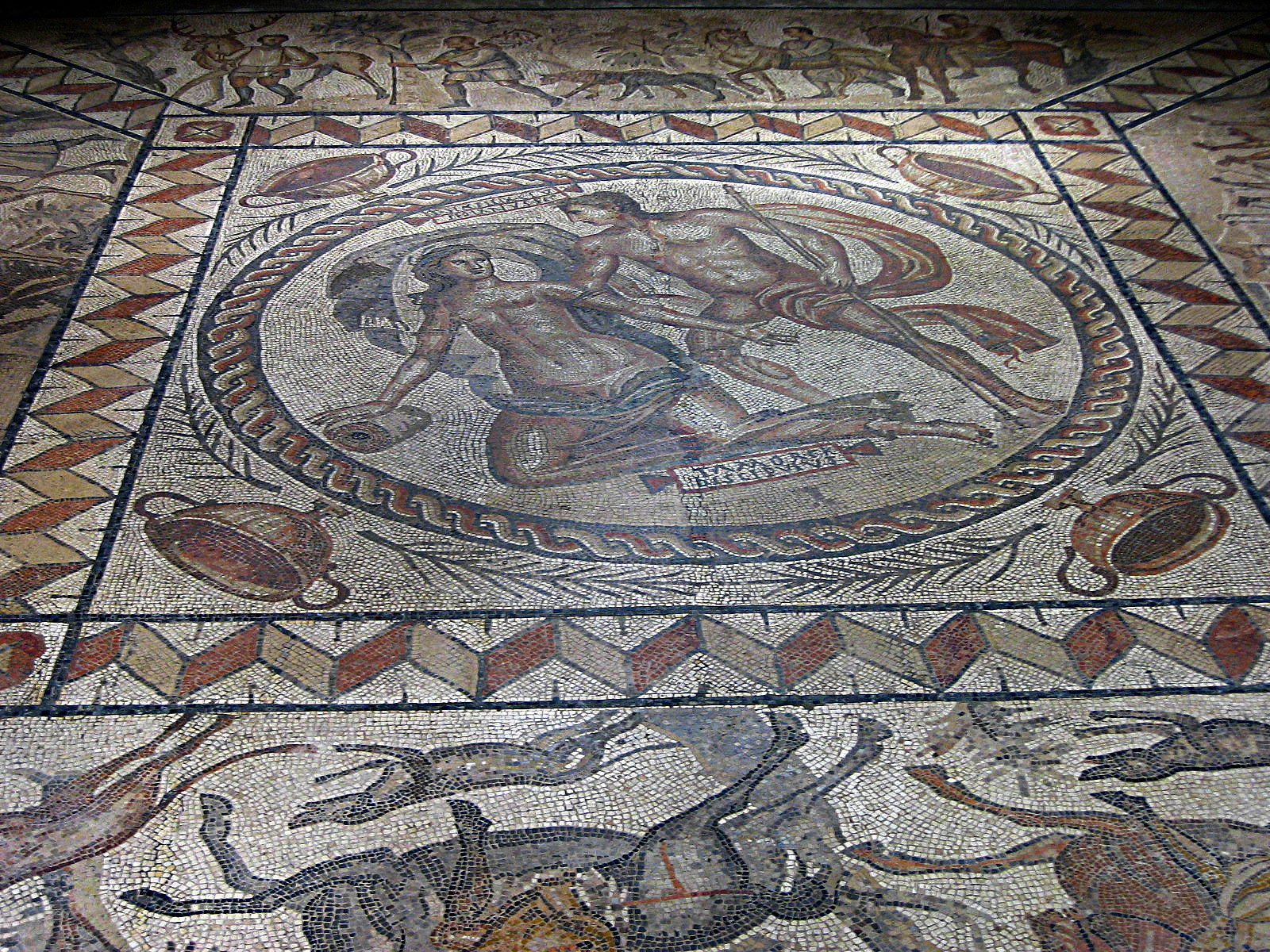
Great Lillebonne mosaic, in Seine-Maritime, kept in the departmental Museum of Antiquities in Rouen.

The province stretched from the Couesnon to the Bresle and was bounded to the south by the upper courses of the Sarthe and the Avre. The cities were the Metropolis civitas Rotomagensium (Rouen), Civitas Baiocassium (Augustodorum, Bayeux), Civitas Abrincatum (Ingena, Avranches), Civitas Ebroicorum (Mediolanum, Évreux), Civitas Saiorum (Sées), Civitas Lexoviorum (Noviomagus, Lisieux / Lieuvin) and Civitas Constantia (Coutances). The only significant difference with later Normandy was that Lyonnaise Secunda included the future Vexin français, with the land of the Veliocasses then remaining undivided, and these immigrants were granted permission to settle in the Empire.

== Barbarian Raids ==
From the second third of the 3rd century, "barbarian" raids devastated many parts of the Province. The coastline had to face maritime piracy from the Saxons, but also from the Franks and Frisians. The Romans built a system of coastal defences known as Saxon Shore on both sides of the English Channel. Coastal settlements were raided by Saxon pirates that finally settled mainly in the Bessin region. Traces of fire and hastily buried treasures bear evidence to the degree of insecurity in Northern Gaul. Coastal settlements risked raids by Saxon pirates.

As well as the coastal raids, In 406 Germanic and Alan tribes began invading from the east, followed by dispersed settlements mainly in the Pays de Bray, Pays de Caux and Vexin. Toponymy suggests that the various barbarian groups had installed themselves and formed alliances and federations already at the end of the 3rd century, well before the fall of the Western Roman Empire in 476. Modern archeology reveals their presence in different Merovingian cemeteries excavated east of Caen.

The situation was so severe that the Romans recruited Germans into their armies to fight the Germanic barbarians. An entire legion of Sueves was garrisoned at Constantia (in the pagus Constantinus), the administrative center of the Unelli tribe. Batavi were garrisoned at Civitas Baiocasensis (Bayeux ).

Non-Germanic elements such as the Alan-Sarmatians were also involved, as indicated by Pontic-Danubian artifacts found at Saint-Martin-de-Fontenay, but the Notitia dignitatum does not mention them for Lyonnaise Secunda, and no toponymic or lexical trace can be attributed to them in this province. These immigrants were granted permission to settle in the Empire.

== Christianity ==
Christianity also began to enter the area during this period and Rouen already had a metropolitan bishop by the 4th century, although there is a tradition that Saint Mellonius was ordained Bishop of Rouen in the mid-3rd century. The ecclesiastical province of Rouen was based on the frame of the province, whose limits corresponded almost exactly to the future duchy of Normandy.

The name Lugdunensis Secunda was the official title for the ecclesiastical province into the eighteenth century.

== Kingdom of Soissons ==
Eventually in 457, Aegidius established the Domain of Soissons which covered the area (with its seat the town of the same name Soissons, formerly the seat of the Suessiones), independent of and cut off from the Empire but with citizens nevertheless still considering themselves Roman. His son Syagrius succeeded him in 464 and remained until the kingdom was conquered in 486. Rural villages were abandoned and the remaining "Romans" confined themselves to within urban fortifications.

Some form of Roman rule, although cut off from other parts of the Western Roman Empire was maintained in the fifth century by the Domain of Soissons which controlled North Eastern France, although this effectively ceased to exist in AD 486/487 when the Roman general Syagrius was defeated by the Franks.
