= List of rump states =

Remnants of once-larger states

A rump state is the remnant of a once much larger state that was reduced in the wake of annexation, occupation, secession, decolonization, a successful coup d'état, or revolution on part of its former territory. The following is a list of polities described in reliable sources as rump states, organized by era.

== Ancient history ==
Rump state	Remnant of	Period	Notes
Theban kingdom of Upper Egypt	Egyptian kingdom	Second Intermediate Period	Following the conquest of Lower Egypt by the Hyksos, a rump Egyptian kingdom centered on Thebes survived in Upper Egypt and eventually reunified the country at the start of the New Kingdom.
Seleucid Empire (Northern Syria)	Seleucid Empire	2nd–1st century BC	Became a rump state in Northern Syria after losing most of its territory to the Parthian Empire.
Kingdom of Soissons	Western Roman Empire	461–486	Survived under Aegidius and Syagrius after the collapse of Roman rule in Gaul, until conquered by the Franks under Clovis I in 486.

== Post-classical history ==
Rump state	Remnant of	Period	Notes
Guge and Maryul	Tibetan Empire	10th century onward	Rump states of the Tibetan Empire in western Tibet and Ladakh.
Sultanate of Rum	Seljuk Empire	1077–1308	Rump state of the Seljuk Empire in Anatolia.
Armenian Kingdom of Cilicia	Armenian kingdom	1198–1375	An Armenian rump state in Cilicia.
Emirate of Rueda de Jalón	Taifa of Zaragoza	1110–1130	After the Almoravid conquest of the taifa in 1110, its last ruler, Abd-al-Malik, maintained a tiny rump emirate at Rueda de Jalón until his death.
Qara Khitai	Liao dynasty	1124–1218	Rump state of the Liao dynasty in Central Asia.
Southern Song	Northern Song dynasty	1127–1279	After the Jin dynasty assumed control over northern China in 1127, the Southern Song existed as a rump state, although it retained over half of the Northern Song's territory and more than half of its population.
Byzantine successor states (Nicaea, Trebizond, Morea, Theodoro, Epirus)	Byzantine Empire	13th–15th centuries	Formed following conquests from Muslim Turks and Crusaders.
Northern Yuan	Yuan dynasty	1368 onward	After the Ming dynasty established control over China proper, the Yuan dynasty retreated to the Mongolian Plateau and survived as a rump state.
Aq Qoyunlu remnants	Aq Qoyunlu	1503–1508	After Aq Qoyunlu rule collapsed in Iran, rump states survived until absorbed into the Safavid Empire by Ismail I.
Johor Sultanate	Malacca Sultanate	1511 onward	After the fall of Malacca to Portuguese naval forces, many of the Malaccan royalty and nobility retreated to the southern Malay Peninsula and established the Johor Sultanate.
Neo-Inca State	Inca Empire	1532–1572	Based at Vilcabamba after the Spanish conquest.
Andorra	Principality of Catalonia	1715 onward	After the Nueva Planta decrees, the Bishop of Urgell convinced the Spanish Bourbon authorities that the Valleys of Andorra had always been neutral and unrelated to the Principality of Catalonia, resulting in Andorra's political separation from Catalonia.

== Modern history ==
Rump state	Remnant of	Period	Notes
Luxembourg	Duchy of Luxembourg	1839 onward	Lost two-thirds of its territory in multiple partitions between 1659 and 1839, cemented by the Treaty of London, which gave most of its former territory to newly independent Belgium.
Vatican City	Papal States	1929 onward	After the capture of Rome in 1870 ended the Papal States, the pope was confined to the Vatican hill; the 1929 Lateran Treaty established Vatican City as an independent state retaining many Papal States institutions.
Brunei	Bruneian Sultanate (1368–1888)	1901 onward	Declined sharply during the 19th century, fell under a British protectorate, and was reduced to its present size by 1901; it regained independence in 1984 under the House of Bolkiah.
Republic of German-Austria	Austro-Hungarian Empire	1918–1919	Created as the initial rump state for areas with a predominantly German-speaking population of the former empire.
Republic of Armenia	First Republic of Armenia (1918 borders)	1920	Became a rump state following the Ankara Government victory in the Turkish–Armenian War.
First Hungarian Republic, Hungarian Soviet Republic, and Hungarian Republic	Historical Kingdom of Hungary	1918–1920	A succession of short-lived rump states within the historical territory of Hungary after World War I.
Second Czechoslovak Republic	Czechoslovakia	1938–1939	Formed after the Munich Agreement forced the cession of the Sudetenland to Germany; existed for 169 days, during which it also lost Carpathian Ruthenia.
Vichy France	France	1940–1944	After the fall of France, the unoccupied territory was reduced to the south with Vichy as administrative capital under Philippe Pétain; Germany later occupied all of France, and in 1944 the regime went into exile at the Sigmaringen enclave.
Kingdom of Italy (the "Kingdom of the South")	Kingdom of Italy	1943–1945	Reduced to a rump state in September 1943 while the Nazi-installed Italian Social Republic controlled most of its territory; with Allied support it gradually regained control by April 1945.
Federal Republic of Yugoslavia / Serbia and Montenegro	Socialist Federal Republic of Yugoslavia	1992–2006	Often viewed as the rump state left behind by SFR Yugoslavia after its breakup; SFR Yugoslavia itself was considered the "rump Yugoslavia" between the Slovenian and Croatian declarations of independence in June 1991 and its legal dissolution in April 1992.
East Germany	Germany	1949–1974	Initially, the German Democratic Republic (East Germany) maintained that it was the sole lawful government of all of Germany, denouncing the Federal Republic of Germany (West Germany) as an unlawfully constituted NATO puppet state; however, in reality it could only exercise its authority in the erstwhile Soviet occupation zone in Germany, a region which contained only three-tenths of Germany's area and one-fifth of its population, with the rest of Germany being controlled by the Federal Republic. In 1974, the East German constitution was amended to remove this exclusive mandate, in parallel with developments in West Germany such as Ostpolitik and détente, as part of the East German regime's policy of Abgrenzung (delimitation) aimed at creating a separate GDR national identity.
Taiwan	Republic of China	1949 onward	The rump state of the Republic of China left over after the retreat from the mainland; the current status of Taiwan is disputed and varies based on the observer's perspective.
Libyan Arab Jamahiriya	Gaddafi-era Libya	2011	Rapidly reduced to a rump state during the First Libyan Civil War, eventually holding only Sirte; dissolved after the killing of Muammar Gaddafi.
Syria	Ba'athist Syria	2024	Before the fall of Damascus on 8 December 2024, the remaining territory consisted of Damascus (encircled by rebels) and the western coastal Alawite-majority governorates of Latakia and Tartus.
Syria	Democratic Autonomous Administration of North and East Syria	2026	Following the January 2026 northeastern Syria offensive by Syrian government forces, up to 80% of the DAANES' territory was captured and subsequently ceded to the Syrian government as part of an integration agreement, culminating in the DAANES' full integration into the Syrian state on 20 August 2026.

== See also ==
- Rump state
- Government-in-exile
- List of historical unrecognized states and dependencies
- Succession of states
