= 486 (disambiguation) =

486 (four hundred and eighty-six) is the natural number following 485 and preceding 487; see 400 (number)#480s

486 may refer to a year:

- 486 BC
- 486 AD
- 1486

486 may also refer to:

- i486, a computer processor
- Am486, a computer processor
- 4-8-6, a proposed locomotive type
- RU-486, the trial designation of the abortifacient drug Mifepristone

== See also ==
- 486th (disambiguation)
