= 486th =

486th may refer to:

- 486th Air Expeditionary Wing, provisional United States Air Force unit assigned to the Air Combat Command
- 486th Bombardment Squadron, inactive United States Air Force unit
- 486th Fighter Squadron, inactive United States Air Force unit

== See also ==
- 486 (number)
- 486 (disambiguation)
- 486, the year 486 (CDLXXXVI) of the Julian calendar
- 486 BC
