= Emperor Severus =

Emperor Severus may refer to these Roman emperors:

- Marcus Didius [Severus] Julianus Augustus (133/137–193), Roman emperor in the Year of the Five Emperors (193)
- Lucius Septimius [Severus] Eusebes Pertinax Augustus (145–211), founding emperor (193–211) of the Severan dynasty
  - Marcus Aurelius [Severus] Antoninus Augustus (“Caracalla”) (188–217), second emperor (198–217) of the Severan dynasty
  - Marcus Opellius [Severus] Macrinus Augustus (165–218), Roman emperor (217–218), interlude of the Severan dynasty
  - Marcus Aurelius [Severus] Alexander Augustus (208–235), last emperor (222–235) of the Severan dynasty
- Flavius Valerius [Severus] Augustus (died 307), Western emperor (306–307)
- Flavius Libius [Severus] Serpentius Augustus (420–465), Western emperor (461–465)
