= Dagalaifus =

Dagalaifus or Dagalaiphus may refer to:

- Dagalaifus (magister equitum), Roman army officer, consul in 366
- Dagalaifus (consul 461), Roman politician, consul 461
- Areobindus Dagalaifus Areobindus, son of the latter, consul 506
