= Kingdom of the Romans =

The term Kingdom of the Romans, or in Latin Regnum Romanorum, may refer to:

- Roman Kingdom (753–509 BC), the earliest stage of the Roman state
- Kingdom of Soissons (AD 457–486), a sub-Roman rump state in northern Gaul
- the realm or office of the medieval King of the Romans
