= Apollonius (magister militum) =

General of the Eastern Roman Empire

- Occupation: General

Apollonius (Greek: Άπολλώνιος; fl. 443–451) was a general of the Eastern Roman Empire.

== Biography ==
Apollonius was a Pagan and well-educated. Before 448 he converted to Christianity. He received two letters by Theodoret.

He was magister militum praesentalis in the East at least since 443 and until 451, when he was sent to Attila as ambassador; in that occasion the King of the Huns sent Apollonius back as he had not brought the tribute Attila had been expecting.

Apollonius might be the Flavius Apollonius who was consul in 460.

== Bibliography ==
- Martindale, John R., ed. (1980). "Apollonius 3". The Prosopography of the Later Roman Empire: Volume II, AD 395–527. Cambridge: Cambridge University Press. p. 121. ISBN 0-521-20159-4.
