= Apollonius (consul 460) =

Apollonius (Greek: Άπολλώνιος; floruit 460) was an Eastern Roman consul in 460 AD.

He could be identified with that Apollonius who was praetorian prefect of the East in 442–443, or with that Apollonius who was magister militum in 443–451.

== Bibliography ==
- Martindale, John R., ed. (1980). "Apollonius 4". The Prosopography of the Later Roman Empire: Volume II, AD 395–527. Cambridge: Cambridge University Press. p. 121. ISBN 0-521-20159-4.

Political offices
Preceded by Patricius; Ricimer	Roman consul 460 with Magnus	Succeeded by Dagalaifus; Severinus
