= Vase of Soissons =

Semi-legendary French sacred vase

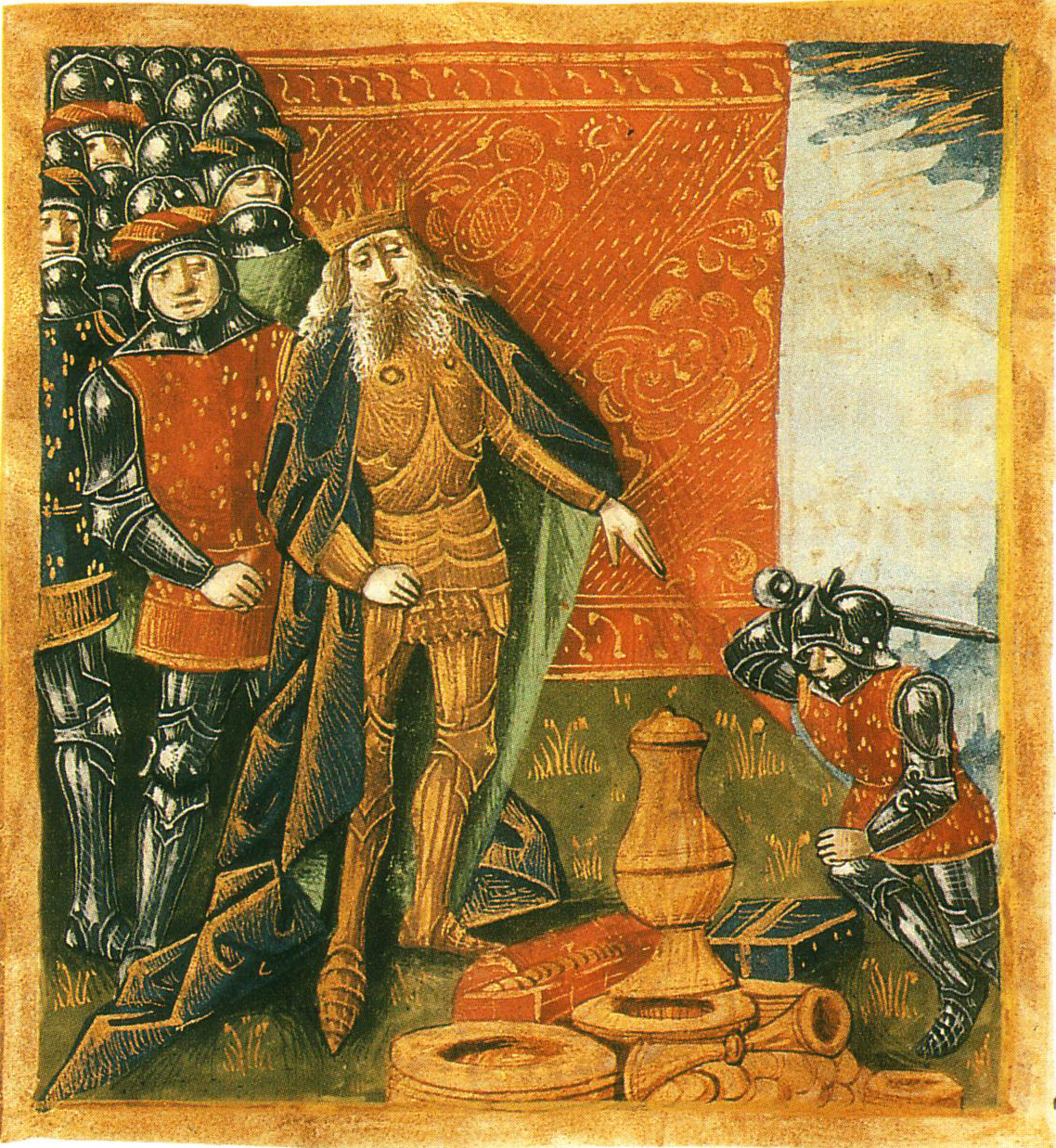

The Vase of Soissons was a semi-legendary sacred vase, probably in precious metal or a hardstone carving rather than pottery (though the material is not specified), which was kept in a cathedral in the Kingdom of Soissons during Late Antiquity. The existence and fate of the vase are known from Gregory of Tours (ca. 538–594), a Gallo-Roman historian and bishop. Because Gregory wrote his account more than a century after the vase was said to have been destroyed, it is difficult if not impossible to distinguish myth from history.

== The fate of the Vase of Soissons ==
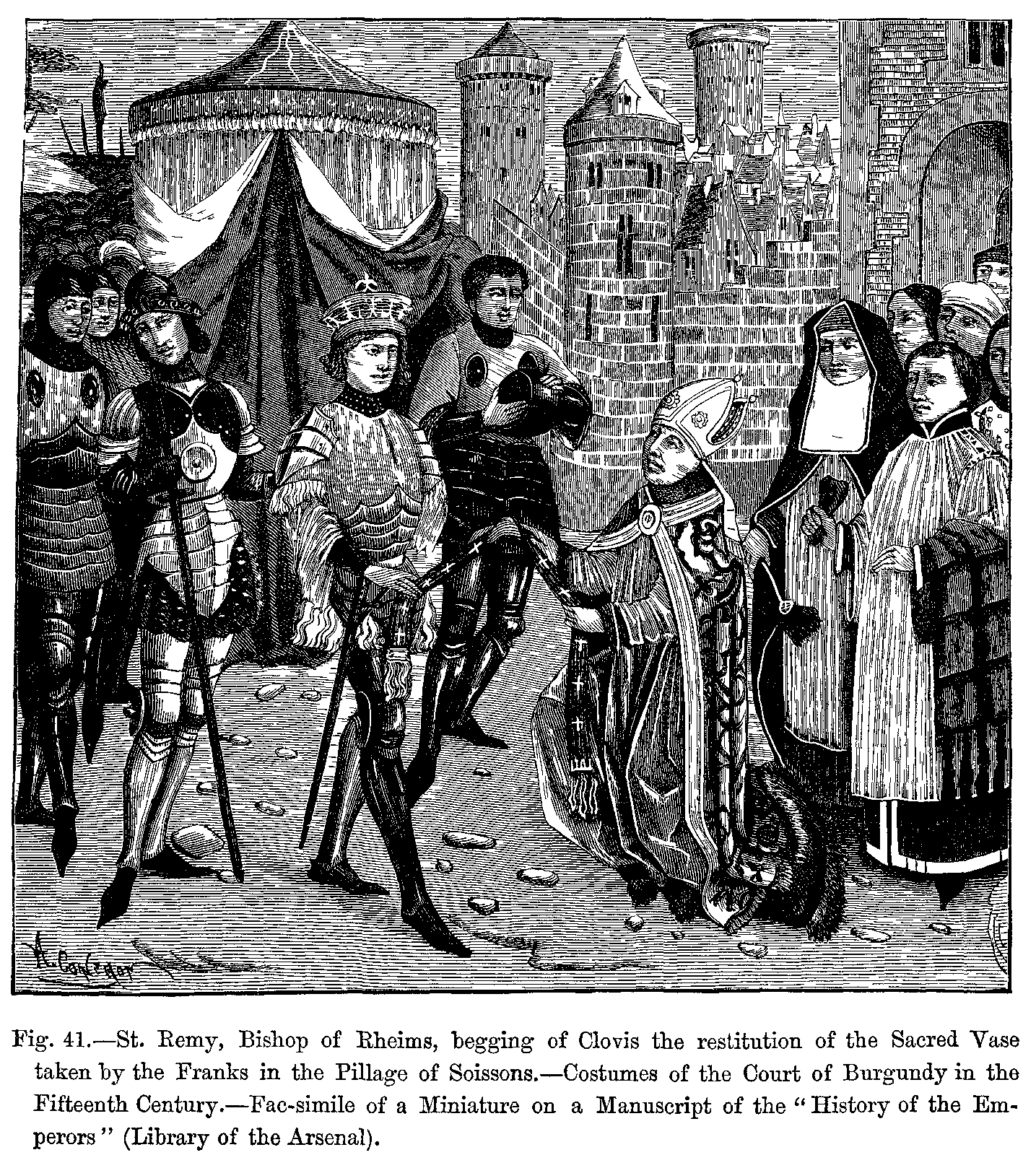
Drawing, after a fifteenth-century miniature, of Saint Remigius, bishop of Reims, begging Clovis to return the vase.

According to Gregory, the vase was of marvelous size and beauty and was stolen (together with other holy ornaments) from a church in the pillage that followed the Battle of Soissons of 486, a battle won by the Frankish king Clovis I, who at that time had not yet converted to Christianity.

Saint Remigius, the bishop of Reims, sent messengers to Clovis, begging that if the church might not recover any other of the holy vessels, at least this one might be restored. Clovis agreed to do so and therefore claimed the vase as his rightful part of the booty. One soldier disagreed and smashed the vase with his battle-axe. Clovis at first did not react to this and gave the broken vase to Remigius. A year later, however, he saw the soldier again, took the man's axe and threw it on the ground. The man bent down to pick up his axe, and Clovis smashed his skull with his own axe, commenting "Just as you did to the vase at Soissons!"

== In French culture ==
This anecdote was a staple of French primary school history textbooks during the Third Republic (1875–1940) and until the 1960s. The actual quote attributed to Clovis by Remigius was usually reformulated as a more catchy "Souviens-toi du vase de Soissons!" (Remember the vase of Soissons!)
