= 486 =

Calendar year

486 in various calendars
Gregorian calendar	486; CDLXXXVI
Ab urbe condita	1239
Assyrian calendar	5236
Balinese saka calendar	407–408
Bengali calendar	−108 – −107
Berber calendar	1436
Buddhist calendar	1030
Burmese calendar	−152
Byzantine calendar	5994–5995
Chinese calendar	乙丑年 (Wood Ox); 3183 or 2976 — to — 丙寅年 (Fire Tiger); 3184 or 2977
Coptic calendar	202–203
Discordian calendar	1652
Ethiopian calendar	478–479
Hebrew calendar	4246–4247
- Hindu calendars
Vikram Samvat	542–543
Shaka Samvat	407–408
Kali Yuga	3586–3587
Holocene calendar	10486
Iranian calendar	136 BP – 135 BP
Islamic calendar	140 BH – 139 BH
Javanese calendar	372–373
Julian calendar	486; CDLXXXVI
Korean calendar	2819
Minguo calendar	1426 before ROC 民前1426年
Nanakshahi calendar	−982
Seleucid era	797/798 AG
Thai solar calendar	1028–1029
Tibetan calendar	ཤིང་མོ་གླང་ལོ་ (female Wood-Ox); 612 or 231 or −541 — to — མེ་ཕོ་སྟག་ལོ་ (male Fire-Tiger); 613 or 232 or −540

The Frankish expansion

Year 486 (CDLXXXVI) was a common year starting on Wednesday of the Julian calendar. At the time, it was known as the Year of the Consulship of Basilius and Longinus (or, less frequently, year 1239 Ab urbe condita). The denomination 486 for this year has been used since the early medieval period, when the Anno Domini calendar era became the prevalent method in Europe for naming years.

== Events ==
=== By place ===
==== Europe ====
- Franco-Roman War of 486 – Battle of Soissons (Gaul): Frankish forces under King Clovis I defeat the Roman army of Syagrius. Roman rule under Syagrius ends. The land between the Somme and the Loire becomes a part of the Frankish Empire. Syagrius flees to the Visigoths (under King Alaric II), but Clovis threatens war, and he is handed over for execution.
- Clovis I establishes his new residence at Soissons. He appoints Ragnachar, Frankish petty king (regulus), as his deputy ruler.

=== By topic ===
==== Religion ====
- Persian Christians who follow Nestorianism gather in the second Council of Seleucia (modern Turkey).

== Deaths ==
- Syagrius, Roman official in Gaul (approximate date)
