= Federic (Visigoth general) =

Visigothic prince & general

Frederic (c. 420s – 463) was a Visigothic Prince and general in the closing period of the Western Roman Empire and the rise of the Visigoths.

== Biography ==
He was the third son of Theodoric I, serving as General mainly in Gaul under his father and later brothers Thorismund and Theodoric II. Frederic's ability as a field commander is unknown. He was third in line for the throne behind his older brothers Thorismund and Theodoric the Younger. It is unknown if he took part in the Battle of the Catalaunian Plains where his father died, nor is it known what he did during the short reign of his eldest brother Thorismund (451–453). But it is somewhat known that Frederic accompanied his brother Theodoric II on multiple campaigns possibly from 456 to 463 in Gaul and Hispania after Theodoric's accession to the throne in 453 as the Goths expanded their influence in the crumbling Western Roman Empire after the deaths of Aetius (21 September 454) and Valentinian III (16 March 455).

He is rarely mentioned in ancient sources. All that is recorded of him is that he took part in the Gothic war against the Magister Militum of Gaul Aegidius. It was here that he was killed in 463 at the Battle of Aurelianum. His death had serious repercussions in the Kingdom as Theodoric II would be murdered in early 466 by their youngest, but most ambitious brother Euric.

== Sources ==
- Thompson, E. A. The Goths in Spain. Oxford: Clarendon Press, 1969. ISBN 0-19-814271-4.
- Collins, Roger. Visigothic Spain, 409–711. Oxford: Blackwell Publishing, 2004. ISBN 0-631-18185-7.
- Collins, Roger. "King Leovigild and the Conversion of the Visigoths." Law, Regionalism and Culture in Early Medieval Spain. Variorum, 1992. ISBN 0-86078-308-1.
