= Rump state =

Remnant of a larger state

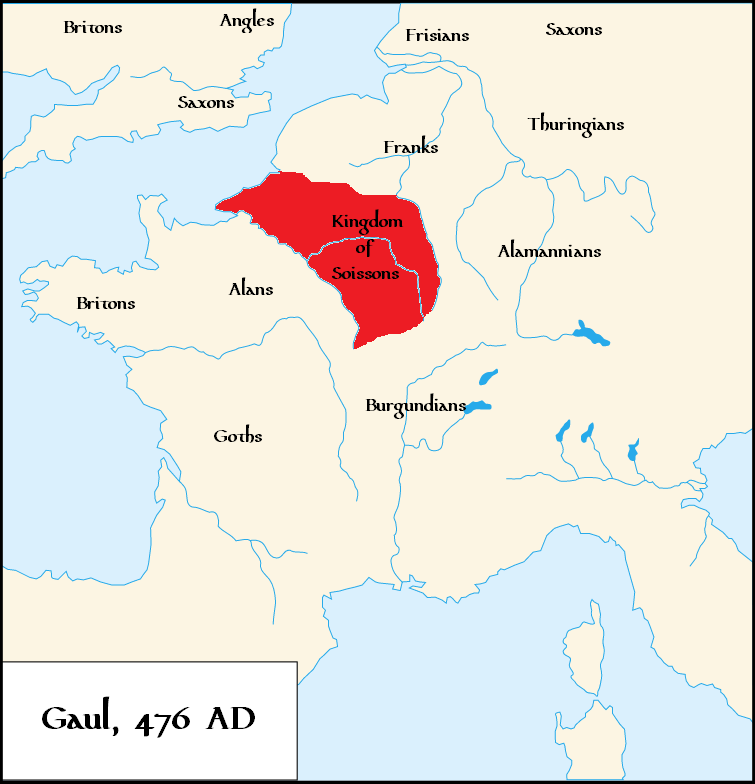
Possible extent of the "Kingdom of Soissons", a Roman rump state following the collapse of the Western Roman Empire.

A rump state is the remnant of a once much larger state that was reduced in the wake of annexation, occupation, secession, decolonization, a successful coup d'état, or revolution on part of its former territory. In the last case, a government stops short of going into exile because it controls parts of its remaining territories.

A rump state may face a higher likelihood of renewed conflict with the states formed from its former territories, depending on the manner of its reduction. There are numerous examples throughout history as well as contemporary ones, although the designation is sometimes disputed.

== Terminology and etymology ==
The term rump state dates back to usage of 'rump', meaning 'back-end' or 'hind quarters' in the mid-15th century. It then became used in political terms to describe the English 'Rump Parliament' from 1648 - 1653, which included only the remaining members after the "Pride's Purge". In this case using rump to denote "tail" or what remains.

Now the full term rump state is a political science term of art meaning "a state or country that is much smaller and less powerful than it used to be, after a period of war, political change".

== Definition ==
A rump state is the remnant of a formerly larger state, controlling only a portion of its former territory due to revolution, secession, or losses from war. It is not a government in exile, which controls none of its former territory.

There tends to be tension between the rump state and its former territories, making likeliness of violent conflict between them higher. Violent secessions are much more likely to produce subsequent fighting between the states compared to peaceful separations.

== Examples ==
Rump states have arisen throughout history. After the collapse of the Western Roman Empire in Gaul, the Kingdom of Soissons survived as a Roman rump state until it was conquered by the Franks in 486. After the Jin dynasty assumed control over northern China in 1127, the Southern Song persisted as a rump state of the Northern Song dynasty. Vatican City can be considered a rump state of the Papal States, confined to the Vatican hill after the capture of Rome in 1870 and established as an independent state by the Lateran Treaty of 1929. Taiwan is the rump state of the Republic of China left over after the retreat from the mainland. The current status of Taiwan is disputed and varies based on the observer's perspective.

== See also ==
- List of rump states
- Exclusive mandate
- Feudal fragmentation
- Government-in-exile
- List of historical unrecognized states and dependencies
- Power vacuum
- Puppet state
- Rival government
- Rump Parliament – English parliament 1648–1653
- Secession
- Separatism
- Succession of states
