= Apollonius (praetorian prefect) =

Apollonius (Greek: Άπολλώνιος; floruit 436–451) was a politician of the Eastern Roman Empire.

He was comes sacrarum largitionum in 436, then Praetorian prefect of the East from August 21, 442 to May 22, 443. Apollonius attended the Council of Chalcedon in 451.

He might be the Apollonius who was consul in 460.

== Bibliography ==
- Martindale, John R., ed. (1980). "Apollonius 2". The Prosopography of the Later Roman Empire: Volume II, AD 395–527. Cambridge: Cambridge University Press. p. 121. ISBN 0-521-20159-4.
