= Patricius (Caesar) =

Eastern Roman caesar

- Caesar: c. 470–471
- Coronation: c. 470
- Augustus: Leo I
- Spouse: Leontia (daughter of Leo I) annulled c. 471
- Dynasty: Leonid (by marriage)
- Father: Aspar (magister militum)
- Religion: Arian Christianity

Patricius (Greek: Πατρίκιος, romanized: Patrikios; floruit 459–471) was an Eastern Roman caesar, the son of the powerful general Aspar, who for almost two decades was the effective power behind the throne of the Eastern Roman Empire. Of mixed Roman and barbarian origin, Patricius was destined for the imperial throne by his father. He rose to the rank of caesar under Emperor Leo I, before his father's murder in 471 led to his own downfall and possibly death.

== Biography ==
Patricius was the third son of Aspar, the Alan magister militum of Emperor Leo I, and like his father—and most of the Germanic peoples—he was an Arian.

The name "Patricius", of ostentatious Roman origin, suggests that the father had plans for him, up to the imperial throne. Patricius was appointed consul in 459 by the Eastern court.

In 470, in an episode of the struggle for power between Aspar and the Isaurian general Zeno, Aspar persuaded the Emperor to appoint Patricius as caesar and give him in marriage his daughter Leontia. However, the clergy and people of Constantinople believed an Arian was not eligible to become an Emperor, and on hearing of the appointment riots broke out in the city hippodrome, led by the head of the Sleepless Monks, Marcellus. Aspar and Leo had to promise to the bishops that Patricius would convert to Chalcedonian Orthodoxy before becoming Emperor, and that he would marry Leontia only after his conversion.

No coins of Patricius as caesar were issued, and his only act in office was a trip to Alexandria, where he was welcomed with all the honours attributed to a caesar.

In 471 an imperial conspiracy caused the death of Aspar and of his eldest son Ardabur: it is possible that Patricius also was killed on this occasion, although some sources report that he recovered from his wounds; in any case, after this episode, Patricius disappears from the sources. The marriage with Leontia was annulled, and later she married Marcian.

== Bibliography ==
- Alemany, Agustí (2000). Sources on the Alans: A Critical Compilation. Brill. ISBN 90-04-11442-4.p. 114
- Amory, Patrick (1997). People and Identity in Ostrogothic Italy, 489-554. Cambridge University Press. ISBN 0-521-52635-3. pp. 284, 288
- Bury, John B. (1958) [1923]. "X.1 Leo I (A.D. 457‑474)", in History of the Later Roman Empire. Dover Books. pp. 389–395
- Bagnall, Roger S.; Cameron, Alan; Schwartz, Seth R.; Worp, Klaas A. (1987). Consuls of the Later Roman Empire. Philological Monographs No. 36. American Philological Association. ISBN 1-55540-099-X.
- Thiele, Andreas (1994). Erzählende genealogische Stammtafeln zur europäischen Geschichte Band III Europäische Kaiser-, Königs- und Fürstenhäuser Ergänzungsband, R.G. Fischer Verlag. Tafel 490
- Martindale, John R., ed. (1980). "Iulius Patricius 15". The Prosopography of the Later Roman Empire: Volume II, AD 395–527. Cambridge: Cambridge University Press. pp. 842–843. ISBN 0-521-20159-4.
- Williams, Stephen (1999). The Rome That Did Not Fall: the survival of the East in the fifth century. Routledge, ISBN 0-415-15403-0. p. 180.

Political offices
Preceded by Julius Majorianus Augustus, Leo Augustus	Roman consul 459 with Ricimer	Succeeded by Magnus, Apollonius
