= Magnus (consul 460) =

Gallo-Roman senator

Magnus (died 475 AD) was a Roman senator of Narbonne (then Narbo). He was appointed Roman consul in 460 by the Western emperor Majorian, at the same time Apollonius served in the East. Magnus also served as praetorian prefect of Gaul around the same time.

== Family ==
Magnus was the grandson of Agricola, consul in 421 and father of Emperor Avitus. According to one reconstruction, his father might have been the son of Ennodius, proconsul of Africa. He might have been Felix, consul in 428, who married Padusia and was allegedly an ancestor of Felix, consul in 511.

He was the father of:

- Magnus Felix, praetorian prefect of Gaul in 469, married to Attica;
- Araneola, married to Polemius between 460 and 469.
- Probus, a Roman senator

== Sources and references ==
- Martindale, John R., ed. (1980). The Prosopography of the Later Roman Empire: Volume II, AD 395–527. Cambridge: Cambridge University Press. ISBN 0-521-20159-4.
- Christian Settipani (2000). Continuité gentilice et continuité familiale dans les familles sénatoriales romaines à l'époque impériale. p. 597, Addenda I-III, p. 11. ISBN 9781900934022.
- Sidonius Apollinaris, The Letters of Sidonius (Oxford: Clarendon, 1915), pp. clx-clxxxiii

Preceded by Patricius and Ricimer	Roman consul 460, with Apollonius	Succeeded by Dagalaifus and Severinus
