= Roman civil war of 461 =

Internal conflict of the Western Roman Empire

Roman Civil War of 461
- Part of Fall of the Western Roman Empire
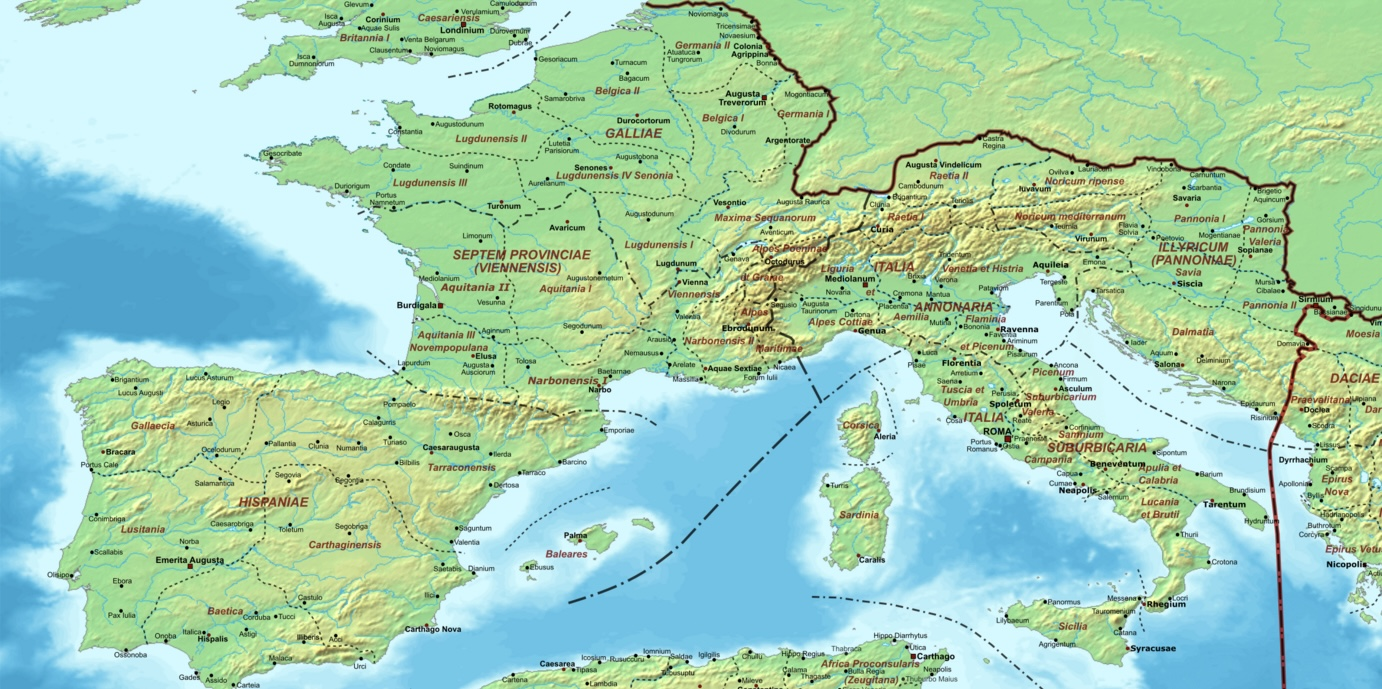
Date	461-465
Location	Italy, Gaul, Hispania
Result	Further fragmentation of the Western Roman Empire

Commanders and leaders
Ricimer; Agrippinus; Arborius	Aegidius; Marcellinus; Nepotianus

The Roman Civil War of 461 was an internal conflict within the Western Roman Empire that arose from a coup by the influential general Ricimer. As a result, Emperor Majorian was deposed. Because Ricimer was of Germanic origin, he was not eligible for the throne. Instead, he used his position to appoint a new emperor, favorable to him. These events caused an uprising by several generals.

== Background ==
In 456, Ricimer and Majorian had together deposed emperor Avitus. Ricimer was given supreme command of the army, while Majorian took over the position of emperor. However, their cooperation deteriorated over time, especially when Majorian began to take an increasingly independent course.

Ricimer feared that Majorian would undermine his power by strengthening central authority and building a network of loyal officers, including Aegidius and Nepotianus. His fear increased when Majorian was initially successful. However, the failure of Majorian African campaign against the Vandals in 460 gave Ricimer the opportunity to strike. He had Majorian captured and executed shortly afterwards in August 461. He then appointed Libius Severus as emperor, but he was neither recognized by the East Roman court nor by a number of influential West Roman generals.

== Outbreak of the conflict ==
Ricimer's position came under pressure when several generals openly opposed the new regime. These men were loyal supporters of Majorian and refused to recognize Libius Severus. Still, Ricimer managed to keep his opponents under control by fighting them separately and preventing their mutual cooperation.

As the son of a Suevish father and Visigothic mother, Ricimer had good relations with Germanic foederati such as the Burgundians and Goths. He cleverly used their military support to stand out to his domestic enemies.

=== The Generals ===
Three generals played an important role in the uprising against Ricimer:

- Aegidius, magister militum per Gallas, commander of the imperial army in Gaul. He had a considerable army stationed in the region around Paris.
- Marcellinus, magister militum in Dalmatia, was during Ricimer's seizure of power in Sicily, where he operated against the Vandals.
- Nepotianus, comes et magister utriusque militiae, led a mixed Roman-Gothic army in Hispania. He was linked to Marcellinus through his marriage.

=== Course of the conflict ===
In Italy, Ricimer remained the actual ruler, although his emperor, Libius Severus, was weak and not widely recognized. The greatest danger came from Aegidius, who had one of the strongest armies of the West Roman Empire. Majorian had left most of his troops with him in Gaul. This army, just like the Italian army, was the most redoubtable force in the Western Roman Empire. Aegidius tried to descend from the north to Italy. However, his progress was hampered by the Burgundian rex Gundioc, who joined the new regime in Ravenna. In addition, Agrippinus, a follower of Ricimer, transferred the strategic city Narbonne to the Aquitan Goths, who in exchange for this went to war against Aegidius. In 463 Aegdius managed to defeat them at Orleans. He retained independent in northern Gaul until his death in 464. Ricimer would have had to make huge concessions for this, including ceding territory and appointing foederati to high posts. Gundioc was appointed magister militum par Gallas.

The least danger came from Nepotianus who was still in Hispania after Majorianus' failed attack on the Vandals. On order of the Gothic rex Theodoric II, who acted on behalf of Ricimer, his Gothic troops retreated to Gaul. As a result, Nepotian was isolated and replaced by Arborius. After these events, he left Hispania and then disappeared from the sources, which may indicate his death or elimination during or shortly after the civil war.

Marcellinus was the last strong opponent. After an attempt by Ricimer to buy his soldiers, he was forced to leave Sicily. He returned to Dalmatia and continued to position himself independently. He built a fleet and threatened the coasts of Italy. Over time (465), he joined the authority of the Eastern Roman emperor and was no longer a threat for Ricimer.

== After-effects and outcome ==
The civil war did not end with a decisive victory for both parties, but marked a further disintegration of the Western Roman authority. Although Ricimer managed to maintain his dominant position in Italy, his influence beyond was limited. After the death of Aegidius in 464, the main threat disappeared from Gaul. Marcellinus was murdered in 468 during an expedition against the Vandals – possibly on behalf of Ricimer. Nevertheless, the central authority in Italy regained no control over the apostate areas and the foederati retained the freedoms they had obtained during the conflict. The rebellious generals – Aegidius, Marcellinus and Nepotianus – symbolize the emerging regional militarism, which undermined the last foundations of the central authority. This process contributed directly to the eventual downfall of the Western Roman Empire in 476.

== See also ==
- Roman civil war of 456
- Gothic War (457–458)
- Battle of Orleans (463)

== Sources ==
- Fasti Vindobonnenses Priores, framentarically handed down Roman list of official events
- Hydatius, Chronicles
- Priscus
- Chronica Gallica of 511
- Gregory of Tours, Historia Francorum

== Bibliography used in the article ==
- O'Flynn, John Michael (1983). "Ricimer, the Emperor Maker". Generalissimos of the Western Roman Empire. University of Alberta.
- Bury, J. B. (1923). "The War with the Vandals (AD 461–468)". History of the Later Roman Empire. Macmillan & Co.
- Wijnendaele, Jeroen W.P. (2024). De wereld van Clovis, de val van Rome en de geboorte van het westen [The World of Clovis, the Fall of Rome and the Birth of the West] (in Dutch). Ertsberg. ISBN 9789464984064.
