= Agrippinus (magister militum) =

General of the Western Roman Empire

- Military career
- Allegiance: Western Roman Empire
- Rank: General
- Commands: Gaul

Agrippinus (floruit 451–462) was a general of the Western Roman Empire, Magister militum per Gallias under emperors Valentinian III, Petronius Maximus, Avitus and Libius Severus.

== Biography ==
Agrippinus was a native of Gaul; Ralph Mathisen points out his attested ties are concentrated in the eastern part of Lugdunensis; "writers from no other area have anything good to say about him" Mathisen adds in parentheses. He was appointed Comes and later Magister militum per Gallias; Hydatius records that, as a comes, he received a letter from Euphronius, bishop of Autun describing a comet seen at Easter, 451. The Vita Aniani records that when he was wounded, Anianus, Bishop of Aurelianum miraculously healed him; as a show of gratitude, Agrippinus freed all his prisoners.

When Avitus was deposed by Majorian in 456, Majorian replaced Agrippinus with Aegidius as comes; Aegidius then accused his predecessor of various kinds of treachery. Accompanied by Lupicinus, abbot of the monastery of St. Claude, Agrippinus was sent to Rome where he was tried and sentenced to death without the possibility to appeal to the Emperor or to the Senate. According to the Vita Lupicini, Agrippinus escaped and took refuge in the church of St. Peter. Later he was pardoned by the Emperor, with the abbot Lupicinus' help, and was sent back to Gaul "exalted with honors." It is possible that Agrippinus, who was considered an enemy by Majorian, was restored in power by one of his successors, either Libius Severus or the man behind the throne, Ricimer, who had killed Majorian and put Severus on the throne.

As Aegidius had not recognised Severus' authority, the new Emperor restored Agrippinus as comes (461 or 462). Once invested with the insignia of office, Agrippinus gave the city of Narbonne to the Visigoths. Hugh Elton suggests this cession was a bribe from the Emperor Severus to encourage the Visigoths to war against Agrippinus' old rival Aegidius.

== See also ==
- Roman civil war of 456
- Roman civil war of 461

== Notes ==
=== Further reading ===
- Martindale, John R., ed. (1980). "Agrippinus". The Prosopography of the Later Roman Empire: Volume II, AD 395–527. Cambridge: Cambridge University Press. pp. 37–38. ISBN 0-521-20159-4.
