= Severinus (consul 461) =

Flavius Severinus (fl. 456–461) was a Senator and a politician of the Western Roman Empire.

== Life ==
He probably was of Italian origin, as attested by an inscription, and held a noteworthy position during the 450s. F. Lotter has speculated that he may be identical to Saint Severinus of Noricum, whose life before he arrived in Noricum is unknown.

As told by Sidonius Apollinaris, Severinus held some offices under Emperor Avitus (455–456), then participated in Emperor Majorian's campaign in Gaul against the Visigoths (458). As Majorian wanted to please the aristocracy of both Italy and Gaul, he chose Severinus as consul for 461. At a banquet at Arelate, described by Sidonius, Severinus was the second-most important person, after the emperor.

== Bibliography ==
- Martindale, John R., ed. (1980). "Fl. Severinus 5". The Prosopography of the Later Roman Empire: Volume II, AD 395–527. Cambridge: Cambridge University Press. p. 1001. ISBN 0-521-20159-4.
- Mathisen, Ralph W., "Julius Valerius Maiorianus (18 February/28 December 457 - 2/7 August 461)", De Imperatoribus Romanis.

== Notes ==
Political offices
Preceded by Magnus; Apollonius	Roman consul 461 with Dagalaifus	Succeeded by Libius Severus Augustus; Leo Augustus II
