= Kingdom of Soissons =

5th century Kingdom of Romans in Soissons

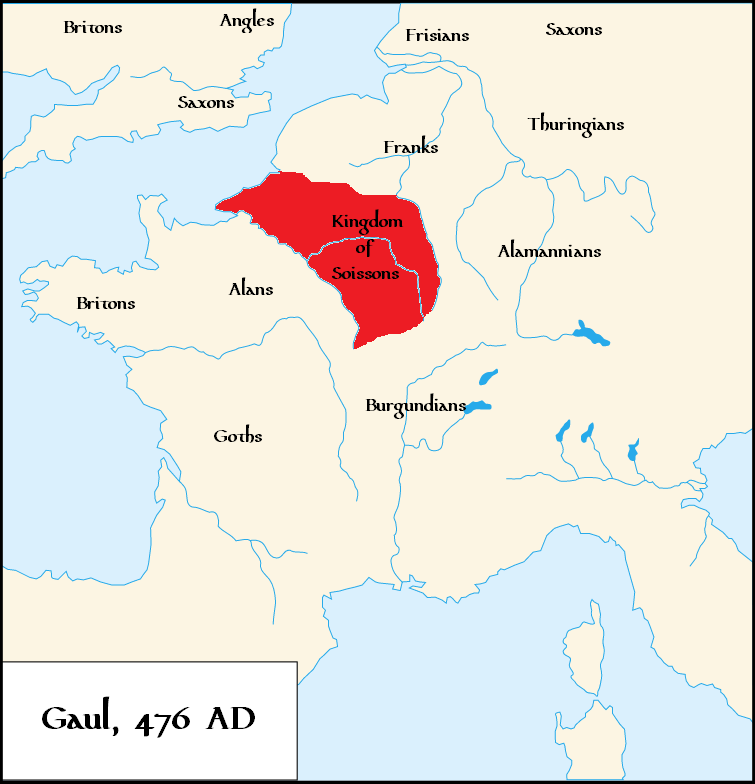
Possible extent of the "Kingdom of Soissons" in 476.

The Kingdom of Soissons is the name given by modern scholars to the fifth-century "kingdom" of Romans ruled by Syagrius, which was based in Soissons in what is now northern France. There is disagreement among scholars as to both its extent, how long it existed, and whether it was considered a kingdom by contemporaries. In one of the only mentions of him, Syagrius was referred to as "king of the Romans" (Latin: rex Romanorum) by the 6th-century historian Gregory of Tours, and both he and the population he ruled are generally understood to have been Gallo-Roman.

In 486, Syagrius lost the Battle of Soissons to the Frankish king Clovis I and the domain was thereafter under the control of the Franks. Syagrius fled to Toulouse and the protection of Alaric II, the Visigothic king who ruled the Roman population in the southwest of Gaul. After receiving threats from Clovis, Alaric handed him over, and he was eventually killed secretly while in Frankish captivity.

Aegidius, the father of Syagrius mentioned by Gregory, had been a Gallo-Roman military commander who died in the autumn of 465. He had been appointed to be magister militum in Gaul by either Avitus or Majorian in 456-457.

== The nature of the "kingdom" ==
Very little is known about the realm ruled by Syagrius, resulting in considerable debates among historians about the structure and nature of the Kingdom of Soissons. A maximalist approach views it as a state controlling most of northern Gaul while many scholars, for example historian Edward James think that Syagrius was little more than a "Count of Soissons" who controlled a small area, and whose importance had been exaggerated by Gregory of Tours.

It is uncertain whether the title of king was used by Syagrius himself or was applied to him by the barbarians surrounding his realm, in a similar way to how they referred to their own leaders as kings.

== Aegidius, the father of Syagrius ==
Gregory of Tours said that in the fifth year of Clovis, Syagrius had the seat of his kingdom in Soissons which his father Aegidius had somehow held, although the nature of this holding is not defined. MacGeorge thinks it likely that he had family connections and wealth in the area.

In about 457 the new emperor Majorian (reigned 457-461) appointed Aegidius, the father of Syagrius, to be magister militum of Roman Gaul. Majorian and Aegidius had served together in Gaul under Aëtius. Majorian was murdered in 461 and Aegidius refused to recognize the new emperor Libius Severus (reigned 461-465), even threatening to invade Italy. Instead, he was attacked by the Visigoths, fighting on behalf of Rome. On behalf of the new emperor, another Gallo-Roman named Count Agrippinus, who was apparently the magister militum before Aegidius, surrendered control of Narbonne on the Mediterranean coast to the Visigoths. Aegidius was now apparently restricted to the north of Gaul, and won the a battle at Orleans against the Visigoths in 463, where he killed Frederic the king's brother.

In 465 Aegidius sent an embassy to the Kingdom of the Vandals in North Africa, perhaps as potential allies. As reported by Hydatius, Aegidius died either by poison or in an ambush in the autumn of that year. For about four years Aegidius was therefore in a position of power, but historians conventionally think that Syagrius held a position of power for a longer period.

== Syagrius ==
Historians such as James are sceptical about the relative importance of Syagrius in the period of the death of Aegidius. There is evidence that Childeric was more important in the same regions. When the Frank Clovis took power over this whole region there is a record of him a congratulatory message from Saint Remigius, the bishop of the Reims, for taking over the administration of the Roman province of Belgica II which his forebears had held. "Belgica II" is the name of the Roman province which contained not only Reims and Soissons, but also Tournai where Childeric was buried. There were also Alans and Britons and Saxons as well as other Roman administrators using various titles, such as Count Arbogast in Trier. In a letter to him, Sidonius Apollinaris said that the Roman speech had been wiped out in the Belgica and Germania provinces of northern Gaul.

After Anthemius became emperor in 467 the central government once again took a more effective interest in trying to limit Gothic dominance in Gaul, and in about 469/470 it appears to have been Childeric and a Roman named Count Paul who led Roman and Frankish forces in the Loire region against Visigothic attacks, which were apparently coordinated with Saxon attacks coming up the river. Anthemius was murdered in 472.

In 476 Odoacer dethroned Romulus Augustulus, the last sitting emperor of the Western Roman Empire, in Italy. A contemporary historian in the Eastern Roman Empire, Candidus Isaurus, reported that the Gauls revolted and sent an embassy to the Eastern emperor Zeno, who chose Odoacer instead. MacGeorge has argued that this failed embassy could "just conceivably" have been connected to Syagrius, because the south of Roman Gaul was administered by the kingdoms of the Visigoths and Burgundians and it is "difficult to imagine" anyone other than Syagrius making this contact. Childeric died about 481, and his son Clovis I became the Frankish king. According to Gregory of Tours, Syagrius the son of Aegidius and "King of the Romans", had his seat at Soissons (which his father had once possessed) in the fifth year of the reign of Clovis. MacGeorge dates this to 485/486, and Martindale to 486/487.

Clovis made continual war against Syagrius, and in the end took over all his territory. Syagrius lost the final Battle of Soissons in 486; many historians consider this Clovis' greatest victory. Syagrius fled to the Visigothic king Alaric II, but the Franks threatened war if Syagrius were not surrendered to them. Syagrius was sent back to Clovis, who had him executed in 486 or 487.

Clovis I ruled the Franks until his death in 511. When he died, the Frankish realm was divided into four kingdoms, one for each of his sons. Clothar I received a portion centred in Soissons, where he had been born a decade after Syagrius' death. Clothar survived all his brothers and their families—in one case by murdering the sons of a deceased brother—and eventually reunited the realm in 555.

When Clothar died in 561, the Frankish realm was divided into three kingdoms, one for each son. The portions centred around Soissons and Paris eventually developed into the kingdom of Neustria, which remained one of the key divisions of the Frankish realm.

== Army ==
When Aegidius was appointed magister militum of Gaul by Emperor Majorian, he took control of the remaining Roman troops in Gaul. According to Eastern Roman writer Priscus, Aegidius and Syagrius both commanded a "large force". At one point, Aegidius and/or Syagrius even threatened the Western Roman Empire with an invasion of Italy if the empire did not grant their requests. Their forces also offered effective resistance to the power of the Visigoth Kingdom, to the south and west of Soissons. MacGeorge (2002) estimates that Syagrius had around 6,000 troops at his disposal as of 486.

== See also ==
- Vase of Soissons

== Cited works ==
- James, Edward (1988). The Franks. The Peoples of Europe. Oxford, UK; Cambridge, Massachusetts: Basil Blackwell. ISBN 0-631-17936-4.
- MacGeorge, Penny (2002). Late Roman Warlords. Oxford University Press. ISBN 0-19-925244-0.
- Martindale, John R., ed. (1980). The Prosopography of the Later Roman Empire: Volume II, AD 395–527. Cambridge: Cambridge University Press. ISBN 0-521-20159-4.
