= Dagalaifus (consul 461) =

East Roman politician

Flavius Dagalaifus or Dagalaiphus (fl. 461–475) was a politician of the Eastern Roman Empire.

The Son of Areobindus (consul in 434), Dagalaifus married Godisthea, the daughter of Ardabur (consul in 447) and granddaughter of Aspar (consul in 434 and colleague of Areobindus). They had a son, the consul of 506, Areobindus Dagalaifus Areobindus, who married the daughter of the Western Roman Emperor Olybrius.

In 461, he was consul in the East. During the reign of Basiliscus (475–476), Dagalaifus, attested by sources as Patricius, received in his home in Constantinople Daniel the Stylite, to allow him to rest during a demonstration against the Emperor.

== Bibliography ==
- Martindale, John R., ed. (1980). "Fl. Dagalaiphus 2". The Prosopography of the Later Roman Empire: Volume II, AD 395–527. Cambridge: Cambridge University Press. pp. 340–341. ISBN 0-521-20159-4.

| Preceded by Magnus; Apollonius | Roman consul 461 with Severinus | Succeeded by Libius Severus Augustus; Leo Augustus II |
