= 486 BC =

486 BC in various calendars
- Gregorian calendar: 486 BC; CDLXXXVI BC
- Ab urbe condita: 268
- Ancient Egypt era: XXVII dynasty, 40
- Pharaoh: Darius I of Persia, 36
- Ancient Greek Olympiad (summer): 73rd Olympiad, year 3
- Assyrian calendar: 4265
- Balinese saka calendar: N/A
- Bengali calendar: −1079 – −1078
- Berber calendar: 465
- Buddhist calendar: 59
- Burmese calendar: −1123
- Byzantine calendar: 5023–5024
- Chinese calendar: 甲寅年 (Wood Tiger); 2212 or 2005 — to — 乙卯年 (Wood Rabbit); 2213 or 2006
- Coptic calendar: −769 – −768
- Discordian calendar: 681
- Ethiopian calendar: −493 – −492
- Hebrew calendar: 3275–3276
- Hindu calendars
- Vikram Samvat: −429 – −428
- Shaka Samvat: N/A
- Kali Yuga: 2615–2616
- Holocene calendar: 9515
- Iranian calendar: 1107 BP – 1106 BP
- Islamic calendar: 1141 BH – 1140 BH
- Javanese calendar: N/A
- Julian calendar: N/A
- Korean calendar: 1848
- Minguo calendar: 2397 before ROC 民前2397年
- Nanakshahi calendar: −1953
- Thai solar calendar: 57–58
- Tibetan calendar: ཤིང་ཕོ་སྟག་ལོ་ (male Wood-Tiger) −359 or −740 or −1512 — to — ཤིང་མོ་ཡོས་ལོ་ (female Wood-Hare) −358 or −739 or −1511

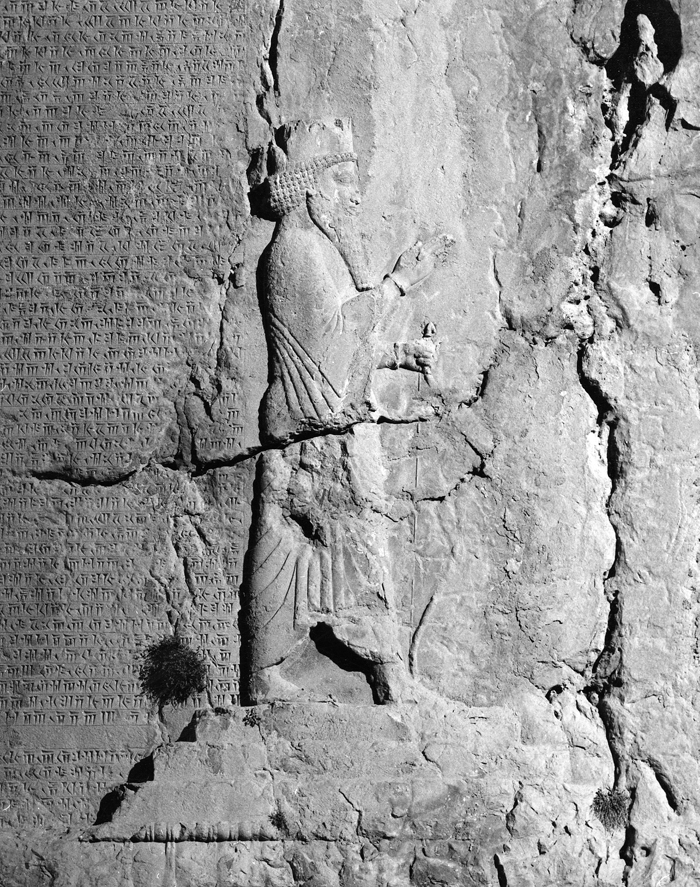
Relief of king Darius I (550–486 BCE)

Year 486 BC was a year of the pre-Julian Roman calendar. At the time, it was known as the Year of the Consulship of Viscellinus and Rutilus (or, less frequently, year 268 Ab urbe condita). The denomination 486 BC for this year has been used since the early medieval period, when the Anno Domini calendar era became the prevalent method in Europe for naming years.

== Events ==
=== By place ===
==== Persian Empire ====
- Egypt revolts against Persian rule upon the death of king Darius I. The revolts, probably led by Libyans of the western Delta, are crushed the next year by Xerxes, who reduces Egypt to the status of a conquered province.

==== Roman Republic ====
- Rome enters into a new treaty with the Hernici.
- During his third consulate, the Roman consul Spurius Cassius Vecellinus proposes an agrarian law to assist needy plebeians. The proposal is vehemently opposed by the patricians including the other consul Proculus Verginius Tricostus Rutilus, and the plebs turn against the patricians. In the following year Cassius is condemned and executed for high treason.

==== China ====
- The first part of the Grand Canal of China is built during the reign of King Fuchai of Wu. It links the Yangtze River with the Huai River, and is a measure to ship ample amount of supplies north for intended wars with the northern states of Song and Lu.

=== By topic ===
==== Art ====
- The construction of a relief in the Apadana, a ceremonial complex at Persepolis, is finished. It shows Darius and Xerxes receiving tribute.

== Deaths ==
- Darius I, king of the Persian Achaemenid Empire (b. 550 BCE)
- Spurius Cassius Vecellinus, Roman consul (executed)
