= Aegidius =

King of Soissons (r. 461–464/65) in the Western Roman Empire

- Died: 464/465 AD
- Children: Syagrius
- Military career
- Allegiance: Western Roman Empire; Soisson; Franks? ("Salian")
- Service: 458–461 AD (Western Roman Empire); 461–464/465 AD ("in the name of" Rome)
- Rank: Magister militum per Gallias; Ruler of Soissons "King" of Franks
- Conflicts: Battle of Arelate; Roman civil war of 461; Battle of Orléans (463)

Aegidius or Egidius (died 464/5) was a 5th-century Gallo-Roman who held the Roman title of "count" (comes), and was assigned as the imperial magister militum (military commander) of Gaul from 456/7 until the death of the emperor Majorian in 461. After this, when he did not accept the new emperor Libius Severus, he continued to fight "in the name of Rome", to quote a contemporary chronicler, north of the Loire river, in what is now northern France. He used local Roman and Frankish troops, led by Childeric. The region was never recovered by Rome, and in the following generation Childeric's son Clovis, united it under Frankish rule, after having defeated Syagrius, the son of Aegidius.

As Roman military commander for Gaul under Majorian, Aegidius was besieged by the Visigoths in Arles, probably in 458/9, where he helped achieve an important victory. He also launched major accusations against his predecessor Agrippinus for planning to give away parts of the empire to barbarians.

After the death of Majorian and his rebellion in 461, Aegidius became a threat to the regime of Ricimer in Italy, but never launched an invasion because of the conflict he had with the Aquitanian Goths, who were at this time allies of the new emperor. He probably continued to pledge allegiance to the Eastern Roman emperor Leo I. After successfully defending the Loire from attacks by the Visigoths, Aegidius was killed, in late 464, or possibly 465.

After his death his son Syagrius, who was described as a "King of Romans" (Latin: rex romanorum) by the 6th century writer Gregory of Tours, based himself in Soissons, ruling a lordship referred to by modern scholars as the Kingdom of Soissons. Gregory mentioned that Aegidius his father had held Soissons before him, perhaps indicating a family connection to the region.

== Background ==
According to Priscus of Panium, Aegidius was born in Gaul. He is likely to have been a member of an old aristocratic family. Modern scholars propose that he was part of a family known today as the Syagrii, based upon the name of his son, Syagrius. Although there is no strong evidence of this, it is likely.

Priscus also mentioned that Aegidius served under Aetius during the latter's time as magister militum (master of soldiers) of the Western Roman Empire. Avitus and Majorian, who were western emperors during the lifetime of Aegidius, were both similarly of Gallo-Roman origin, and had also served under Aëtius. Priscus reports that Aegidius had considerable influence with Majorian. Given his background it is speculated that Aegidius may have had a connection or alliance to either Avitus, who reigned until 456, or Majorian, who reigned after him. Gregory Tours claimed that he was assigned as magister militum after Majorian became emperor, and many scholars think it happened around 458. The situation in Gaul was sensitive as Avitus had been ejected by force by Ricimer and Majorian, and he had allies among the senators in Lyon. During his time new arrangements had been made with the Burgundians, giving them increased control over territory and a security role even in the city.

The Ripuarian Franks conquered Cologne and Trier from the Romans in about 457.

== Possible siege at Arles ==
Although not named, Aegidius may have already been with Majorian when he entered Gaul and ejected "barbarians" stationed in Lyon, who were probably Burgundians. Many historians think this was at Arles, because Paulinus of Périgueux, in a collection of miracles attributed to Saint Martin, described Aegidius leading the Roman forces in a city under siege on the Rhone, using a pontoon bridge. In fact the date and place is uncertain. The force besieging them were Goths of Aquitania under King Theodoric II in 456–459.

In any case, Majorian made peace with Theoderic in 459, after defeating him in battle somewhere.

== King of the Franks ==
According to a story reported by Gregory of Tours, Aegidius became a "king" of the Franks. According to this story the Frankish king Childeric, the father of Clovis, was excessively wanton and began to dishonour the daughters of his fellow Franks. They ejected him from his position and wanted to kill him, and so he escaped to "Thuringia" (a term which sometimes seems to represent the Tongeren region in this part of Gregory's work). He left an ally among the Franks to try to calm them and prepare the situation for his return. He and his friend agreed that he would receive a secret signal when the time was right, and Childeric went to stay with king Basinus and Basina his wife. According to Gregory, it was eight years before Childeric received this signal to return. When he left Thuringia, Basina left her husband to come with Childeric. Gregory narrates: "I know your worth," said she, "and that you are very strong, and therefore I have come to Hve with you. For let me tell you that if I had known of anyone more worthy than you in parts beyond the sea I should certainly have sought to live with him."

Two later works which derived much of their material from Gregory added details. The Chronicle of Fredegar names the faithful friend of Childeric as "Wiomad", and says that he was a Frank who had once rescued Childeric by flight when he and his mother were being led away captive by the Huns. The Liber Historiae Francorum calls him Viomad. Both texts tell stories about Wiomad deliberately advising Aegidius to make bad decisions which made him unpopular, so that Childeric could return.

Modern scholars have traditionally been sceptical that a Roman could be a "king" (Latin: rex) of Franks, but several have also speculated that the story may have reflected a memory of something real.

- While one of the main reasons for scepticism is that this story involves a Roman using the title king, many historians have pointed out that the term "rex" was sometimes used for Romans and it could have a more general meaning something like "ruler". He may also have called himself king only in barbarian contexts, or else the title was not used in his own lifetime.
- Guy Halsall and other historians have proposed that the 8 year period may reflect the span of time when Aegidius led the Roman forces of northern Gaul, from 457 until his death in 465. He also suggested that the story might be connected to the refusal of Aegidius to accept Severus as emperor after the murder of Majorian in 461, putting his Roman position in doubt. Halsall proposed that "to legitimise his position", Aegidius may have taken the Frankish title instead.
- Ulrich Nonn and Eugen Ewig believed that the exile story reflects a real sequence of events whereby Childeric was a leader of "Salian" or "Belgian" Franks based in the Romanized areas conquered by Chlodio. They constituted a Roman allied force under the lordship of Aegidius, which he was temporarily able to take over when Chlodio and his imperial patron died.
- Ernst Stein suggested that the Franks may have placed themselves under Roman rule in the absence of Childeric.
- Michael Kulikowski posits that his comitatenses (armies) were so heavily Frankish at this point, that he could fairly be remembered as a king, rather than general.

The story was possibly also intended to explain the origins of the mother of Clovis, who appeared in later genealogies.

It is generally assumed that Childeric had a continuing alliance with Aegidius, although there is only slim historical evidence for it. In contrast to modern scholars, the Chronicle of Fredegar and Liber Historiae Francorum both reported that after his return Childeric and Aegidius fought battles against each other. Fredegar says that Childeric fought many battles with Aegidius and that many slaughters of Romans were carried out by him. The Liber Historiae Francorum gives the following:

In those days the Franks captured the city of Agrippina on the Rhine, and they called it Cologne, as though coloni inhabited it. They killed many of the Romans belonging to Aegidius’s party there. Aegidius himself escaped by fleeing. They then came to the city of Trier on the river Moselle, devastating those lands, and captured the city after setting it on fire. After these events Aegidius, king of the Romans, died.

In fact there are no clear source which give an exact date for the Frankish takeover of Cologne and Trier.

== Enmity with Agrippinus ==
Both Hydatius and the Vita Lupicini, the medieval biography of Lupicinus of Condat found in the Vita patrum Iurensium, report that there was lasting enmity between Aegidius and another respected Gallo-Roman named Agrippinus. Agrippinus was born in Gaul and had been magister militum in Gaul in theearly 450s, meaning he was probably the predecessor of Aegidius in that position and he may have been ejected from this position after the fall of his Gaul Avitus.

The Vita Lupicini reports that Aegidius made a malicious accusation against Agrippinus, that he was secretly attempting to detach parts of the empire and give them to barbarians. It takes the side of Agrippinus, who may have been a patron of the abbey at Condat. Lupicinus himself accompanied Agrippinus under guard to Italy where he was to be executed, but he escaped, and when he knew that opinion had turned in his favour he returned to Gaul and a new position of honour. This accusation is likely to have been made during the period when Aegidius was magister militum because the Vita reports the high-ranking Agrippinus addressing Aegidius as a superior. Although many historians assume that this incident is connected to the one later reported by Hydatius in 462, when Agrippinus seems to have given Narbonne to the Visigoths, in 462, but at this time Aegidius was in conflict with the emperor. Mathisen has therefore argued that there were two distinct incidents, and given the involvement of Lupicinus, it seems more likely that the barbarians who were receiving territory were the Burgundians, whose territory did indeed expand during the time of Avitus. The return to favour of Agrippinus may have been connected to the death of Majorian.

In 462, after the death of Majorian, Hydatius reports once again that Aegidius and his were enemies. Agrippinus gave Narbonne to the Goths in return for their assistance. At this time, Majorian was dead, and Aegidius was in rebellion, having not accepted the new emperor. Some historians believe that the Romans gave Narbonne in order to have the Goths attack Aegidius, who had withdrawn to northern Gaul.

== Rebellion in 461 ==
After Ricimer assassinated Emperor Majorian in 461 and replaced him with Libius Severus, Aegidius refused to recognize the new emperor. Libius Severus was not recognized by the Eastern Roman Emperor Leo I, who was considered the senior emperor. Aegidius may have pledged his allegiance directly to Leo I in order to legitimize his independence from the Western Roman Empire, and his retention of the Gallic legions.

Priscus noted Aegidius's refusal to recognize Libius Severus, and that after the death Majorian the government in Italy feared not only the military forces of Aegidius in Gaul, but also the Vandals in North Africa, and Marcellinus who was magister militum in Dalmatia. However, in the case of Aegidius, the fact that he was in a territorial conflict with the Goths stopped him from invading Italy. Aegidius was said by Priscus to have distinguished himself in the fighting.

Ricimer probably appointed a replacement for Aegidius, despite the fact that Aegidius retained most or all of his Gallic forces. The two people most likely to have been given the title of magister militum per Gallias (master of soldiers in Gaul) were the Roman general Agrippinus, who Aegidius had previously accused of treason, or the Burgundian King Gundioc, who was Ricimer's brother-in-law.

== War with the Goths ==
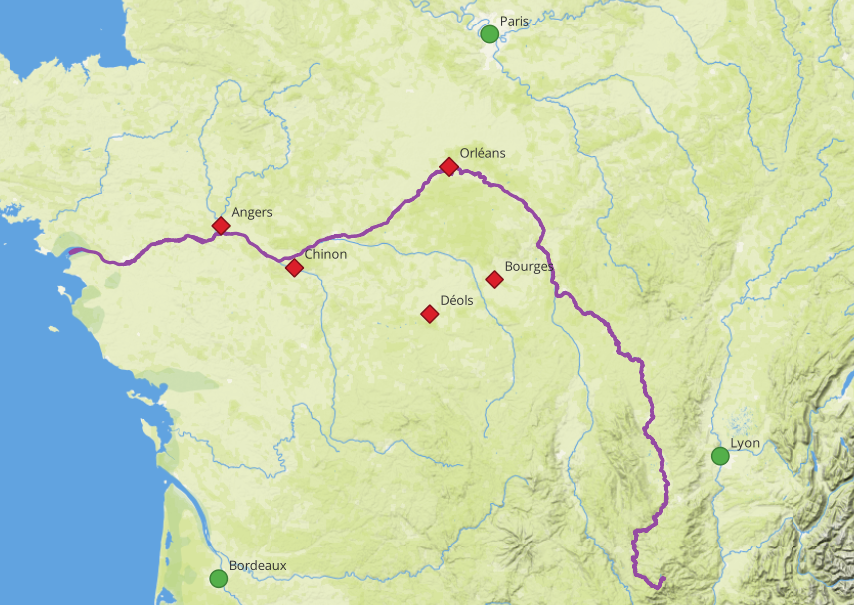
The Loire. The red diamonds are places relevant to the Battle of Orleans in 463

Aegidius repulsed an invasion by the Aquitanian Goths in 463, routing them at the Battle of Orleans. In this battle, Aegidius's forces killed the Visigoth general Frederic, who was the brother of Theodoric. The forces of Aegidius were apparently largely Frankish.

In 442, Orleans became the based on an Alan kingdom who were established there by Aetius to put down rebellions which had been troubling Armorican region. In 451 both the Armoricans and the Alans from Orleans fought under Aetius at the Battle of the Catalaunian Plains against Attila. Although the Goths defeated some Alans in battle in 453 it is possible that the Orleans region was still partly settled by Alans.

The sources report the conflict where Frederic was killed as follows:

- The Gallic Chronicle of 511 says that Frederic died near the Loire, and specifies that he was fighting Franks.
- The chronicle of Marius of Avenches specifies that Frederic died in a battle between Aegidius and Franks, near Orleans, between Loire and Loiret.
- Hydatius reported the death of Frederic in a set of entries under a heading for the year 461, but where the headings for the years 462–464 are not marked. It said that Frederic the brother of King Theoderic, rose up with rebels (those who had previously been defeated), against Aegidius, count of both branches of the military service. He also mentioned that this happened in the Armorican region, which in this period was the region between the Loire and Seine.

Typically this battle in Orleans is equated to the "battles" which Gregory of Tours says that Childeric fought in Orleans, because is generally believed to have led the Frankish forces fighting on the side of Aegidius. However, some scholars doubt that this was the same battle.

Aegidius also besieged Chinon, at an unknown date, possibly connected to the battles around 463. Despite these victories, he did not take the offensive against the Gothic position in Aquitaine, possibly due to lack of resources, or due to threats from other warlords such as perhaps comes (count) Paulus, Gundioc, and the Western Roman generals Arbogast and Agrippinus.

== Embassy to the Vandals ==
Hydatius reported that in May 464 Aegidius sent an embassy to the Vandal king Gaiseric via an Ocean route, probably in an effort to form an alliance to oppose Ricimer. This embassy returned in September, around about the time when Aegidius died.

== Death and legacy ==
One of the 461–464 entries by Hydatius notes that "on the thirteenth day before the Kalends of August, a Monday, the sun was seen diminished" which is an eclipse dated to 464. Soon after this an entry says that Aegidius died "some say by ambush or treachery, others that he was deceived by poison. When he was gone, the Goths soon invaded the regions which he had been defending in the Roman name". Hydatius reports that people either say Aegidius was ambushed or poisoned, but he does not mention who did it.

After his death, Gregory of Tours reported that he was succeeded by his son Syagrius. Gregory also reported that Syagrius ruled as "King of Romans" based in Soissons, which his father had held before him, until he was defeated in battle by Clovis I, the son of Childeric. This was a major step in the expansion of the power of Clovis, and his creation of a unified Frankish successor state.

Modern historians refer to his lordship of the Kingdom of Soissons. The Franks defeated Syagrius and captured Soissons in the 480s.

== Historiography ==
Aegidius was referred to by numerous titles in primary sources, many of which were contradictory. In the Historia Francorum by Gregory of Tours, he is twice called magister militum (Master of Soldiers), although Gregory describes him as being elected rex (king) of the Franks. Even more confusingly, Gregory does not give him any title while mentioning his death. The Liber Historiae Francorum refers to him initially as rex, but later twice calls him principem Romanorum (the Roman emperor). In the 'A' version of the Liber Historiae Francorum, he is called Romanorum rex (King of the Romans) at the time of his death, while the 'B' version calls him Romanorum tirannus (Roman tyrant), implying that he was a usurper. The Chronicle of Fredegar calls him comes (count). Based on the two references from the Liber Historiae Francorum which refer to him as emperor, and the occasional usage of the title of rex to refer to an emperor, some have asserted that he was in fact an emperor, although this is based upon shaky evidence, and is considered very unlikely by most historians.

Information regarding his place of birth and his son comes from Gregory of Tours, the Chronicle of Fredegar, and the Liber Historiae Francorum. His service with Majorian under Aetius is related by Priscus, who also mentions his subsequent influence with Majorian as emperor. His elevation to magister militum per Gallias is given by Gregory and Hydatius. The loss of Cologne and Trier is provided by the Liber Historiae Francorum, and his encirclement in Arles by Paulinus of Périgueux's Life of St. Martin and Gregory.

Regnal titles
Preceded by None	Ruler of the Kingdom of Soissons; 461–464/465 AD	Succeeded by Childeric I
Political offices
Preceded by Agrippinus	Magister militum of Gaul; 458–464/465 AD	Succeeded by Childeric I
