= Syagrius =

5th century Roman leader at Soissons

Syagrius (died 486/487) was the leader of an isolated Roman community based in Soissons which still existed after the Roman empire lost control over the region around it. Modern historians refer to his state as the Kingdom of Soissons, because the 6th-century writer, Gregory of Tours referred to Syagrius as a "King of Romans" (Latin: rex Romanorum), while the Chronicle of Fredegar calls him a Roman patrician. However, the term "king" (rex) was not traditionally used by Roman leaders, and in this period the term was more associated with the Frankish rulers who were ruling other previously Roman cities in the same region.

Syagrius was killed by the Frankish king Clovis I at the Battle of Soissons (Franco-Roman War of 486) in about 486, and this is generally understood to have been a major step in Clovis's subsequent takeover of most of Gaul, which unified Roman and Frankish cities and military forces.

The father of Syagrius was named Aegidius, and he had been the Roman military leader of Gaul appointed under the emperor Majorian (reigned 457–461). After the murder of Majorian he did not accept the new emperor, and he held position in northern Gaul, while the south of Gaul was ruled by the large kingdoms of the Visigoths and Burgundians who were both allies of the emperor. The exact division of power between Aegidius and other armed forces in Northern Gaul such as the Franks is unclear, and even more unclear after his death in 465. Gregory mentions that Aegidius had held Soissons before his son did, but the nature of this holding is not clear.

== Before the attack of Clovis ==
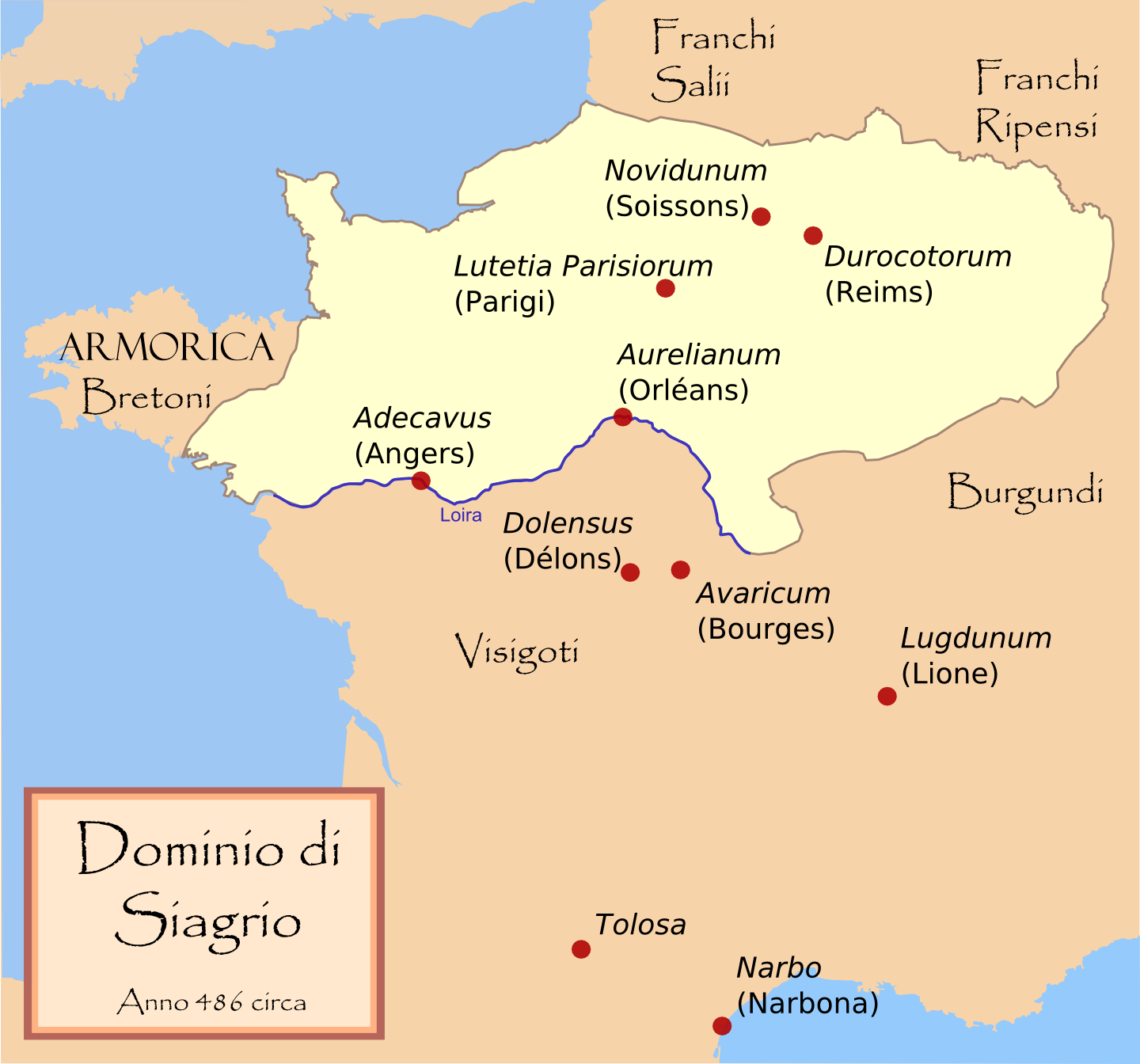
A large proposal about the size of Syagrius's kingdom

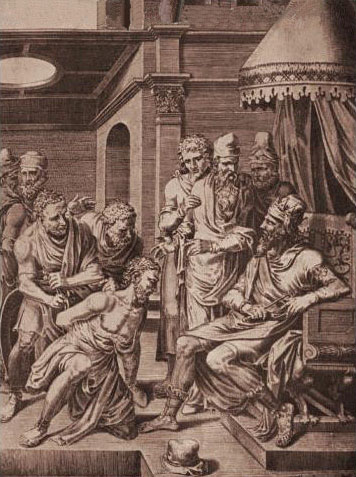
The captured Syagrius is brought before Alaric II who orders him sent to Clovis I

Syagrius is mentioned only twice by Gregory of Tours. In one difficult to interpret passage (II.18) he mentions that when Aegidius died, he was survived by his son Syagrius. The passage appears to be composed of copied text from annals which are otherwise lost. Aegidius is known from a small number of records as the Roman military leader (magister militum) of Gaul appointed under the emperor Majorian (reigned 457–461) in 457, who (like the Eastern Roman Empire) refused to recognize the new emperor Libius Severus when Majorian was murdered in 461. After this he was restricted to northern Gaul, while the south of Gaul was ruled by the large kingdoms of the Visigoths and Burgundians who were both allies of the emperor, and the king-maker Ricimer (died 472). In 463 different contemporary records indicate that either he, or "the Franks", fought the Visigoths successfully at Orleans, and the king's brother Frederic was killed. In 465 Aegidius was himself murdered. In northern Gaul it is possible that Aegidius had family connections to Soissons, giving him a position of power there.

In several of the records which exist Aegidius is associated with Frankish troops of northern Gaul, and particularly with King Childeric. Gregory (II.12) even claimed that Aegidius was elected as king of the Franks for 8 years, during a period when Childeric was unpopular among them for seducing their daughters. Although scholars are sceptical of the details in this "fairy tale", many take the association between the two men seriously and believe that Childeric led a Roman-aligned group of Frankish troops for Aegidius during the Battle of Orleans in 463 (Gothic war against Aegidius), when Visigothic forces were defeated.

After mentioning that Aegidius died and left a son, Gregory of Tours jumps from one event to another, mentioning battles in the Loire region. Modern scholars believe these battles happened in about 469, when records indicate that the eastern-backed emperor Anthemius called for support from Britain in order to stop the Visigoths from taking control of all of Gaul. In Gregory's passage Visigothic forces attacked Britons near Bourges, and an otherwise unknown person, Count Paul, plundered a Visigothic force together with Romans and Franks. It is mentioned that Paul died, and that after this Childeric captured Angers, which had been held by Saxons. There is no mention of Syagrius who may have still been young. Furthermore, although modern scholars tend to interpret the passage to mean that Count Paul and Childeric were on the same side as Aegidius, both the Chronicle of Fredegar and the Liber Historiae Francorum interpreted Gregory to mean that Childeric had killed Count Paul, and as historian Edward James has pointed out "there were at least two factions among the Romans, and Paul's Romans were not necessarily Aegidius's Romans, nor, indeed, was Childeric ever necessary an ally of Aegidius". Furthermore, we "do not know how young Syagrius was at the time, or if he was under the protection of Count Paul, or, indeed, if he was protected by Childeric against Count Paul and his faction".

After the death of Aegidius it is unclear how political power in Northern Gaul was divided between various leaders, or how many leaders there were. There was clearly more than one Roman (civitas) (city district) which was ruled by a king—Gregory mentioning several Frankish kings of cities such as Ragnachar in Cambrai. Two letters from contemporary Romans mention a Roman named Arbogast, based in Trier, who is referred to in one letter with the Roman title of comes (count), even though the other letter mentions that Roman law is no longer in effect around Trier. Childeric on the other hand was not associated with a specific city in contemporary documents, even though archaeological evidence shows that he was buried in Tournai. Some historians such as Edward James have proposed that Childeric may have had a leadership role over a larger area, and might even have been seen as a Roman office-holder in the way that the Burgundian kings were even after the dethroning of the last Western emperor by Odoacer in Italy in 476. James noted that a letter by Saint Remigius to Clovis stated that his ancestors had administered the Roman province of Belgica Secunda which included Tournai, Reims, and Soissons, and the biography of Saint Genevieve mentions Childeric twice as an important person in the context of the Paris region. Childeric's grave also shows the insignia of a Roman military commander, and so when Gregory mentions that Childeric worked with Odoacer against Allamanni who were threatening a part of Italy, James takes the possibility seriously.

On the other hand, Syagrius and Childeric, like their Burgundian contemporaries and Odoacer, may have seen themselves to be under the authority of the eastern Roman emperor after 476. A contemporary historian in the Eastern Roman Empire, Candidus Isaurus, reported that the Gauls revolted against Odoacer, and sent an embassy to the Eastern emperor Zeno, who took the side of Odoacer. While making a case against James concerning the importance of Syagrius, MacGeorge argued that this failed embassy could "just conceivably" have been connected to Syagrius, because the south of Roman Gaul was administered by the kingdoms of the Visigoths and Burgundians and it is "difficult to imagine" anyone other than Syagrius making this contact.

== Battle of Soissons ==
The second mention of Syagrius (II.25), which is approximately copied by the Chronicle of Fredegar and the Liber Historiae Francorum, mentions that after Childeric died, Clovis his son succeeded, and five years into his reign he marched upon Syagrius at Soissons with his relative Ragnachar, who was the Frankish king at Cambrai. They challenged Syagrius to battle and he didn't hesitate to march out to battle. He lost, and fled to Alaric II, king of the Visigoths in Toulouse. When Clovis threatened him, Alaric handed him over, and Syagrius was later secretly murdered in captivity.

Despite being isolated from the surviving portions of the Roman Empire, Syagrius managed to maintain some degree of Roman authority in northern Gaul, independent from Frankish leaders such as Childeric, for an unknown length of time. Although there is no clear evidence, scholars generally assume that he held his position for significantly longer than his father did.

As Edward Gibbon later wrote, "It would be ungenerous, without some more accurate knowledge of his strength and resources, to condemn the rapid flight of Syagrius, who escaped after the loss of a battle to the distant court of Toulouse." Toulouse was the capital of Alaric II, king of the Visigoths. Intimidated by the victorious Franks, the Visigoths imprisoned Syagrius, then surrendered him to Clovis. He died not long after, executed in secret according to Gregory of Tours.

== Family ==
The name Syagrius appeared several times in the Romano-Gaulish aristocracy and some scholars have proposed that it was an inherited name, used by a specific family, the so-called Syagrii.

Despite the execution of Syagrius, the family apparently prospered under Frankish rule. King Guntram sent a Count Syagrius on a diplomatic mission to the Byzantine Empire in 585. A member of the family, Syagria, made a large donation of land to the monks of Novalesa Abbey in 739. According to Musset, the "last known member of the Syagrii was an abbot of Nantua who was mentioned in 757".

== Title ==
Historians have mistrusted the title "Rex Romanorum" that Gregory of Tours gave him, at least as early as Edward Gibbon, who dismissed it as “incredible” (chap. xxviii, n. 15). The common consensus has been to follow Gibbon, based on the historical truism that Romans hated kingship from the days of the expulsion of Tarquin the Proud; for example, Syagrius's article in the Prosopography of the Later Roman Empire omits this title, preferring to refer to him as a "Roman ruler (in North Gaul)". However, Steven Fanning has assembled a number of examples of rex being used in a neutral, if not favorable, context, and argues that "the phrase Romanorum rex is not peculiar to Gregory of Tours or to Frankish sources", and that Gregory's usage may indeed show "that they were, or were seen to be, claiming to be Roman emperors."

== See also ==
- Last of the Romans
- Neustria

== Bibliography ==
- Fanning, Steven (1992). "Emperors and empires in fifth-century Gaul". In Drinkwater, John & Elton, Hugh (eds.). Fifth-Century Gaul: A Crisis of Identity?. Cambridge: University Press. pp. 288–297. ISBN 0-521-41485-7.
- Fleuriot, Léon (1980). Les origines de la Bretagne (in French). Paris: Éditions Payot. ISBN 978-2-22812-710-3.
- Gregory of Tours (1916). History of the Franks. Vol. book II. Translated by Earnest Brehaut.
- Hughes, Ian (2015). Patricians and Emperors: The Last Rulers of the Western Roman Empire. Barnsley: Pen & Sword Books. ISBN 978-1-84884-412-4.
- James, Edward (1988). The Franks. The Peoples of Europe. Oxford, UK; Cambridge, Massachusetts: Basil Blackwell. ISBN 0-631-17936-4.
- Musset, Lucien (1965). The Germanic Invasions: The Making of Europe 400–600 AD. New York: Barnes & Noble Books. ISBN 978-1-56619-326-9.
- Martindale, John R., ed. (1980). The Prosopography of the Later Roman Empire: Volume II, AD 395–527. Cambridge: Cambridge University Press. ISBN 0-521-20159-4.
- MacGeorge, Penny (2002). Late Roman Warlords. Oxford University Press. ISBN 0-19-925244-0.

Regnal titles
Preceded by Aegidius	Ruler of the Domain of Soissons; 464–486	Succeeded by Clovis I
