= Arbogast (count of Trier) =

Frankish noble

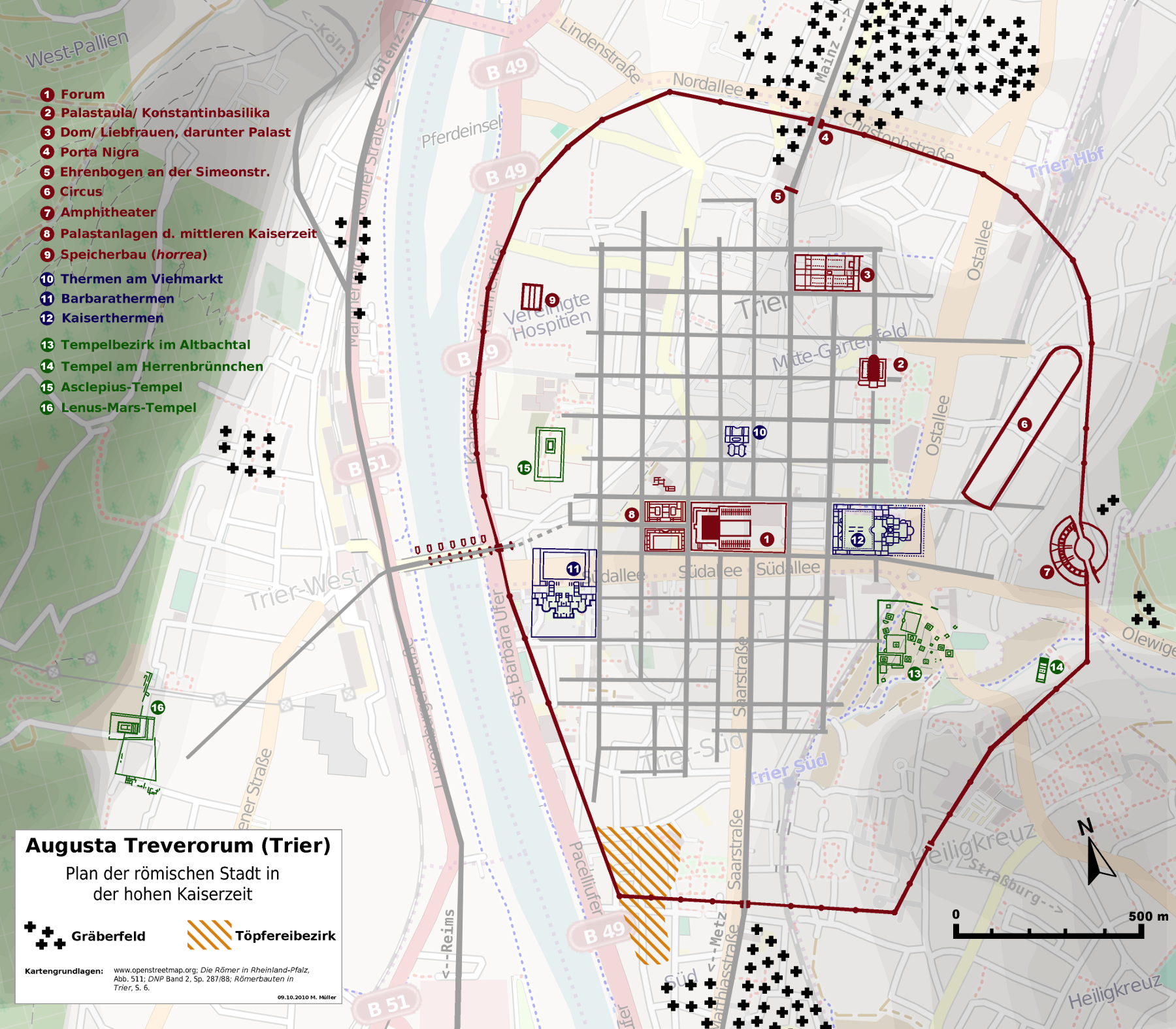
A map of Trier in Roman times as Augusta Treverorum

Arbogast was a comes (Count) of Trier of Frankish origin in the late fifth century.

Arbogast is mentioned in letters sent to him by two bishops: one by Sidonius Apollinaris probably dating back to 471 or more probably 476-477 and another from 470 by Auspicius of Toul who addresses him as comes of Trier. This latter is found in the Austrasian Letters collection.

Arbogast was born into a Romanized Frankish family and was a Catholic Christian. His father Arigius (mentioned by Auspicius) was possibly a native of Trier, and one of his ancestors was the 4th century magister militum who was also named Arbogast. Arbogast was obviously highly educated, and Sidonius Apollinaris (Epistulae 4.17) praises him as one of the last defenders of the collapsing Western Roman Empire and Roman culture.

Arbogast independently ruled his relatively small domain with the help of remaining Roman troops and Frankish foederati following the political disintegration of Gaul in the early 460s. Although Trier may have formally pledged allegiance to the Ripuarian Franks by 475, Franz Staab notes that Frankish graves are entirely absent from the area before 500. Arbogast's reign may thus represent a transitional period between Roman and Frankish rule. The culture of late antiquity died out soon afterwards in the sixth century.

In 486, the Frankish king Clovis I incorporated the remaining Roman territory between the Somme and the Loire into his own territory by defeating the last Roman governor Syagrius at Soissons. He most likely also appropriated the territory of Arbogast around the same time. According to Hans Hubert Anton, Arbogastes fled to Chartres.

== Sources ==
- Anton, Hans Hubert (1973). "Arbogast. Comes in Trier". Reallexikon der Germanischen Altertumskunde. Vol. 1 (2nd ed.). Berlin/New York: Walter de Gruyter. pp. 388ff.
- Penny MacGeorge (2002), Late Roman Warlords, p. 75
- Franz Staab, "Les royaumes francs au ve siècle", Clovis – Histoire et Mémoire – Actes du colloque international d'histoire de Reims, vol. 1, Presses Universitaires de la Sorbonne, December 1997, pp. 541-566, ISBN 2-84050-079-5.
