= Chronica Gallica of 511 =

The Chronica or Cronaca Gallica of 511, also called the Gallic Chronicle of 511, is a chronicle of late antiquity preserved today in a single manuscript of the thirteenth century now in Madrid. It resembles in all its traits another late antique Gallic chronicle, the Chronica Gallica of 452, of which it may be a continuation.

Like the chronicle of 452, it was written in the south of Gaul, possibly at Arles or Marseille. The sources of its author include the earlier chronicle, the chronicle of Sulpicius Severus, that of Hydatius, that of Orosius, and the imperial consular records. It was added to a compilation of texts in Spain in 733. The chronicle is considered an extremely complex document, containing an epitome—probably an epitome that has been condensed further—instead of Severus' chronicle detailing the history of the world. It was also described as one of the earliest extant works that used Hydatius as a source and was an exiguous revision—and also continuation—of Eusebius' chronicle translated by Jerome.

The chronicle covers the period from 379 to 509/511, from which derives its name. Its entries are short and pointed, but only (approximately) datable by the rare reference to the regnal year of an emperor and by the (assumed) chronological ordering of events. Among the events for which there is no other extant source is the defeat and death of Anthemiolus around 471. Some of its contents including the dates of an emperor's reign and the chronology of events are not accurate.

== Sources ==
- Burgess, R. "The Gallic Chronicle of 511: A New Critical Edition with a Brief Introduction." Society and Culture in Late Antique Gaul: Revisiting the Sources. edd. R. W. Mathisen and D. Shantzer. Aldershot, 2001. pp 85–100.
- Jan-Markus Kötter, Carlo Scardino (eds.): Gallische Chroniken (= Kleine und fragmentarische Historiker der Spätantike G 7–8). Schöningh, Paderborn 2016, ISBN 978-3-506-78489-6 (edition, translation and commentary of the Chronica).
