= Libius Severus =

Western Roman emperor from 461 to 465

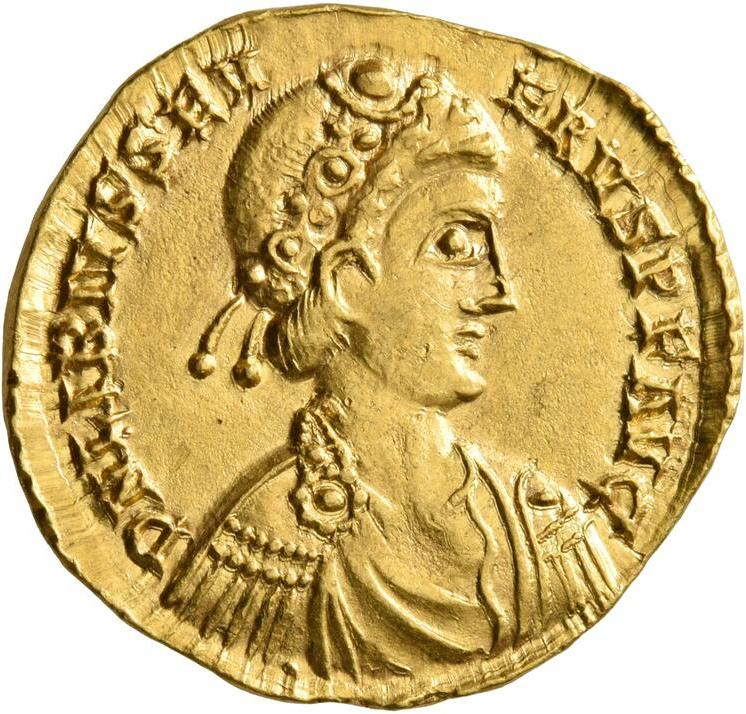
- Solidus of Libius Severus marked: d·n· libius severus p·f· aug·

Roman emperor
- Reign: 19 November 461 – 14 November 465 (Note: Most modern scholars give 19 November 461 and 14 November 465 for Severus's ascension and death respectively, but the ancient sources are not unanimous. Both Victor of Tunnuna and Theophanes the Confessor give 7 July 461 for Severus's ascension; the Fasti vindobonenses priores gives 15 August 465 for Severus's death, though such an early date is contested by the PLRE.)
- Predecessor: Majorian
- Successor: Anthemius
- Eastern emperor: Leo I
- Born: Lucania
- Died: 14 November 465
Names
- Libius Severus (Serpentius?)
- Religion: Christianity

Libius Severus (died November 14, 465), sometimes enumerated as Severus III, was Western Roman emperor from November 19, 461 until his death. A native of Lucania, Severus was the fourth of the so-called "Shadow Emperors" who followed the deposition of the Valentinianic dynasty in 455. He ruled for just under four years, attaining the throne after his predecessor, Majorian, was overthrown by his magister militum, Ricimer. Severus was the first of a series of emperors who were highly dependent on the general, and it is often presumed that Ricimer held most of the de facto power during Severus's reign.

Severus's reign was marked by diplomatic tension and an erosion of Rome's control over the non-Italian provinces. Diplomatically, Severus failed to secure the eastern emperor Leo's recognition, and the alliance Majorian had made with Vandal king Gaiseric crumbled as the Vandals raided Italy. In Gaul and Dalmatia officials loyal to Majorian refused to submit to Severus's rule, and Northern Italy was invaded by the Alans.

Severus remains an extremely obscure figure. The ancient sources are almost completely mute on his life and character. Because of the size of Ricimer's influence, no single imperial action can be definitively attributed to Severus; thus the extent of Ricimer's control over imperial affairs during the reign of Severus remains a point of contention among scholars.

== Name ==
Modern scholars are in agreement that Severus's first two names are Libius Severus. However, in Late Latin, the interchanging of b and v became common, and thus Severus's cognomen is sometimes rendered incorrectly as Livius.

In addition to these two names, Severus is sometimes referred to by a third name, Serpentius. The Chronicon Paschale uses only this name for the emperor, and the chronicle of Theophanes the Confessor uses both Severus and Serpentius. Modern scholars are divided as to the authority of this attribution: some (including the PLRE) say the text is corrupt and its meaning uncertain, while others argue it was a signum or supernomen deriving from the word for serpent. Among those who accept the name, its source—whether it is of Eastern or Western origin—is also disputed.

== Background ==
=== Geopolitical background ===
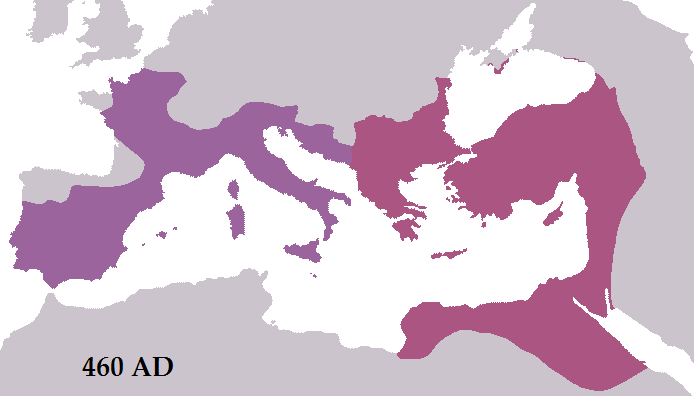
The Eastern (red) and Western (purple) Roman empires in 460 AD, one year before Severus's ascension

By the time of Severus, the Roman Empire's governance had been firmly split between two centers of power: one in the East centered at Constantinople and one in the West centered at either Rome or Ravenna. During the late fourth and early fifth century the East saw a period of relative peace. The West on the other hand underwent a series of invasions, major political upheavals, and losses of important provinces. By the early 460s, Britain had been abandoned, Africa had been conquered by the Vandals, and Hispania was occupied by the Suebi and the Visigoths (who were foederati of the empire).

During this time, in both the Eastern and Western courts, barbarian generals became increasingly influential; at times, these generals' power rivaled even the emperors'. Of these figures, the most prominent in the West were Stilicho (under the emperor Honorius) and Aëtius (under Valentinian III). After Aëtius's assassination in 454, the western empire entered a downward spiral. Valentinian was deposed, his surviving family was taken captive by Gaiseric, and the replacement emperor (Maximus) was killed while Rome was sacked.

Out of this political chaos, the magister militum Ricimer and general Majorian were able to quickly seize power. Ricimer was a popular and successful military commander, but because he was of non-Roman origin, he was not an acceptable candidate for emperor in the minds of the Senate and people of Rome. Thus, Majorian became emperor with Ricimer still retaining significant political and military authority.

Majorian's reign proved to be an active and healthy one. Recognized by the eastern emperor Leo I, Majorian's reign saw political reform and the strengthening of Roman control over Gaul and Hispania. However, in 461, Ricimer had Majorian killed. Though the ancient sources are almost unanimous on that Majorian was assassinated by Ricimer, (Note: Procopius is the sole exception, but modern scholars discount his narrative in this case.) it remains unclear why Ricimer carried out this act. One reading suggests that Ricimer wanted absolute power from the outset, and that Majorian proved too independent and capable for Ricimer to effectively control. Whatever his motives, Majorian's death cemented Ricimer as the most powerful man in the Western empire.

=== Personal background ===
Almost nothing is known about the person of Severus; perhaps the only definitive piece of personal information that has come down to us, aside from his name, is a single line in the Chronica Gallica of 511: "and Severus, from the Lucanian lands, was elevated as emperor and consul." One other source notes that Severus "lived religiously." Modern scholars speculate that he was a high-ranking member of society and very likely a senator. He seems to have spent most of his rule in Rome rather than Ravenna, but whether this was out of personal preference, political expediency, precedent set by Valentinian, or Ricimer's prerogative is unknown.

== Reign ==
After the death of Majorian, a three-month interregnum followed, where the title of Western Emperor remained unclaimed. During this interregnum, a political struggle for the succession ensued between Ricimer, eastern emperor Leo I, and Gaiseric, the King of the Vandals. Eventually, however, on 19 November 461, Severus was acclaimed augustus by the senate in Ravenna.

=== Contested legitimacy ===
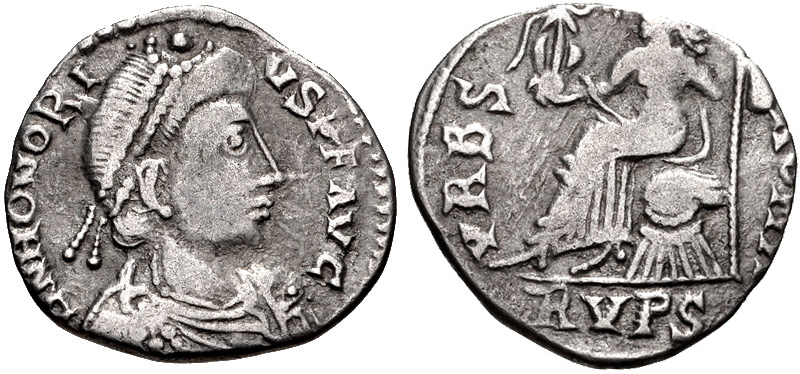
Siliqua of Gaiseric from ca. 455–476; marked: dn honorius p f avg / vrbs roma rvps

Throughout his reign, Severus's legitimacy proved to be a major political issue. Immediately after the death of Majorian, the western court faced three political obstacles:

- Gaiseric, after capturing many of the women of Valentinian's family during the sack of Rome in 455, married them to his son Huneric and Italian nobleman Olybrius. Olybrius was now one of the senior male members of the Valentinian Dynasty and also Gaiseric's nephew-in-law. After the murder of Majorian, some ancient sources (Note: For a discussion of the divergence in the ancient sources, see) report that Gaiseric began raiding the Italian coast in an attempt to pressure Ricimer to depose Severus and elevate Olybrius.
- The eastern emperor Leo refused to recognize Severus, either as an augustus or as a consul. It seems that the official line in the east was that Severus's rule was invalid—the eastern historians who mention him, namely Marcellinus Comes and Jordanes, describe him as a usurper of the Western throne. This lack of recognition severely impeded cooperation between the two courts, and requests from the West for ships to relieve the besieged Italian coastlines were rejected. The eastern court did, however, recognize the western-appointed consul of 463, Caecina Decius Basilius, whose appointment some historians characterize as the result of negotiations between the two courts.
- Severus's reign was explicitly rejected by the magister militum per Gallias Aegidius and the semi-autonomous ruler of Illyricum Marcellinus. The revolt of these two commanders, formerly loyal to Majorian, meant the effective loss of two additional western provinces.

These problems persisted for the entirety of Severus's reign. Though Ricimer eventually subdued both Aegidius and Marcellinus, the separation of Dalmacia from the western empire would prove permanent.

=== Provincial unrest ===
At the time of the ascension of Severus, Marcellinus, an important military official in Dalmacia, was in Sicily in command of an army of ‘Scythians’—tribesmen (possibly Huns) from beyond the Danube—likely recruited by Marcellinus personally. Marcellinus, closely aligned with the eastern court, seems not to have recognized Severus. The size of the army so close to Italy alarmed Ricimer, who used a combination of political pressure on the eastern court and bribery of the soldiers under Marcellinus's command to force Marcellinus back across the sea: According to two fragments of Priscus's History of Byzantium, Ricimer bribed all the soldiers under Marcellinus's command to switch sides, and convinced the eastern court to send a man named Phylarchus to Marcellinus to persuade him not to attack the West.

In Gaul, Aegidius, though in revolt against Severus, was unable to cross the Alps as he was tied down defending against the Visigoths. Nevertheless, he maintained his independence in the north of Gaul for several years. To oppose Aegidius, Severus (or Ricimer) appointed Agrippinus to the office of magister militum per Gallias. Agrippinus asked for support from the Visigoths, and with their help moved against Aegidius and his Frankish allies, led by King Childeric I. However, in exchange for their support, in 462 the Visigoths received the city of Narbonne, thus gaining access to the Mediterranean Sea and separating Aegidius from the rest of the empire. After the death of Aegidius, Arvandus was appointed as Praetorian prefect of Gaul in 464.

In Northern Italy, there seems to have been an invasion of Alans under a king named Beorgor. The invasion culminated in the defeat of Beorgor at the Battle of Bergamo on 8 February 464. Little information is preserved about the invasion, but its presence in multiple sources including the Fasti Vindobonenses indicates that the invasion was a major one.

=== Conflict with the Vandals ===
After Severus's ascension, Gaiseric led the Vandals on a series of raids of the Italian coast. According to a fragment of John of Antioch's Historia Chronike, Gaiseric justified the raids by arguing that he was the rightful inheritor of Valentinian's and Aëtius's estates, as his son had married Valentinian's daughter Eudocia. Despite not pressing for Olybrius's enthronement explicitly, Gaiseric never relinquished his claim.

Vandal raids deeply affected the economy of the Italian landowners. Priscus reports that at some point during Severus's reign, some representatives of the Italian aristocracy went to the Emperor to plead for a reconciliation with Gaiseric. Severus sent the patrician Tatian on an embassy to the king of the Vandals, but Gaiseric rejected the terms outright.

=== Relationship with Ricimer ===
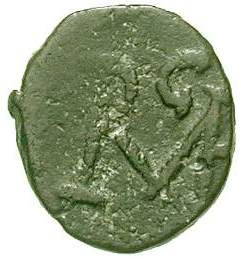
An example of a coin from either during or just after Severus's reign bearing the monogram RCME, sometimes identified with Ricimer

The relationship between Ricimer and Severus is a point of contention among scholars. The perhaps more traditional view has been to see Severus as a puppet emperor of Ricimer with little will of his own. This view is expressed by Edward Gibbon, who wrote "during that period [the six years between Majorian and Anthemius], the government was in the hands of Ricimer alone." Many modern historians agree with this assessment, including J. B. Bury, Thomas Hodgkin, John M. O'Flynn, and C. D. Gordon. However, some modern historians dispute this view, arguing that Severus may have had much more agency than the ancient sources suggest.

Important evidence for this controversy comes from inscriptions and numismatics. Some coins, dated approximately to Severus's reign, bear a monogram on the reverse sometimes identified with Ricimer. The monogram has been the source of significant scholarly disagreement; if the monogram is Ricimer's it represents a major shift in the constitution of the Late Empire. The monogram exists in two variant forms, and a number of interpretations (other than the traditional reading RICIMER) have been suggested: John Kent reads the inscription as ROMAE, making the monogram a mint mark. Some scholars suggest SEVERVS, reading the A in the variant form as a hypercorrection of E to AE. A number of other identifications have been put forward, including Avitus, Majorianus, Anthemius, Alpia, and Marcellinus. Other physical evidence includes a rectangular bronze plaque (perhaps an exagium, an official standard weight for coins) reading, "Health to our Lords [Leo and Severus] / and the patrician / Ricimer." (Note: 'salvis dd. nn. / et patricio / Ricimere' CIL X, 8072) The proximity of Ricimer's name to the emperors' indicates his ascendant position in the state.

It is also in the context of Severus's reign that the title rex, usually translated as king, is first applied to Ricimer: the sixth-century historian Marcellinus Comes writes in his chronicle: "Beorgor, King of the Alans, was killed by King Ricimer". (Note: 'Beorgor rex Halanorum a Ricimere rege occiditur.') However, Marcellinus's use of the term has been interpreted a number of ways, including as a reflection of his royal Gothic heritage, his increased political power and autonomy, or early evidence for his monarchical ambitions.

== Death ==
Severus died in Rome on 14 November 465 after ruling for just under four years. The details of Severus's death are obscure, and the ancient sources are in disagreement, but the majority of modern scholars contend that Severus died of natural causes.

Of the ancient sources which mention the death of Severus, two are of particular importance: Cassiodorus, in the 6th century, wrote that Severus was poisoned by Ricimer in his palace, (Note: 'ut dicitur Ricimeris fraude, Severus Romae in Palatio veneno peremptus est' Cassiodorus, Chronica , s.a. 465) while the poet Sidonius Apollinaris, in a panegyric to Majorian delivered at Rome, wrote that Severus died "according to the law of nature." (Note: "Auxerat Augustus naturae lege Severus / divorum numerum") The latter statement has been interpreted variously by historians, either as evidence for the existence of a rumor blaming Ricimer for Severus's death or as evidence against the existence of such a rumor. Ricimer may have been present at the reading of the panegyric, further complicating the situation.

Historians who accept that Ricimer may have killed Severus have put forward several possible motivations. Severus may have been an obstacle to Ricimer's reconciliation with Leo. Another theory suggests that Severus was much more active than Ricimer desired. According to this theory, Ricimer may have killed Severus in the hopes of reigning solely or with a less powerful puppet emperor. Because of the scarcity of evidence, it is difficult to make any certain judgement on the nature of Severus's death.

== Notes ==
Regnal titles
Preceded by Majorian	Western Roman emperor 461–465	Succeeded by Anthemius
Political offices
Preceded by Severinus; Dagalaifus	Roman consul 462 with Leo Augustus II	Succeeded by Caecina Decius Basilius; Vivianus
