= Alano Español =

Spanish breed of dog

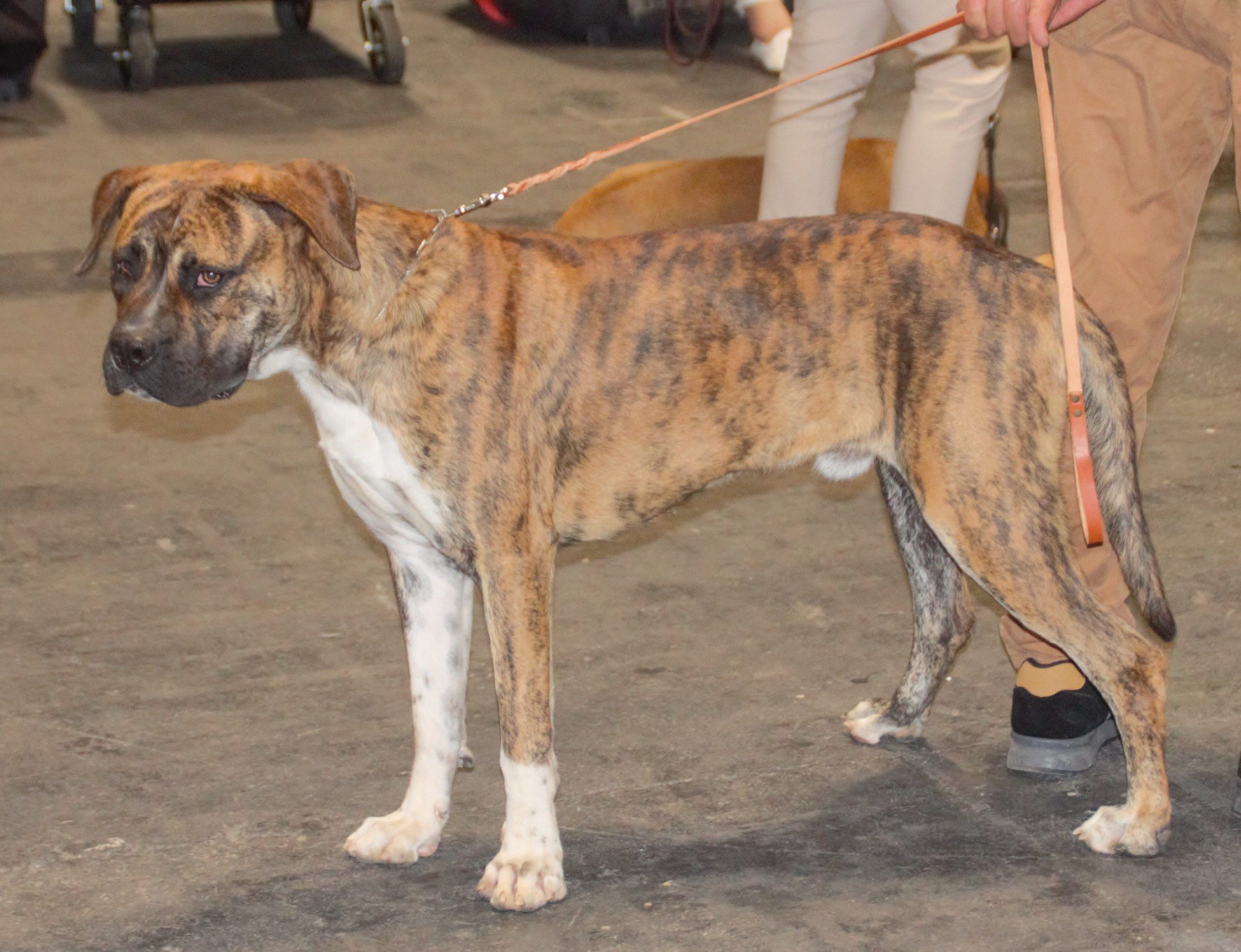
- Other names: Spanish Alaunt; Spanish Bulldog; Spanish Alano
- Origin: Spain
Traits
Height	Males	58–63 cm (23–25 in)
	Females	55–60 cm (22–24 in)
Weight	Males	30–40 kg (66–88 lb)
	Females	25–35 kg (55–77 lb)
- Coat: short and thick
- Colour: any shade of brindle, including grey or blue; any shade of fawn, from sand-coloured to red; black-and-brindle
Kennel club standards
- Real Sociedad Canina de España: standard
- Notes: recognised in Spanish legislation

The Alano Español or Spanish Bulldog is a Spanish breed of medium to large sized dog of alaunt or bulldog type. It has at various times been used as a war dog, for bullfighting, for the management of cattle, for hunting and as a guard dog.

In the later twentieth century it became an endangered breed; a recovery project was launched, and numbers have since recovered. It was officially recognised under national law in 2004.

== History ==
The origins of the Alano Español are unknown. One hypothesis is that it derives from dogs brought to Spain in the Migration Period in the fifth century by the Alani, a nomadic pastoralist people from Central Europe.

The first written reference to the breed in Spain is in a chapter of the fourteenth-century Libro de la Montería de Alfonso XI ("Book of the Hunt of Alfonso XI"), in which hunting dogs called Alani are described as having beautiful colours. Dogs of this type travelled with Spanish explorers and were used as war dogs in the subjugation of Native American peoples, as well as in the re-capture of slaves. Becerrillo, a ferocious war-dog owned by Juan Ponce de León, may have been of this type.

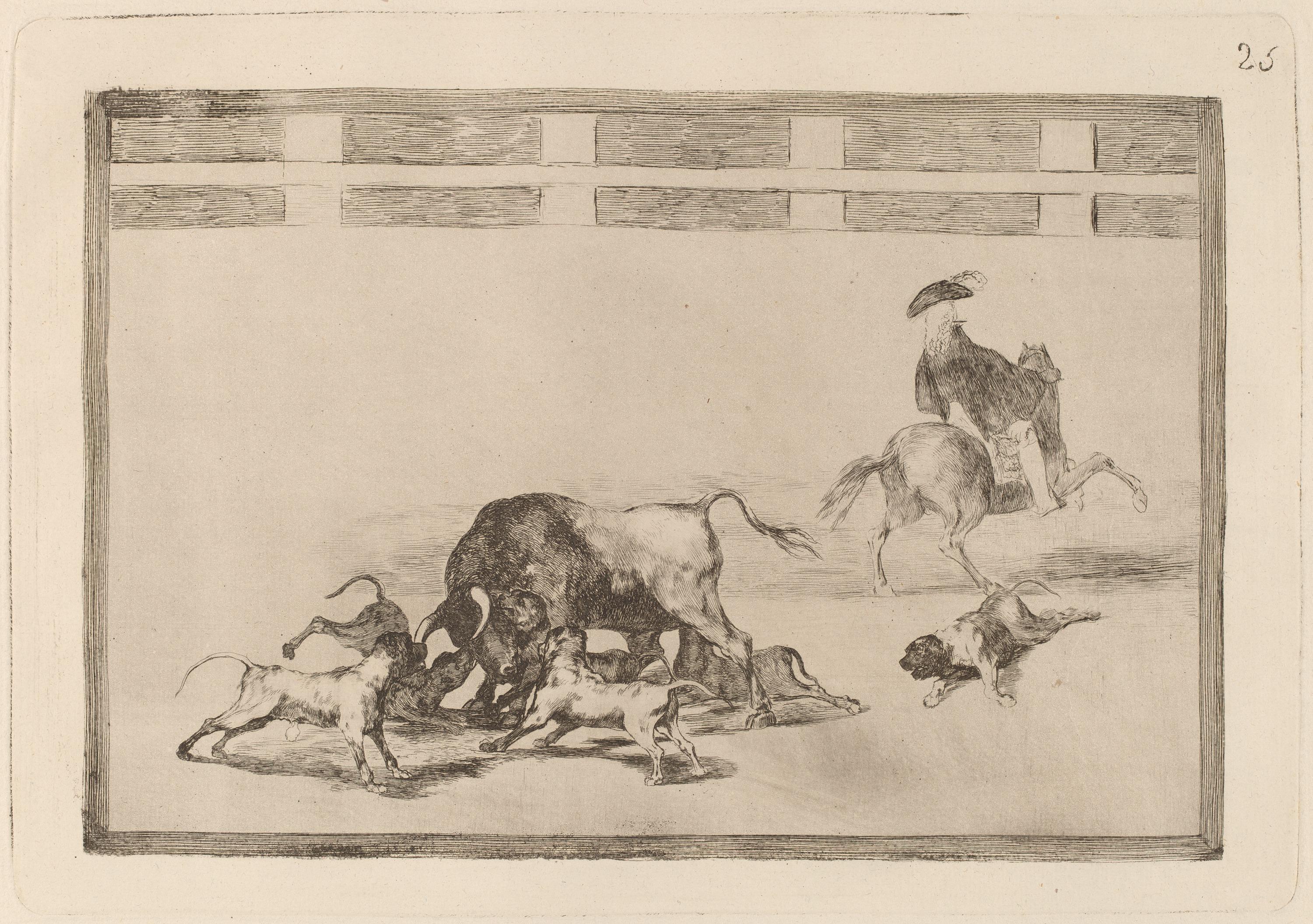
Dogs in the bull-ring, etching from La Tauromaquia, Francisco Goya, 1816

Dogs of this type are shown in the bullfighting ring in an etching by Francisco de Goya in his series La Tauromaquia of 1816.

From the late nineteenth century the Alano began to decline, for a variety of reasons: in 1880, the use of dogs in the bull-ring was prohibited, and the new practice of bullfighting on foot became more widespread; the manner of hunting changed, and more use was made of imported hunting dogs of foreign breeds; extensive management of livestock became less common in parts of the country; and the handling of livestock in slaughterhouses was modernised and no longer made use of dogs. The Alano was no longer needed for its traditional tasks, and numbers fell rapidly, almost to the point of the disappearance or extinction of the breed.

A surviving breeding population was identified in the mountains of Enkarterri/Las Encartaciones in the Basque Country in the 1980s. A breed standard was drawn up and a stud-book was started. In collaboration with the Real Sociedad Canina de España and municipal administrations including those of Alanís de la Sierra, Archidona, Cazalla and El Ronquillo, a recovery project was launched. There are two breed societies, the Asociación Nacional de Criadores de Alano Español (formed in 1995), and the Sociedad Española de Fomento y Cría del Alano Español.

The Alano Español was officially recognised by the Ministerio de Agricultura, Pesca y Alimentación, the Spanish ministry of agriculture, in 2004; together with the Pastor Garafiano, the Ratonero Valenciano, the Ratonero Mallorquín and the Ca Mè Mallorquí, it was added to the list of indigenous Spanish breeds. It is not recognised by the Fédération Cynologique Internationale.

It has been suggested that the Cimarrón Uruguayo of Uruguay derives principally from the Alano Español.

== Characteristics ==
The Alano Español is a large dog of alaunt or bulldog type. Females stand some 55–60 cm at the withers, and weigh about 25–30 kg; males are on average about 3 cm taller and 5 kg heavier.

The coat is short and thick but never velvety, and is most often a brindle; this may be of any colour, including grey or blue, with or without black. Other colours are fawn in any shade from sand-coloured to red, with or without black; and black-and-brindle – a black-and-tan in which the tan areas are brindled. The face may or may not have a black mask; the nose is pigmented black. White markings to the neck, chest or paws are acceptable, but excessive white is discouraged.

The head is large, strong, squarish and brachycephalic. The muzzle is short, ideally approximately 37% of the length of the head, with the lower jaw slightly concave; mild prognathism is tolerated. The ears are set high and are pendent if not cropped. The skin is very thick, with neck folds and some wrinkles on the face.

Since the breed was used for hunting in packs, it is sociable with other dogs.

== Use ==
The Alano was used from Mediaeval times as a war dog. It has since been used for hunting of boar and deer, as a guard dog, and in the management of cattle, both at pasture and at slaughterhouses. Until about the end of the nineteenth century it was used in the bull-ring; this use declined with the development of bullfighting on foot.
