= Alans =

Ancient Iranic people of the North Caucasus

Alani
- Map showing the migrations of the Alans

Languages
- Scythian, Alanic

Religion
- Ancient Iranic paganism, then Arianism (c. 5th century), and Nicene Christianity

Related ethnic groups
- Ossetians, Jasz people, Asuds

The Alans (Latin: Alani) were an ancient and medieval Iranic nomadic pastoral people who migrated to what is today the North Caucasus; some continued on to Europe and later North Africa. They are generally regarded as part of the Sarmatians, and possibly related to the Massagetae. Modern historians have connected the Alans with the Central Asian Yancai of Chinese sources and with the Aorsi of Roman sources. Having migrated westwards and becoming dominant among the Sarmatians on the Pontic–Caspian steppe, the Alans are mentioned by Roman sources in the 1st century CE. At that time they had settled in the region north of the Black Sea and frequently raided the Parthian Empire and the South Caucasus provinces of the Roman Empire. Between 215 and 250 CE the Goths broke their hold on the Pontic Steppe, thereby assimilating a significant population of associated Alans.

After the Hunnic defeat of the Goths on the Pontic Steppe around 375 CE, many of the Alans along with various Germanic tribes migrated westwards. They crossed the Rhine in 406 CE along with the Vandals and Suebi, settling in Orléans and Valence. Around 409 CE they joined the Vandals and Suebi in crossing the Pyrenees into the Iberian Peninsula, settling in Lusitania and Hispania Carthaginensis. The Iberian Alans, soundly defeated by the Visigoths in 418 CE, subsequently surrendered their autonomy to the Hasdingi Vandals. In 428 CE, the Vandals and Alans crossed the Strait of Gibraltar into North Africa, where they founded a kingdom which lasted until its conquest by Byzantine emperor Justinian I in 534 CE.

Eventually in the 9th century, those Alans who remained under Hunnic rule established the kingdom of Alania, a regional power in the Northern Caucasus. It survived until the Mongol invasions of the 13th century. Various scholars consider these Alans to be the ancestors of the modern Ossetians.

The Alans spoke an Eastern Iranian language which derived from Scytho-Sarmatian; in turn, the language evolved into the modern Ossetian language. The name Alan represents an Eastern Iranian dialectal form of the Old Iranian term Aryan, and so is cognate with the name of the country Īrān (from the gen. plur. *aryānām).

== Name ==
The Alans were documented by foreign observers from the 1st century onward under similar names: Latin: Alānī; Greek: Ἀλανοί Alanoi; Chinese: 阿蘭聊 Alanliao (Pinyin; Alan + Liu) in the 2nd century, 阿蘭 Alan in the 3rd century, later Alanguo (阿蘭國); Parthian and Middle Persian Alānān (plural); Arabic Alān (singular); Syriac Alānayē; Classical Armenian Alank'; Georgian Alaneti ('country of the Alans'); Hebrew Alan (pl. Alanim). Rarer Latin spellings include Alauni or Halani. The name was also preserved in the modern Ossetian language as Allon.

The ethnonym Alān is a dialectal variant of the Old Iranian *Aryāna, itself derived from the root arya-, meaning 'Aryan', the common self-designation of Indo-Iranian peoples. It probably came in use in the early history of the Alans for the purpose of uniting a heterogeneous group of tribes through the invocation of a common, ancestral 'Aryan' origin. Like the name of Iran (*Aryānām), the adjective *aryāna is related to Airyanəm Waēǰō ('stretch of the Aryas'), the mythical homeland of the early Iranians mentioned in the Avesta.

Some other ethnonyms also bear the name of the Alans: the Rhoxolāni ('Bright Alans'), an offshoot of the Alans whose name may be linked to religious practices, and the Alanorsoi ('White Alans'), perhaps a conglomerate of Alans and Aorsi. The personal names Alan and Alain (from Latin Alanus) may have been introduced by Alan settlers to Western Europe during the first millennium.

The Alans were also known over the course of their history by another group of related names including the variations Asi, As, and Os (Romanian Iasi or Olani, Bulgarian Uzi, Hungarian Jász, Russian Jasy, Georgian Osi). It is this name at the root of the modern Ossetian.

== The Alans and warfare ==
The Alans were famed for their elite and highly mobile cavalry, a fighting style they inherited from their Sarmatian relatives. The Alans' influence on mounted warfare was widespread, with their tactics and equipment impacting the Roman and Germanic armies, among others.

Alani boys learned to ride at a young age, and Roman writer Ammianus Marcellinus remarked that walking was considered offensive for an Alanic man. A hallmark Alanic tactic, the feigned retreat was designed to draw enemy infantry into a vulnerable position. Alani horsemen would pretend to flee before suddenly wheeling around to attack the enemy's exposed flank.

As mercenaries for the Romans and other powers, the Alans demonstrated a sophisticated understanding of combined-arms tactics. Their missile-equipped cavalry would harry the enemy, pinning them in place before the shock cavalry delivered a devastating charge.

Alani cavalry was highly mobile and was used for rapid skirmishing and opportunistic attacks against enemy flanks. The mobility of their cavalry and the psychological terror they inspired in less disciplined infantry were major advantages.

The Alans were recruited into the Mongol forces and known as the Asud, with one unit called "Right Alan Guard" that was combined with "recently surrendered" soldiers.

== History ==
=== Origin ===
The Alans were formed out of the merger of the Massagetae, a Central Asian Iranian nomadic people, with some old tribal groups. Related to the Asii who previously invaded Bactria in the 2nd century BC, the Alans were pushed west by the Kangju people (known to Graeco-Roman authors as the Ἰαξάρται Iaxártai in Greek, and the Iaxartae in Latin), the latter of whom were living in the Syr Darya basin, from where they expanded their rule from Fergana to the Aral Sea region.

=== Early Alans ===
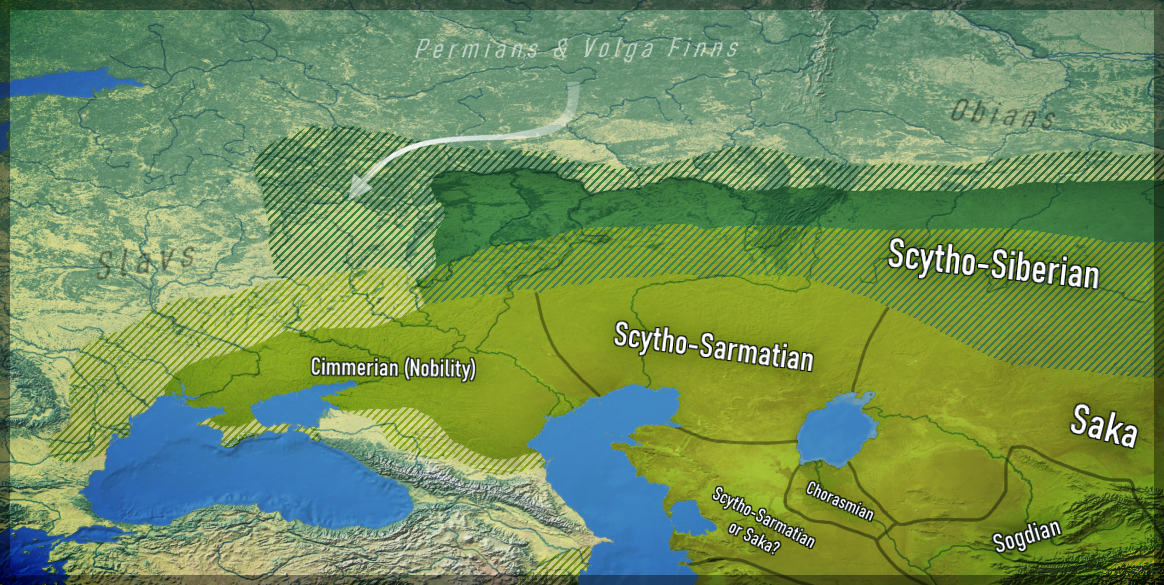
Scythians and related Northeastern Iranic peoples in the Iron Age highlighted in green.

Europe, 117–138, when the Alani were concentrated north of the Caucasus Mountains (centre right).

The first mentions of names that historians link with the Alani appear at almost the same time in texts from the Mediterranean, Middle East and China.

In the 1st century, the Alans migrated westwards from Central Asia, achieving a dominant position among the Sarmatians living between the Don River and the Caspian Sea. The Alans are mentioned in the Vologases inscription which reads that Vologases I, the Parthian king between around 45 and 78, in the 11th year of his reign (62), battled Kuluk, king of the Alani. Regarding the Alan invasion of Parthia, the 1st century Jewish historian Josephus supplements this inscription. Josephus reports in the Jewish Wars (book 7, ch. 7.4) how Alans (whom he calls a "Scythian" tribe) living near the Sea of Azov crossed the Iron Gates for plunder (72 CE) and defeated the armies of Pacorus, king of Media, and Tiridates, King of Armenia, two brothers of Vologases I (for whom the above-mentioned inscription was made):

Now there was a nation of the Alans, which we have formerly mentioned somewhere as being Scythians, and living around Tanais and Lake Maeotis. This nation about this time laid a design of falling upon Media, and the parts beyond it, in order to plunder them; with which intention they treated with the king of Hyrcania; for he was master of that passage which king Alexander shut up with iron gates. This king gave them leave to come through them; so they came in great multitudes, and fell upon the Medes unexpectedly, and plundered their country, which they found full of people, and replenished with abundance of cattle, while nobody dared make any resistance against them; for Pacorus, the king of the country, had fled away for fear into places where they could not easily come at him, and had yielded up everything he had to them, and had only saved his wife and his concubines from them, and that with difficulty also, after they had been made captives, by giving a hundred talents for their ransom. These Alans therefore plundered the country without opposition, and with great ease, and proceeded as far as Armenia, laying waste all before them. Now, Tiridates was king of that country, who met them and fought them but was lucky not to have been taken alive in the battle; for a certain man threw a noose over him and would soon have drawn him in, had he not immediately cut the cord with his sword and escaped. So the Alans, being still more provoked by this sight, laid waste the country, and drove a great multitude of the men, and a great quantity of the other booty from both kingdoms, along with them, and then retreated back to their own country.

The fact that the Alans invaded Parthia through Hyrcania shows that at the time many Alans were still based north-east of the Caspian Sea. By the early 2nd century the Alans were in firm control of the Lower Volga and Kuban. These lands had earlier been occupied by the Aorsi and the Siraces, whom the Alans apparently absorbed, dispersed and/or destroyed, since they were no longer mentioned in contemporaneous accounts. It is likely that the Alans' influence stretched further westwards, encompassing most of the Sarmatian world, which by then possessed a relatively homogenous culture.

In 135 CE, the Alans made a huge raid into Asia Minor via the Caucasus, ravaging Media and Armenia. They were eventually driven back by Arrian, the governor of Cappadocia, who wrote a detailed report (Ektaxis kata Alanoon or 'War Against the Alans') that is a major source for studying Roman military tactics.

From 215 to 250, the Germanic Goths expanded south-eastwards and broke the Alan dominance on the Pontic Steppe. The Alans however seem to have had a significant influence on the culture of the Goths, who became excellent horsemen and adopted the Alanic animal style art. (The Roman Empire, during the chaos of the 3rd century civil wars, suffered damaging raids by the Gothic armies with their heavy cavalry before the Illyrian Emperors adapted to the Gothic tactics, reorganized and expanded the Roman heavy cavalry, and defeated the Goths under Gallienus, Claudius II and Aurelian.)

After the Gothic entry to the steppe, many of the Alans seem to have retreated eastwards towards the Don, where they seem to have established contacts with the Huns. Ammianus writes that the Alans were "somewhat like the Huns, but in their manner of life and their habits they are less savage." Jordanes contrasted them with the Huns, noting that the Alans "were their equals in battle, but unlike them in their civilisation, manners and appearance". In the late 4th century, Vegetius conflates Alans and Huns in his military treatise – Hunnorum Alannorumque natio, the "nation of Huns and Alans" – and collocates Goths, Huns and Alans, exemplo Gothorum et Alannorum Hunnorumque.

The 4th century Roman historian Ammianus Marcellinus noted that the Alans were "formerly called Massagetae," while Dio Cassius wrote that "they are Massagetae." It is likely that the Alans were an amalgamation of various Iranian peoples, including Sarmatians, Massagetae and Sakas. Scholars have connected the Alans to the nomadic state of Yancai mentioned in Chinese sources. The Yancai are first mentioned in connection with late 2nd century BC diplomat Zhang Qian's travels in Chapter 123 of Shiji (whose author, Sima Qian, died c. 90 BC). The Yancai of Chinese records has again been equated with the Aorsi, a powerful Sarmatian tribe living between the Don River and the Aral Sea, mentioned in Roman records, in particular Strabo.

=== Link to Chinese chronicles ===
The Later Han dynasty Chinese chronicle, the Hou Hanshu, 88 (covering the period 25–220 and completed in the 5th century), mentioned a report that the Yancai nation (奄蔡 lit "Vast Steppes" or "Extensive Grasslands" < LHC *ʔɨam^{B}-sɑ^{C}; a.k.a. Hesu (闔蘇), compare Latin Abzoae, identified with the Aorsi (Ancient Greek Αορσιοι)) had become a vassal state of the Kangju and was now known as Alan (< LHC: *ʔɑ-lɑn 阿蘭) (Note: According to Chavannes (1907), Weilüe correctly states that Yancai's alternative name is simply 阿蘭 Ālán instead of 阿蘭聊 Ālánliáo as recorded in Book of Later Han; as 聊 Liáo looks similar to 柳 Liǔ, the name of a separate country already mentioned before 岩 Yán & 阿蘭 Ālán.)

Y. A. Zadneprovskiy suggests that the Kangju subjugation of Yancai occurred in the 1st century BC, and that this subjugation caused various Sarmatian tribes, including the Aorsi, to migrate westwards, which played a major role in starting the Migration Period. The 3rd century Weilüe also notes that Yancai was then known to be Alans, although they were no longer vassals of the Kangju.

Dutch Sinologist A. F. P. Hulsewé noted that:

Chavannes (1905), p. 558, note 5, approves of the identification of Yen-ts’ai with the ‘Αορσοι mentioned by Strabo, as proposed by Hirth (1885), p. 139, note 1; he believes this identification to be strengthened by the later name Alan, which explains Ptolemy's "Alanorsi". Marquart (1905), pp. 240–241, did not accept this identification, but Pulleyblank (1963), pp. 99 and 220, does, referring for additional support to HSPC 70.6b where the name Ho-su 闔蘇, reconstructed in ‘Old Chinese’ as ĥa̱p-sa̱ĥ, can be compared with Abzoae found in Pliny VI, 38 (see also Pulleyblank (1968), p. 252). Also Humbach (1969), pp. 39–40, accepts the identification, though with some reserve.

=== Migration to Gaul ===
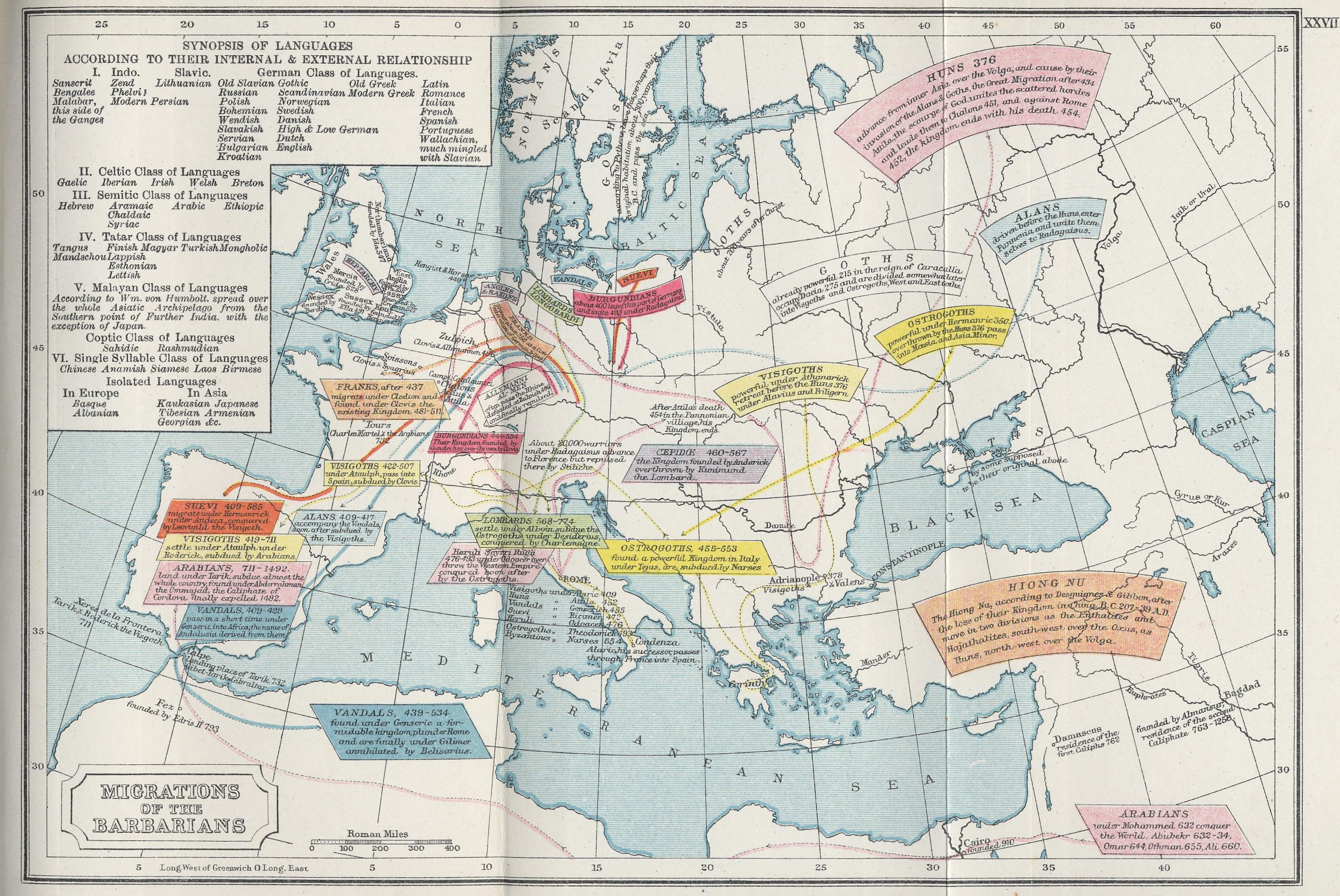
The migrations of the Alans during the 4th–5th centuries, from their homeland in the North Caucasus

Around 370, according to Ammianus, the peaceful relations between the Alans and Huns were broken, after the Huns attacked the Don Alans, killing many of them and establishing an alliance with the survivors. These Alans successfully invaded the Goths in 375 together with the Huns. They subsequently accompanied the Huns in their westward expansion.

Following the Hunnic invasion in 370, other Alans, along with other Sarmatians, migrated westward. One of these Alan groups fought together with the Goths in the decisive Battle of Adrianople in 378 CE, in which emperor Valens was killed. As the Roman Empire continued to decline, the Alans split into various groups; some fought for the Romans while others joined the Huns, Visigoths or Ostrogoths. A portion of the western Alans joined the Vandals and the Suebi in their invasion of Roman Gaul. Gregory of Tours mentions in his Liber historiae Francorum ("Book of Frankish History") that the Alan king Respendial saved the day for the Vandals in an armed encounter with the Franks at the crossing of the Rhine on 31 December 406. According to Gregory, another group of Alans, led by Goar, crossed the Rhine at the same time, but immediately joined the Romans and settled in Gaul.

Under Beorgor (Beorgor rex Alanorum), they moved throughout Gaul, till the reign of Petronius Maximus, when they crossed the Alps in the winter of 464, into Liguria, but were there defeated, and Beorgor slain, by Ricimer, commander of the Emperor's forces.

In 442, after it became clear to Aetius that he could no longer rely upon the Huns for support, he turned to Goar and persuaded him to move some of his people to settlements in the Orleanais in order to control the bacaudae of Armorica and to keep the Visigoths from expanding their territories northward across the Loire. Goar settled a substantial number of his followers in the Orleanais and the area to the north and personally moved his own capital to the city of Orleans.

Under Goar, they allied with the Burgundians led by Gundaharius, with whom they installed the Emperor Jovinus as usurper. Under Goar's successor Sangiban, the Alans of Orléans played a critical role in repelling the invasion of Attila the Hun at the Battle of Châlons. In 463 the Alans defeated the Goths at the battle of Orléans, and they later defeated the Franks led by Childeric in 466. Around 502–503 Clovis attacked Armorica but was defeated by the Alans. However, the Alans, who were Chalcedonian Christians like Clovis, desired cordial relations with him to counterbalance the hostile Arian Visigoths who coveted the land north of the Loire. Therefore, an accord was arranged by which Clovis came to rule the various peoples of Armorica and the military strength of the area was integrated into the Merovingian military.

=== Hispania and Africa ===
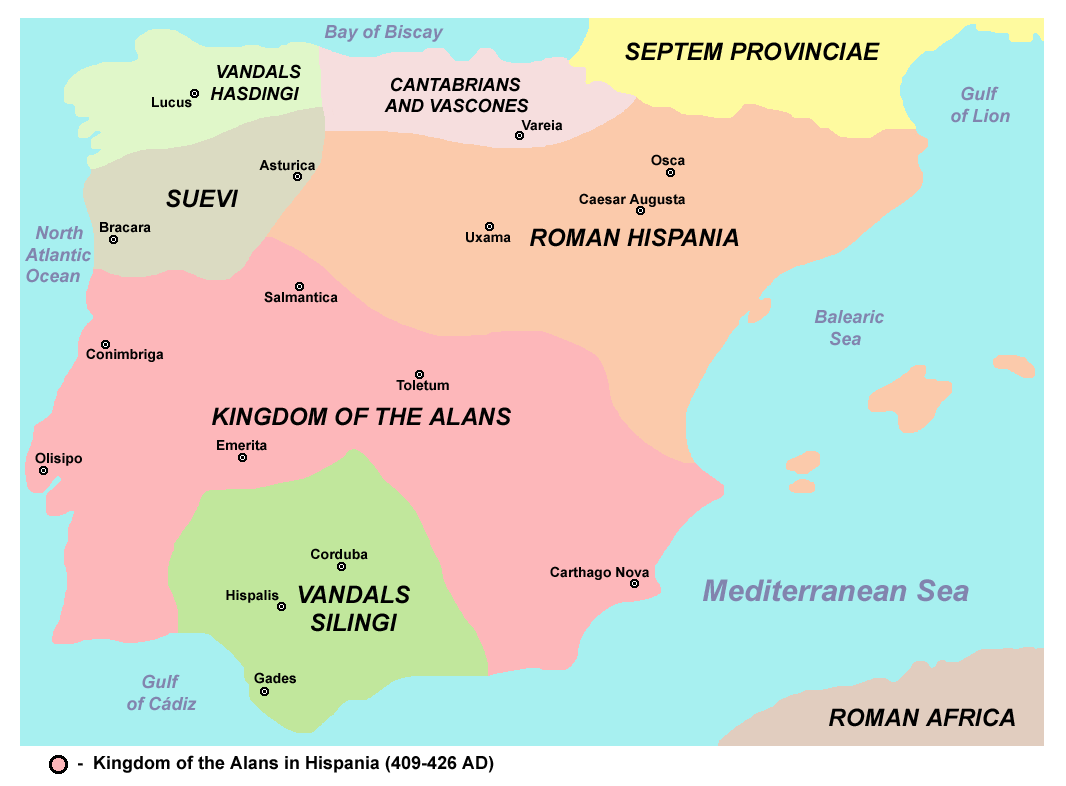
Kingdom of the Alans in Hispania (409–426).

Following the fortunes of the Vandals and Suebi into the Iberian Peninsula (Hispania, comprising modern Portugal and Spain) in 409, the Alans led by Respendial settled in the provinces of Lusitania and Carthaginensis. The Kingdom of the Alans was among the first Barbarian kingdoms to be founded. The Siling Vandals settled in Baetica, the Suebi in coastal Gallaecia, and the Asding Vandals in the rest of Gallaecia. Although the newcomers controlled Hispania they were still a tiny minority among a larger Hispano-Roman population, approximately 200,000 out of 6,000,000.

In 418 (or 426 according to some authors), the Alan king, Attaces, was killed in battle against the Visigoths, and this branch of the Alans subsequently appealed to the Asding Vandal king Gunderic to accept the Alan crown. The separate ethnic identity of Respendial's Alans dissolved. Although some of these Alans are thought to have remained in Iberia, most went to North Africa with the Vandals in 429. Later the rulers of the Vandal Kingdom in North Africa styled themselves Rex Wandalorum et Alanorum ("King of the Vandals and Alans").

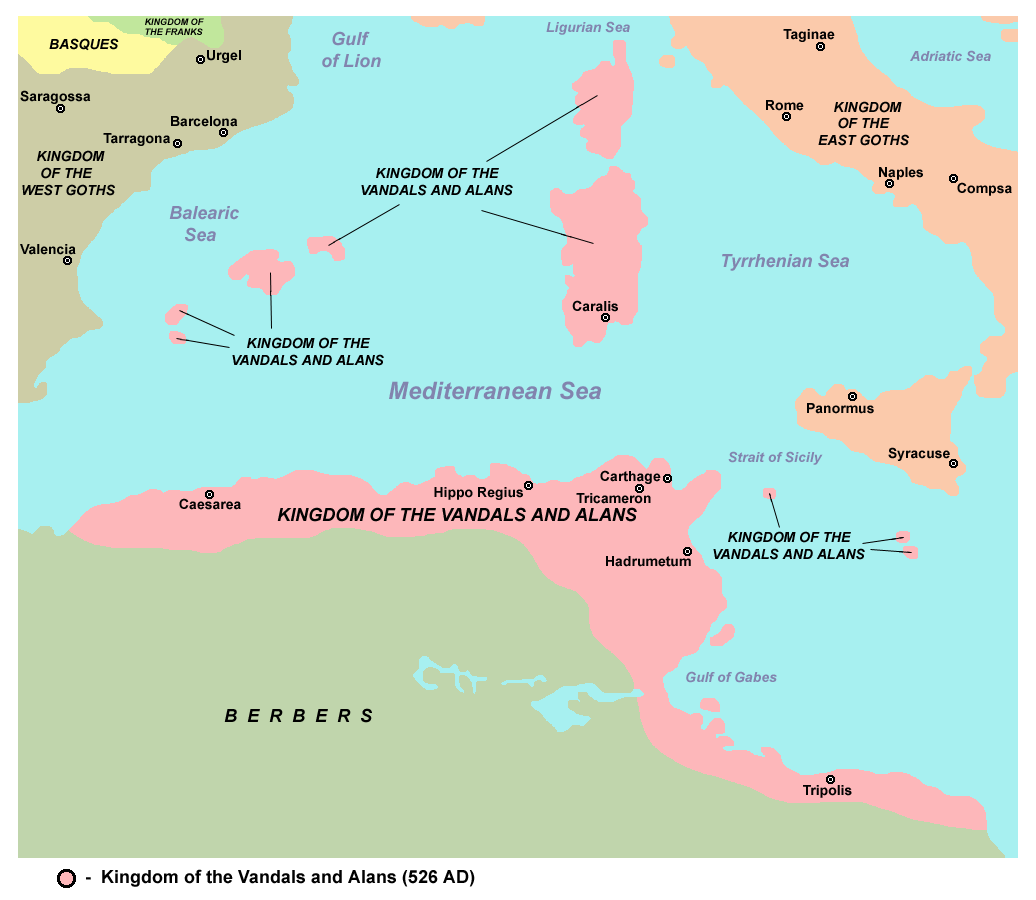
Kingdom of the Vandals and Alans in North Africa (526).

There are some vestiges of the Alans in Portugal, namely in Alenquer (whose name may be Germanic for the Temple of the Alans, from "Alan Kerk", and whose castle may have been established by them; the Alaunt is still represented in that city's coat of arms), in the construction of the castles of Torres Vedras and Almourol, and in the city walls of Lisbon, where vestiges of their presence may be found under the foundations of the Church of Santa Luzia.

In the Iberian peninsula the Alans settled in Lusitania (Alentejo) and the Cartaginense provinces. They became known in retrospect for their massive hunting and fighting running mastiff-type dogs, the Alaunt, which they apparently introduced to Europe. The breed is extinct, but its name is carried by a Spanish breed of dog still called Alano, traditionally used in boar hunting and cattle herding. The Alano name, however, has historically been used for a number of dog breeds in a few European countries thought to descend from the original dog of the Alans, such as the German mastiff (Great Dane) and the French Dogue de Bordeaux, among others.

Y-DNA consistent with the Alans can still be found in these regions, mainly around the District of Portalegre.

=== Medieval Alania ===
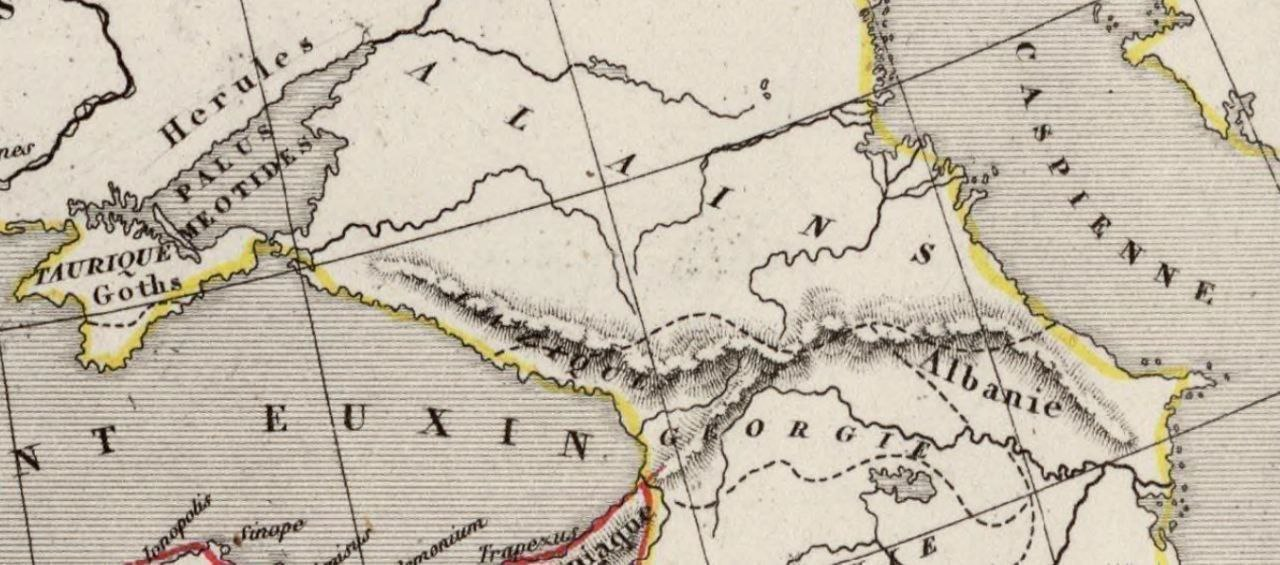
Map of Alania in IV Century.

The Alans who remained in their original area of settlement north of the Caucasus (and for a time east of the Caspian Sea as well), came into contact and conflict with the Bulgars, the Gökturks, and the Khazars, who drove most of them from the plains and into the mountains.

The Alans converted to Byzantine Orthodoxy in the first quarter of the 10th century, during the patriarchate of Nicholas I Mystikos. Al-Mas‘udi reports that they apostasized in 932, but this seems to have been short-lived. The Alans are collectively mentioned as Byzantine-rite Christians in the 13th century. The Caucasian Alans were the ancestors of the modern Ossetians, whose ethnonym derives from the name Ās (very probably the ancient Aorsi; al-Ma'sudi mentions al-Arsiyya as guards among the Khazars, and the Rus' called the Alans Yasi), a sister tribe of the Alans. The Armenian Geography uses the name Ashtigor for the most westerly located Alans, a name which survives as Digor and still refers to the western division of the Ossetians. Furthermore, in Ossetian, Asi refers to the region around Mount Elbrus, where they probably formerly lived. In the territory from Urukh to Mount Elbrus, a sufficient number of Ossetian toponyms have been preserved up until the 20th century.

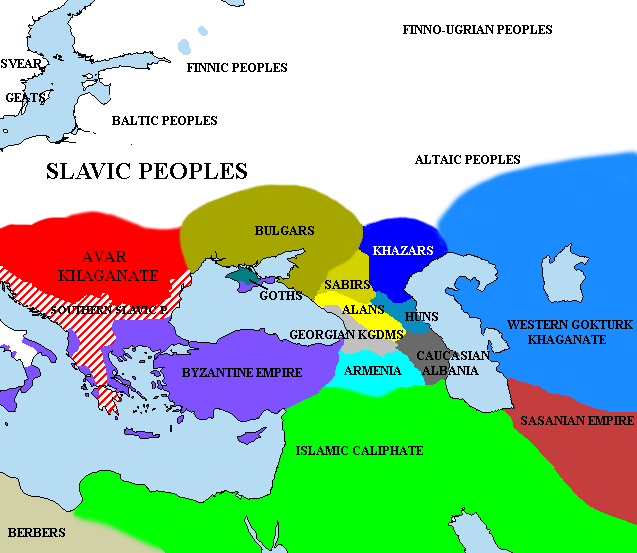
The Pontic steppe in c. 650

Some of the other Alans remained under the rule of the Huns. Those of the eastern division, though dispersed about the steppes until late medieval times, were forced by the Mongols into the Caucasus, where they remain as the Ossetians. Between the 9th and 12th centuries, they formed a network of tribal alliances that gradually evolved into the Christian kingdom of Alania. Most Alans submitted to the Mongol Empire in 1239–1277. They participated in Mongol invasions of Europe and the Song dynasty in Southern China, and the Battle of Kulikovo under Mamai of the Golden Horde.

In 1253, the Franciscan friar William of Rubruck reported numerous Europeans in Central Asia. It is also known that 30,000 Alans formed the royal guard (Asud) of the Yuan court in Dadu (Beijing). Marco Polo later reported their role in the Yuan dynasty in his book Il Milione. It is said that those Alans contributed to a modern Mongol clan, Asud. John of Montecorvino, archbishop of Dadu (Khanbaliq), reportedly converted many Alans to Roman Catholic Christianity in addition to Armenians in China. In Poland and Lithuania, Alans were also part of the powerful Clan of Ostoja.

According to the missionary Giovanni da Pian del Carpine, a part of the Alans had successfully resisted a Mongol siege on a mountain for 12 years:

When they (the Mongols) begin to besiege a fortress, they besiege it for many years, as it happens today with one mountain in the land of the Alans. We believe they have been besieging it for twelve years and they (the Alans) put up courageous resistance and killed many Tatars, including many noble ones.

— Giovanni da Pian del Carpine, report from 1250

This twelve-year-long siege is not found in any other report, however the Russian historian A. I. Krasnov connected this battle with two Chechen folktales he recorded in 1967 that spoke of an old hunter named Idig who with his companions defended the Dakuoh mountain for 12 years against Tatar-Mongols. He also reported to have found several arrowheads and spears from the 13th century near the very mountain the battle took place at:

Against the Alans and the Cumans (Kipchaks), the Mongols used divide-and-conquer tactics by first telling the Cumans to stop allying with the Alans and, after the Cumans followed their suggestion, the Mongols then attacked the Cumans after defeating the Alans. Alans were recruited into the Mongol forces with one unit called "Right Alan Guard" which was combined with "recently surrendered" soldiers, Mongols, and Chinese soldiers stationed in the area of the former Kingdom of Qocho and in Besh Balikh the Mongols established a Chinese military colony led by Chinese general Qi Kongzhi (Ch'i Kung-chih). Alan and Kipchak guards were used by Kublai Khan. In 1368 at the end of the Yuan dynasty in China Toghan Temür was accompanied by his faithful Alan guards. Mangu enlisted in his bodyguard half the troops of the Alan prince, Arslan, whose younger son Nicholas took a part in the expedition of the Mongols against Karajang (Yunnan). This Alan imperial guard was still in existence in 1272, 1286 and 1309, and it was divided into two corps with headquarters in the Ling pei province (Karakorúm). The French-Flemish friar and traveler William of Rubruck mentions Alans numerous times in the account of his 1253–1255 journey through Eurasia to the Great Khan, e.g. Alans living as Mongol subjects in Crimea, Old Astrakhan, the Khan's capital Karakorum, and also still as freemen in their Caucasian homeland ("the Alans or Aas, who are Christians and still fight the Tartars"). The reason why the earlier Persian word tersa was gradually abandoned by the Mongols in favour of the Syro-Greek word arkon, when speaking of Christians, manifestly is that no specifically Greek Church was ever heard of in China until the Russians had been conquered; besides, there were large bodies of Russian and Alan guards at Peking throughout the last half of the thirteenth and first half of the 14th century, and the Catholics there would not be likely to encourage the use of a Persian word which was most probably applicable in the first instance to the Nestorians they found so degenerated. The Alan guards converted to Catholicism as reported by Odorico. They were a "Russian guard".

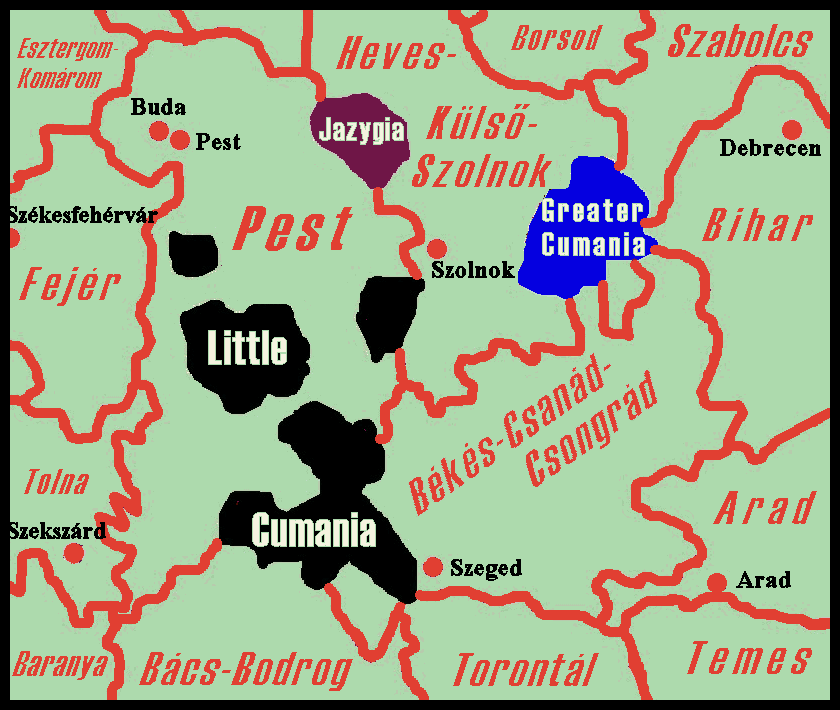
Jazygia, inhabited by the Jassic people, in the 18th century within the Kingdom of Hungary.

In 1277 Mengu-Timur sent an expedition against the rebellious Alans in the city of Dedyakov. As a result of the campaign, the city was burned. According to many researchers, Dedyakov was located on the territory of the capital of North Ossetia - Vladikavkaz.

It is believed that some Alans resettled to the North (Barsils), merging with Volga Bulgars and Burtas, eventually transforming to Volga Tatars. It is supposed that the Iasians, a group of Alans founded a market in the northeast of Romania (about 1200–1300), near the Prut river, later called Iași town. The latter became the capital of Moldavia in the Middle Ages. Classical Alania finally ceased to exist at the end of the 14th century, when Tamerlane invaded. After defeating the Golden Horde in the Battle of the Terek River in 1395, he subsequently attacked several Alanians leaders, leading to months of slaughter and enslavement, which are still remembered in a popular Ossetian folk song called "mother of Zadaleska". Tamerlane's invasion led to the Alans fleeing into the depths of the Caucasus Mountains and the end of the Alans' presence in the steppes north of the Caucasus, which is preserved in the Digorian legends. Alan mercenaries were involved in the affair with the Catalan Company.

== Genetics ==
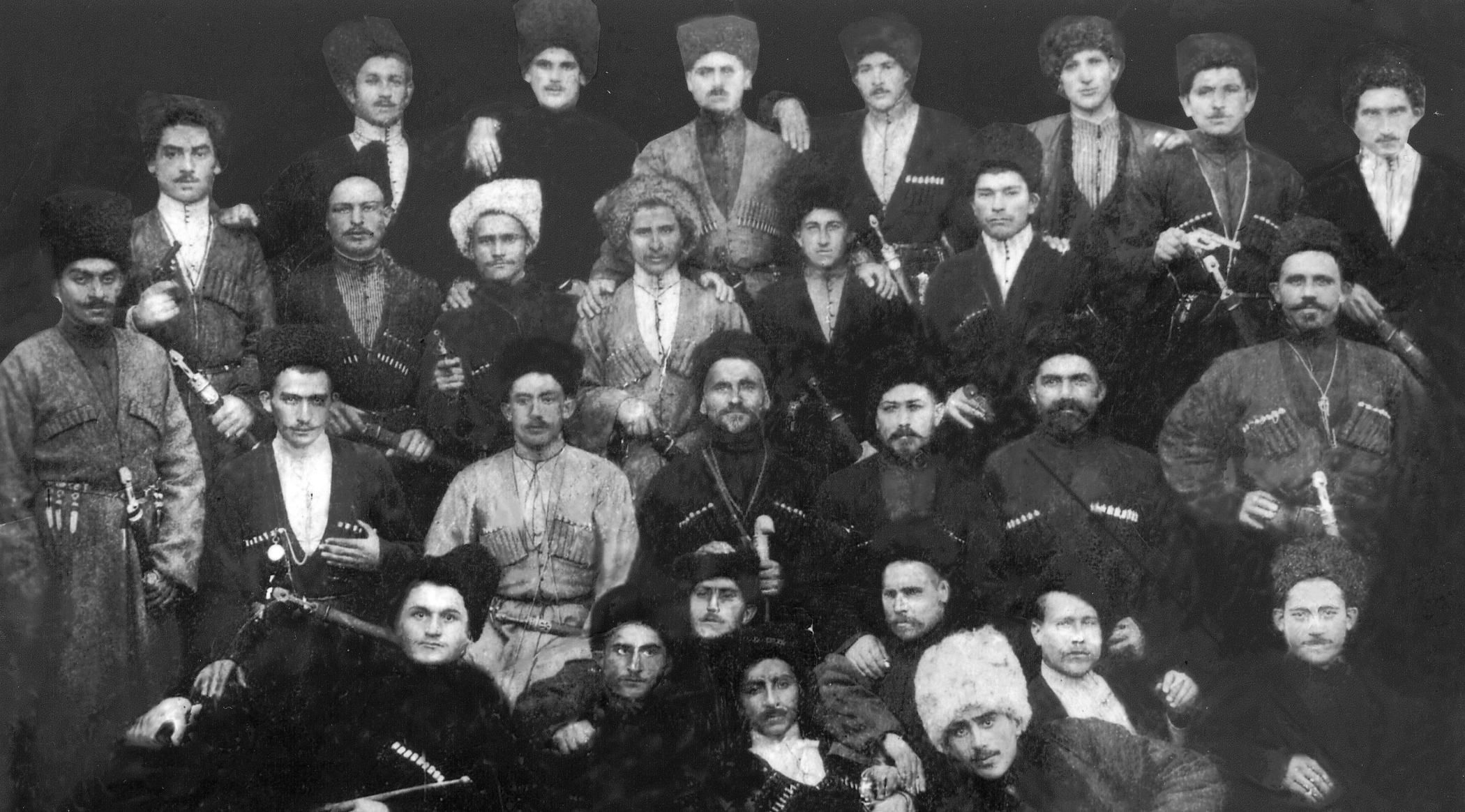
Ossetians

In a study conducted in 2014 by V. V. Ilyinskyon on bone fragments from 10 Alanic burials on the Don River, DNA could be abstracted from a total of seven. Four of them turned out to belong to yDNA Haplogroup G2 and six of them had mtDNA I. The fact that many of the samples share the same y- and mtDNA raises the possibility that the tested individuals belonged to the same tribe or even were close relatives. Nevertheless this supports the argument for a direct Alan ancestry of Ossetians, competing with the hypothesis that Ossetians are Alanized Caucasic-speakers, as the main haplogroup among Ossetians is also G2.

In 2015, the Institute of Archaeology in Moscow conducted research on various Sarmato-Alan and Saltovo-Mayaki culture Kurgan burials. In this analysis, the two Alan samples from the 4th to 6th century had yDNAs G2a-P15 and R1a-z94, while from the three Sarmatian samples from 2nd to 3rd century two had yDNA J1-M267 and one possessed R1a. Also, the three Saltovo-Mayaki samples from 8th to 9th century turned out to have yDNAs G, J2a-M410 and R1a-z94 respectively.

A genetic study published in Nature in May 2018 examined the remains of six Alans buried in the Caucasus from c. 100 to 1400. The sample of Y-DNA extracted belonged to haplogroup R1 and haplogroup Q-M242. One of the Q-M242 samples found in Beslan, North Ossetia from 200 found 4 relatives among Chechens from the Shoanoy Teip. The samples of mtDNA extracted belonged to HV2a1, U4d3, X2f, H13a2c, H5, and W1.

== Archaeology ==
Archaeological finds support the written sources. P. D. Rau (1927) first identified late Sarmatian sites with the historical Alans. Based on the archaeological material, they were one of the Iranian-speaking nomadic tribes that began to enter the Sarmatian area between the middle of the 1st and the 2nd centuries.

== Language ==
The Alans' language, Alanic, was in use for about 12 centuries and used the Greek alphabet. Byzantine Greek sources only recorded small samples.

== Religion ==
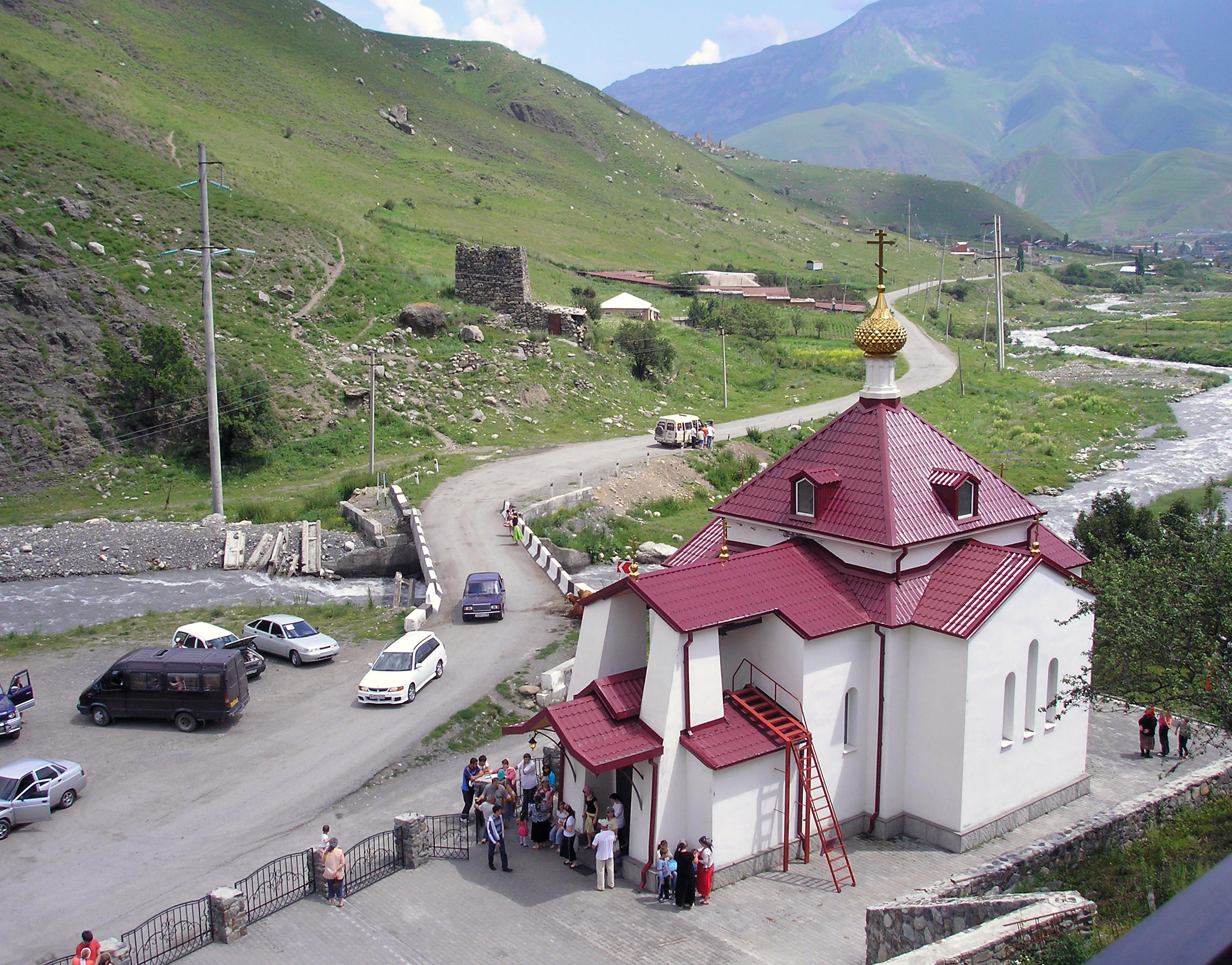
Orthodox church in North Ossetia-Alania

Prior to their Christianisation, the Alans were Indo-Iranian polytheists, subscribing either to the poorly understood Scythian pantheon or to a polytheistic form of Zoroastrianism. Some traditions were directly inherited from the Scythians, like embodying their dominant god in elaborate rituals.

In the 4th–5th centuries the Alans were at least partially Christianized by Byzantine Arian missionaries of the church. The Alans converted to Byzantine Orthodoxy in the first quarter of the 10th century, during the patriarchate of Nicholas I Mystikos. Al-Mas‘udi reports that they apostasized in 932, but this seems to have been short-lived. By the 13th century, most of the urban population of Ossetia gradually became Eastern Orthodox Christian as a result of Georgian missionary work. In the 13th century, invading Mongol hordes pushed the eastern Alans further south into the Caucasus, where they mixed with native Caucasian groups and successively formed three territorial entities each with different developments. Around 1395, Timur's army invaded the Northern Caucasus and massacred much of the Alanian population.

As time went by, Digor in the west came under Kabard and Islamic influence. It was through the Kabardians (an East Circassian tribe) that Islam was introduced into the region in the 17th century. After 1767, all of Alania came under Russian rule, which strengthened Orthodox Christianity in that region considerably. A substantial minority of today's Ossetians are followers of the traditional Ossetian religion, revived in the 1980s as Assianism (Ossetian: Uatsdin – 'True Faith').

== See also ==
- List of ancient Iranian peoples
- Roxolani, possibly a subset of the Alans
- Ossetians
- Jasz people
