= Roman civil war of 456 =

War in the Western Roman Empire

Roman Civil War of 456
- Part of Fall of the Western Roman Empire
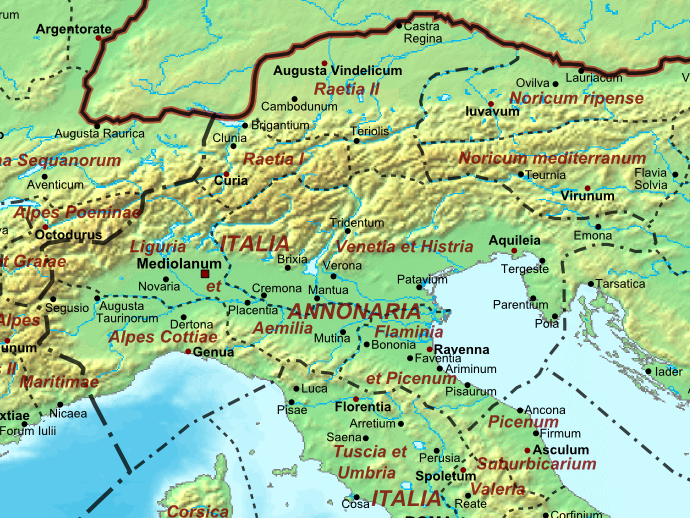
- Northern Italy
Date	456 AD
Location	Northern Italia, Western Roman Empire
Result	Rebel victory

Belligerents
Imperial government	Rebels

Commanders and leaders
Avitus; Remistus; Messianus; Theodoric II; Gondioc	Majorian; Ricimer

Strength
5,000–10,000	15,000

The Roman Civil War of 456 was a civil war fought in the Western Roman Empire during the second half of 456 AD.

The Roman generals Majorian and Ricimer revolted against the Western Roman emperor Avitus who was appointed by the Visigoths after the Sack of Rome in 455. Avitus went to Gaul to gather support for his rule which he lacked from the Roman Senate and people. Avitus was defeated by the stronger rebel army at a battle in Piacenza, deposed as emperor, and died shortly thereafter in mysterious circumstances. Eastern Roman emperor Leo I appointed Majorian and Ricimer as magister militum before Majorian appointed himself Western emperor with support from the Senate and army.

== Sources ==
For the events in the Western Roman Empire in the period after the death of Valentinian III (455), historians have only scarce chronicles and fragments from historiography at their disposal. In addition, the Panegyric of Sidonius Apollinaris about Avitus and his letters provides important information about this phase of Roman rule in the west.

== Background ==
Since its founding in 395 AD, the Western Roman Empire was in a prolonged state of decline, and under pressure from the influx of Germanic and other non-Roman peoples known as the Migration Period. In 442, Emperor Valentinian III negotiated a peace treaty with the Vandal Kingdom of Genseric, one of the Germanic states that was encroaching on the empire. The treaty included a marriage of state between Valentinian's daughter Eudocia and Genseric's son Huneric, though Valentinian was killed in 455 before the marriage could take place. His successor Petronius Maximus, to strengthen his legitimacy as emperor, had Eudocia marry his own son Palladius instead. Genseric proclaimed that their peace treaty was null and void and used it as a casus belli to attack the Romans, which resulted in the Sack of Rome and the death of Maximus.

Avitus, a Gallo-Roman magister militum, was appointed emperor by the Visigothic king Theodoric II in the aftermath. Among historians, there is a consensus that Avitus' reign was not strongly rooted at the beginning. He was rather dependent on the support of all major players in the Western Roman Empire about that time. That support was indispensable to gain sufficient control over both the civil institutions, the Senate and the East Roman Emperor Marcian, as well as those of the army and its commanders, the generals Majorianus and Ricimer. Moreover, his relationship with the eastern part of the empire was not optimal. In contrast, his relationship with Theodoric was excellent. An explanation for Avitus' weak position might be, that he had been put forward by the Gallic senators with support of Theodoric as the successor of Maximus. In Italia, where the core of the power of the Western Empire was established, he was considered as an outsider by the Senate in Rome. According to Sidonius Apollonaris, Majorian and Ricimer were also interested in the throne, and had already had plans in that direction after the death of Valentinian. Initially, they supported Avitus' reign, but turned against him when he got into trouble.

There were two major conflicts at the time of Avitus' reign: the Suebians in northern Hispania were on a warpath, and the Romans were at war with Geiseric since his looting of Rome. The Visigothic army, together with the Burgundy, campaigned for Avitus in Hispania to restore power there. The Roman army under Ricimer took action against the Vandals in the Mediterranean and achieved some successes, but Genseric proved difficult to beat at sea. The Vandals blocked the port of Rome, causing famine to break out in the capital which depended on grain from Africa for its food supply.

== The civil war ==
=== Prelude ===
Halfway through 456, during the food blockade, Avitus stayed in Rome where he was confronted by hungry and dissatisfied residents. The fact that he belonged to the Gallic aristocracy and had appointed several Gauls to high posts worked to his disadvantage. Some senatorial circles blamed him for the famine. In addition, he also had problems with his Roman army because he did not have enough cash to pay their wages. At this stage, Ricimer and Majorian seriously began plans to depose Avitus. Ricimer had gained prestige after his victories and Majorian had a strong following among the troops previously loyal to Flavius Aetius. Avitus, who was never loved much by the Roman people, lost his support in the Senate in the course of 456. For Ricimer and Majorian this was the perfect moment to draw power to them and revolted, causing the emperor to flee because a large part of the army sided against him. Avitus fled to Gaul to gather reinforcements, arriving in Arles where he scraped some troops together, but had to do it without the support of the Theodoric who was campaigning in Hispania.

=== Assassination of Remistus ===
The first action in the revolt of Ricimer and Majorian was the assassination of Avitus' magister militum Remistus, the commander-in-chief of the Roman army, who had been commissioned to preserve the imperial seat Ravenna for him. In September 456, Ricimer went with an army to Ravenna and surprised Remistus near the city. The sources do not clearly indicate under what circumstances the attack took place, but Remistus was killed as a result. Then, the troops of Ricimer and Majorian moved north to intercept the reinforcements Avitus had gathered in Arles.

=== Battle of Piacenza ===
Avitus appointed a new commander-in-chief, Messianus, to succeed Remistus and prepared for the confrontation with Ricimer and Majorian. With the army he gathered in Gaul, he returned to Italia in early October. He encountered the army of Recimer and Majorian near Piacenza where there was a battle between the Roman armies. Avitus was clearly the lesser, lacking the support of the Gothic foederati and possibly could only have gathered part of the established Gallic army in that short time. The rebels, on the other hand, had most of the Italian comitatenses. On October 17 or 18, Avitus attacked the much stronger army led by Ricimer with his troops, and after a major massacre among his men including Messianus, he fled and took refuge in the city. In the immediate aftermath, Ricimer saved his life, but forced him to become Bishop of Piacenza. As for his death shortly after, the sources are vague or contradictory; it is enough to say that this was very convenient for Ricimer and Majorian.

== Aftermath ==
After the deposition and death of Avitus, the Gallo-Roman aristocracy revolted, turning to the Burgundian and Visigothic foederati for support. When Theodoric and Gundioc received the message about the overthrow of Avitus and the revolt in Gaul, Theodoric left the command to his generals Suneric and Cyril and returned to Toulouse, while Gundioc with his entire army returned to the mountains of Sapaudia. Taking advantage of the confusing state, Theodoric saw opportunities to establish his own state on Roman soil. In the course of 457, he pushed the treaty with the Romans on the side with which the Gothic War began.

The recently appointed Eastern Emperor Leo I was now also emperor of the West until he had appointed a successor. Initially, Leo was not inclined to cooperate with the rebellious generals, but due the extremely unstable situation in the West he eventually accepted them. Leo appointed Ricimer as patricius e magister militum (commander-in-chief with the title of Patrician) and Majorian as magister militum, making Majorian the subordinate of Ricimer. Majorian then forced Leo, with the support of the Senate, to appoint him as Caesar on 1 April 457. When Leo hesitated to acknowledge him, Majorian declared himself Emperor of the West on 28 December 457, with the support of the Senate and the army.

== Primary sources ==
- Hydatius, Chronicles 169–174
- Sidonius Apollinaris, panegyric and letters
- John of Antioch, Historia chronike
- Gregory of Tours, Historia Francorum
- Priscus, fragments

== Bibliography ==
- O'Flynn, John Michael (1983), Generalissimos of the Western Roman Empire, The University of Alberta Press, ISBN 0888640315
- Hodgkin, Thomas (2001), The Barbarian Invasions of the Roman Empire, London: The Folio Society
- Heather, Peter (2006), The Fall of the Roman Empire, New York: Oxford University Press, ISBN 9780195325416
