= Cimarrón Uruguayo =

Uruguayan breed of molosser type dog

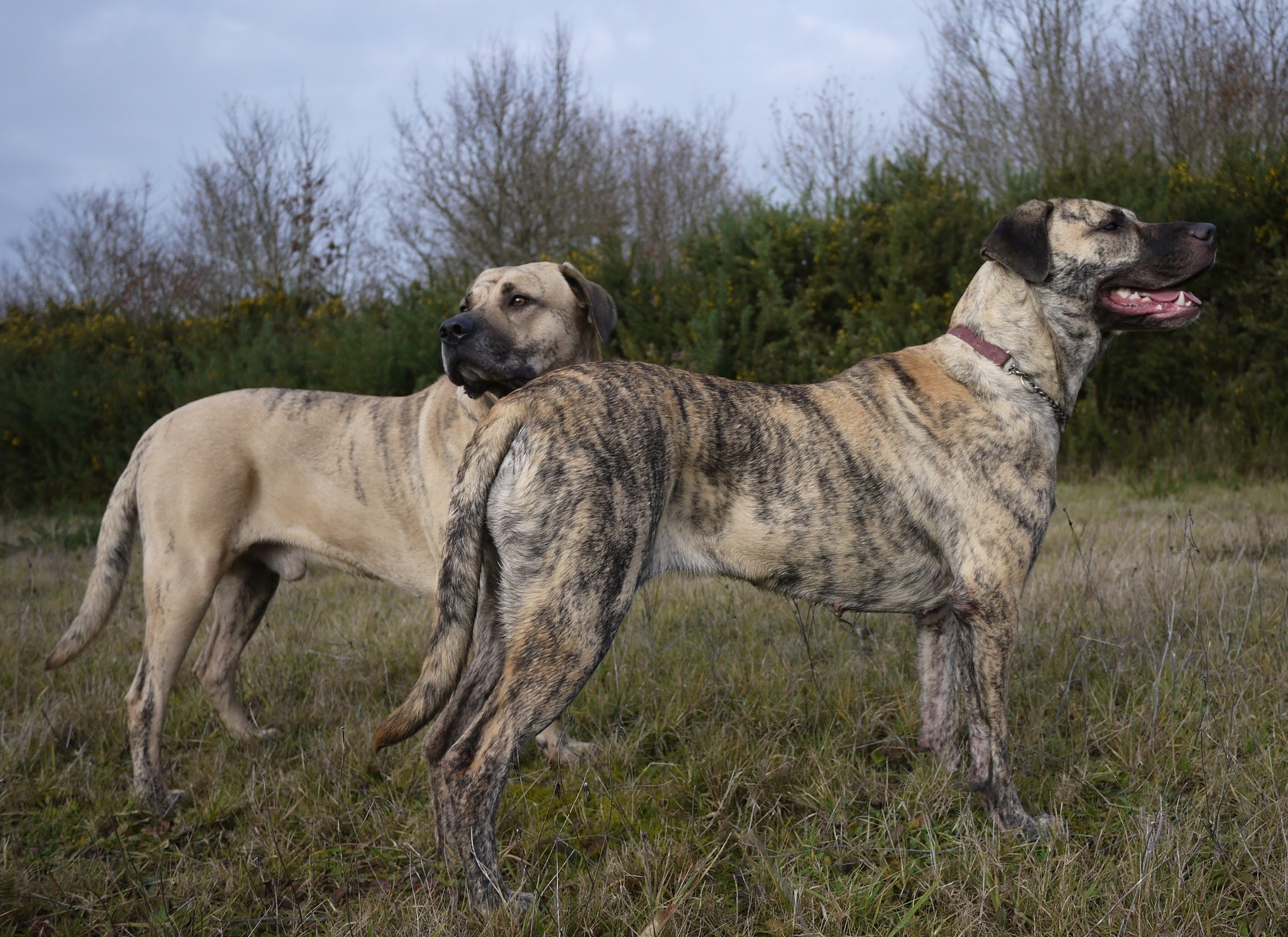
- Other names: Cimarrón, Uruguayan Cimarrón
- Origin: Uruguay
Kennel club standards
- Fédération Cynologique Internationale: standard

The Cimarrón Uruguayo (Uruguayan Cimarrón) is a breed of molosser-type dog originating in Uruguay.

Other names by which it is known in English are Cimarrón, Cimarrón Creole, Cimarrón Dog, Maroon Dog, Cerro Largo Dog, Uruguayan Gaucho Dog, Perro Cimarrón, possibly others. The breed is officially recognised in Uruguay and by the Fédération Cynologique Internationale with the name Cimarrón Uruguayo.

== Appearance ==
The Cimarrón Uruguayo is large in size, compact and muscular. The coat is short and usually brindle but may be a pale yellow ("bayo"), with a black face. Height of males at the withers is from 58 to 61 cm (23 to 24 in) and weight is from 38 to 45 kg (84 to 99 lb). Adult females are slightly smaller.

== Temperament ==
The breed standard states that the dog should have great courage. As with all large dogs, the Cimarrón Uruguayo must be well socialized when very young if it is to be safely kept as a companion. It is a very friendly dog with children and other animals.

The Cimarrón Uruguayo is sometimes used for guarding, hunting, and all dog sports in its native Uruguay. Being a very smart dog it has been used for all kinds of jobs, such as rescue or herding.

It is a rather calm and stable dog and doesn't usually bark unless a threat is real.

== History ==
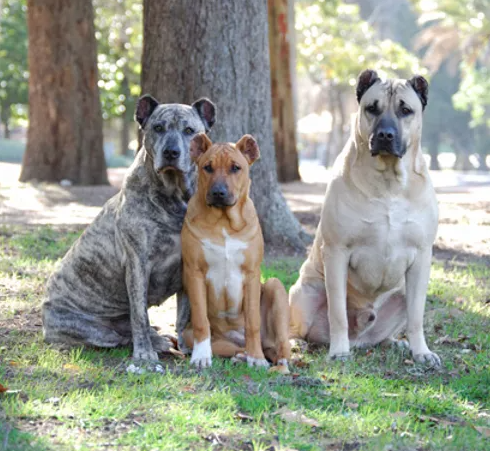
Three exemplars of Cimarrón Uruguayo with different colored coat

The Cimarrón Uruguayo mainly descends from the Alano Español and other European dogs brought by early colonizers and released or abandoned. The dogs adapted to living in the wild in Uruguay and in time became numerous. In the eighteenth century, attacks on livestock and even humans resulted in the dogs being hunted, with bounties paid by the government for each dog killed. However, many remained, especially in the highlands of Cerro Largo. Ranchers in the area would capture and tame the dogs, using them as guard dogs.

The Cimarrón's survival story and fierceness has made it something of a national symbol in Uruguay and the breed is the mascot of the National Army of Uruguay.

The Kennel Club Uruguayo (Uruguayan national kennel club) recognised the Cimarrón Uruguayo after some twenty years of work by fanciers and breeders in documenting the breed. In addition, genetic studies are being done on the breed by the Universidad de la Republica Oriental del Uruguay college of Veterinary Medicine.

The Cimarrón Uruguayo was provisionally recognised by the Fédération Cynologique Internationale on February 21, 2006, and definitively on November 7, 2017, in Group 2, Section 2 Molossoid breeds-Mastiff type. The breed has been exported to the United States, and is recognised there by the United Kennel Club in the Guardian Dog Group.

== Health ==
The Cimarrón Uruguayo should be tested for hip and elbow dysplasia before breeding.

Often the ears are cropped short when the dogs are very young. This is alleged to be in homage to the days when they were hunted (the ears were presented for the bounty). Most fighting dog breeds have their ears cropped.

== See also ==
- List of dog breeds
- Cimarron people (Panama)
- Alano Español
- Cordoba Fighting Dog
