= Battle of Bergamo =

464 battle

Battle of Bergomum
Date	464
Location	Bergomum, (modern Bergamo, Italy)
Result	Roman victory

Belligerents
Alans	Western Roman Empire

Commanders and leaders
Beorgor †	Ricimer

Strength
Unknown	Unknown

Casualties and losses
Unknown	Unknown

The Battle of Bergomum was fought between Alans and the Western Roman Empire in 464, and resulted in a Roman victory.

In 464, the Alan king Beorgor led an invasion of Northern Italy, marching his force into the Po Valley. At Bergomum, near Mediolanum, Beorgor was confronted by the Roman general Ricimer on 6 February 464. After fierce fighting, the Alans were defeated and Beorgor was killed.

== Sources ==
- Jaques, Tony (2007). Dictionary of Battles and Sieges: A-E. Greenwood Publishing Group. ISBN 978-0313335372.
- John of Antioch, 7th-century chronicle.
