= Becerrillo =

Castilian attack dog during the time of the Spanish conquistadores

Becerrillo or Bezerrillo (meaning "Little Bull Calf") was the name of a Castilian attack dog during the time of the Spanish conquistadors.

== Early life ==
Becerrillo's date and place of birth are unknown although historians speculate he may have been whelped in either the kennels of Diego Columbus or those of Juan Ponce de León. A black eyed, medium-sized dog with a red coloured coat, it is recorded that he was in Puerto Rico in 1511 already sporting battle scars. Historical records indicate he may have been an Alano Español.

The dog was owned by Ponce de León. When he was busy with his duties as the governor of Puerto Rico, Becerrillo was often entrusted to the care of Captain Diego Guilarte de Salazar, a man known for his ruthless tactics and shrewd strategy. He would use Becerrillo to attack natives who defied the conquistadors, attempting to terrorize them into accepting the rule of the Spanish invaders.

Becerrillo was especially well known due to the sheer number of victims that he mauled and killed. While Ponce de León was on the island San Juan in 1509, it was common to use attack dogs to subjugate the Indian natives.

== Legends ==
During one specific battle in which the natives launched a surprise attack against the village where the Spanish troops led by Guilarte de Salazar were encamped, Becerrillo alerted the conquistadors by barking until they awoke. Guilarte de Salazar entered the battle with the dog at his side. During the course of the half-hour-long battle, Becerrillo alone killed thirty-three of the native attackers.

The reputation of the killer dog spread. He became more feared than the men he fought alongside. The dog was accomplished at finding and instilling fear in the Indians and able to do the work of fifty soldiers. He was fed the same rations as the men and paid a wage.

Another story finds the Spanish conquistadors outside the capital of Puerto Rico at the time, Caparra, where a group of Indians had been captured and subdued. While waiting for Ponce de León to arrive from the capital, the troops amused themselves by harassing the captives. Guilarte de Salazar gave an old Indian woman a folded piece of paper and informed her that it was a letter that was to be carried to the governor- if she refused, she would be fed to the dogs.

The frightened woman accepted in the hopes of surviving, but after she turned and began down the road Salazar released Becerrillo and commanded him to take her. As she was charged by the dog, the old woman dropped to her knees and prayed "Please, my Lord Dog. I am on my way to take this letter to Christians. I beg you, my Lord Dog, please do not hurt me."

According to witnesses, Becerrillo stopped short and regarded the woman intently. He sniffed at the woman and the paper in her hands, before turning away, lifting a leg, and marking her with urine. He stood by as the woman returned unharmed to the Spanish troops. Upon his arrival, Ponce de León was informed of what had occurred. He commanded the troops, "Free her and send her safely back to her people. Then let us leave this place for now. I will not permit the compassion and forgiveness of a dog to outshine that of a true Christian."

== Death ==
Becerrillo died in 1514. He had been in pursuit of some troops through a river but was wounded by their arrows. Normally his body was protected from injury by a padded jacket but it is not known if it was worn that day.

His handlers were convinced that their opponents considered Becerrillo indestructible so they buried him in an unmarked grave in the belief that the natives would not learn of his death. Becerrillo had sired a son, Leoncillo (meaning "Little Lion"), who had the same ferocious temperament and skills as his father. Ponce de León gave the puppy to Vasco Núñez de Balboa who was accompanied by Leoncillo in his battles on the Isthmus of Panama in 1513.
