= Remistus =

Magister militum in 456

- Born: before 437; Gaul, Western Roman Empire
- Died: 17 September 456 (aged at least 20); Ravenna, Western Roman Empire
- Cause of death: Execution
- Military career
- Rank: Magister militum
- Known for: First Visigothic Magister militum
- Conflicts: Roman civil war of 456

Remistus (died 17 September 456) was a general of the Western Roman Empire and commander-in-chief of the army under Emperor Avitus.

== Life ==
Remistus was a Goth, as shown by his Germanic name. In 456 Remistus reached a high military rank under Emperor Avitus, who probably appointed him magister militum, and received the rank of patricius: he was the first magister militum since the death of Aetius in 454 and the first barbarian commander-in-chief of the Roman army.

The newly appointed general took up residence in Ravenna, the capital, with a group of Goths. That same year Avitus, who was opposed by the Roman Senate, decided to leave Italy and go to his native Gaul to gather reinforcements; Remistus remained back to control Italy. He clashed with the Senate army, led by the Italian magister militum Ricimer and was forced to return to Ravenna; besieged, he was captured and put to death in the Palace in Classis, just outside the city, on September 17.

The following month, Avitus was deposed and later died.

== Bibliography ==
- Fasti vindobonenses priores, 579; Auctarium Prosperi Havniense, 1.
- Theophanes the Confessor, AM 5948
- Martindale, John R., ed. (1980). "Remistus". The Prosopography of the Later Roman Empire: Volume II, AD 395–527. Cambridge: Cambridge University Press. p. 939. ISBN 0-521-20159-4.
- Mathisen, Ralph W., "Avitus (9/10 July 455 - 17/18 October 456)", De Imperatoribus Romanis

Military offices
Preceded by Aetius; In 454	Magister militum of the Western Roman Army; 456	Succeeded by Messianus
