= Ricimer =

General and ruler of the Western Roman Empire (ca. 418–472)

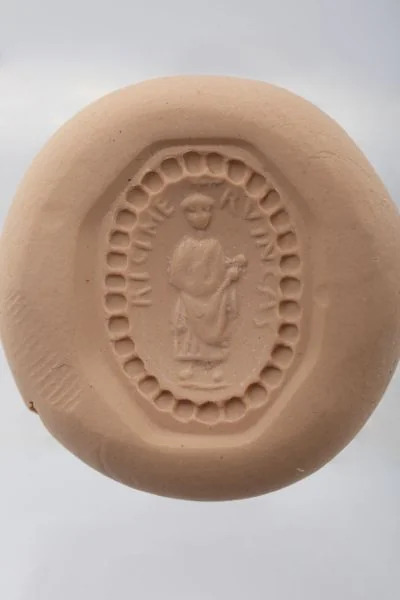
- Ricimer's seal with the inscription RICIMER VINCAS ("Ricimer, may you conquer") around it
- Born: c. 418
- Died: 19 August 472 (aged ca. 54)
- Military career
- Allegiance: Western Roman Empire
- Branch: Roman army
- Service years: ?–472
- Rank: Magister militum (de facto military dictator of the Western Roman Empire from 461)
- Conflicts: Battle of Agrigentum; Roman civil war of 456; Battle of Corsica; Roman civil war of 461; Gothic war against Aegidius; Vandal War (461–468); Battle of Bergamo; Siege of Rome

Ricimer (Note: Sometimes called Flavius Ricimer. The name "Flavius" became a courtesy title by the late 4th century.) (/ˈrɪsɪmər/ RISS-im-ər, Latin: [ˈrɪkɪmɛr]; c. 418 – 19 August 472) was a Romanized Germanic general, who ruled the remaining territory of the Western Roman Empire from 456 after defeating Avitus, until his death in 472, with a brief interlude in which he contested power with Procopius Anthemius. Deriving his power from his position as magister militum of the Western Empire, Ricimer exercised political control through a series of puppet emperors. Ricimer's death led to unrest across Italy and the establishment of a Germanic kingdom on the Italian Peninsula.

== Lineage ==
The date of Ricimer's birth is unknown. Some scholars have dated it as late as the early 430s, which would have made him unusually young when he rose to power. A birthdate of around 418 is more likely. The names of his parents are also unknown. In his panegyric to Anthemius, given in 468, the poet Sidonius Apollinaris claimed that Ricimer was Suevic on his father's side and Visigothic on his mother's, specifying that his maternal grandfather was Wallia, King of the Visigoths, who died in 418. It has been suggested that his Suevic father may have been a son of Hermeric, the king of the Suevi around 418, or else possibly Hermegarius, a Suevic war leader who died in 429.

It has been surmised that Ricimer was the offspring of a marriage alliance between the ruling Suevic and Gothic houses and although Ricimer's father was identified as a Sueve, his identity is more frequently attested as Gothic by ancient writers. Such an alliance has been suggested as occurring in the year 431, but a more likely date is anterior to Wallia's death in 418. Wallia's Visigothic successors were not his close relatives and may have been hostile toward the family members of the former king.

As entry into the Western Empire's military was a frequent option for "losers of struggles for leadership among the barbarians", Ricimer's family may have entered the service of Rome. Historian Peter Heather suggests that the lack of stability among the Visigoths themselves may have incentivized Ricimer's pursuit of an "entirely Roman career", despite being "the grandson of the Visigothic king Wallia".

Like many Germanic figures of note, Ricimer had relational ties to other tribes, like the Burgundians. For instance, Gundobad, Ricimer's "subordinate and successor", was his nephew since his sister had married the Burgundian king Gondioc. (Note: John of Antioch (fragment 209) is the source of this claim.)

== Rise to power ==
According to Sidonius Apollinaris, Ricimer served under the magister militum Aetius alongside the comes domesticorum Majorian, whom he befriended. (Note: See: Sidonius Apollinaris, Carmina, v, 266–268.) Historian Penny MacGeorge writes, "Majorian certainly, and Ricimer probably, had served under Aetius, and there may have been other elements to this connection, political, personal, and social, that would have brought them both close to the centers of political power."

Nonetheless, a power vacuum was created in the Western Empire after the events of 454 and 455, which saw the consecutive murders of Aetius and of the Western Emperor Valentinian III, who had been responsible for the magister militum's assassination. After the assassinations, the Roman Senator Petronius Maximus proclaimed himself emperor. Petronius's reign lasted less than three months, as shortly before the Vandal sacking of Rome in 455, he too was murdered. (Note: The Vandals had continuously raided the Italian coast since the assassination of Valentinian III in 455, wreaking havoc upon the Italian economy. The capital remained in disarray following Geiseric's sack of Rome and the Vandals' systematic destruction and wanton pillaging of goods.)

After Rome's sack, the Visigothic King Theodoric II proclaimed Avitus as Emperor, the Roman military commander in Gaul. In return for Theodoric II's support, Avitus agreed to allow the Visigoths to enter Suevi-controlled Hispania. After being proclaimed the new emperor in 456, Avitus mounted a campaign into Italy but was defeated in the Po Valley. In the interim, Avitus had named the Visigoth Remistus as magister militum.

Following the arrival of Avitus in Rome, Majorian gave his support, albeit reluctantly, to the new emperor. Avitus is subsequently thought to have appointed Ricimer as comes, a prominent military position, but this remains unclear and it is possible that Ricimer was comes before the elevation of Avitus. At this point, however, the Western Empire encompassed only the Italian Peninsula and portions of southern Gaul, a mere fraction of the territory held by imperial Rome in previous centuries. Ricimer, nonetheless, raised an army and navy from the Germanic mercenaries available to him and commenced campaigns directed against "barbarian" tribes in conflict with the empire. Ricimer achieved his first important victory in 456, when he defeated the Vandals in the Battle of Agrigentum and the Battle of Corsica. Although Priscus writes that Avitus had sent him to Sicily to engage the Vandals, Hydatius states Ricimer defeated the Vandals near Corsica. (Note: For the primary source references from antiquity, see the following: Hydatius, 176, s.a. 456; Priscus, fragment 24; Sidonius Apollinaris, Carmina, ii, 367.)

=== The revolt against Avitus ===
Vandal raids and civil disaffection—due in part to famine—proved problematic for Avitus. Not only was he never recognized as Emperor of the West by the eastern Emperor Marcian, Avitus found himself in an especially precarious position since disruptive events had hardly settled when Ricimer and Majorian rebelled against their former patron. The two led an army against Avitus's imperial forces commanded by the magister militum Remistus, whom they defeated; Remistus was executed at Ravenna in September 456 under "obscure circumstances". Avitus fled to Gaul to gather support from his Visigothic and Gallic followers but was defeated in the Battle of Placentia on 17 October 456. Avitus was captured, deposed, and forced to assume the bishopric of Piacenza, and finally executed—allegedly starved to death by Majorian and Ricimer.

== Magister militum ==
=== Majorian (457–461) ===
As magister militum Ricimer gained influence over the Germanic peoples occupying Gaul, Hispania, and Northern Africa. The sources suggest he and Majorian were operating in concert to seize power; the latter would become the future emperor, while Ricimer would command the military. Since Ricimer was a Germanic tribesman of Arian religious disposition, he was ineligible for the imperial throne himself. Whether or not he wished to be emperor is unknown, but in many respects, Ricimer can be viewed as an "heir of Stilicho", a barbarian general who served the Roman Empire faithfully.

With the throne of the Western Empire vacant, the Alamanni invaded Italy. They moved from Raetia and managed to reach Lake Maggiore on the south side of the Alps. Majorian led his field army north to fight the Alamanni, and defeated them. Reaching an agreement with Ricimer, Majorian was proclaimed emperor on 1 April 457. Realizing Majorian's potential as a puppet, Ricimer induced Emperor Leo to give his consent to this arrangement and on 28 December 457, Majorian's elevation to Emperor in the West was officially recognized by Constantinople. (Note: Originally, Leo had made Ricimer the western patricius, joining him with the patricii Aspar and Anthemius in the East.)

Leo may not have actually wanted to see Majorian on the throne, but he was in no position to object, since Majorian had a coalition that included the palatinate at Ravenna, Ricimer's Italian army, the Gallo-Roman general Aegidius, and Theodoric the Great. Leo also granted Ricimer the rank of magister militum. (Note: PLRE (II, p. 943) supports the idea that Ricimer had received the title of magister militum before Avitus's fall, probably as a consequence of his earlier victories against the Vandals.)

Majorian proved to be quite a capable ruler, to such a degree that historian Michael Grant claims he was "the last competent emperor the west ever produced". The new emperor demonstrated his military skill via campaigns in Gaul and Hispania against the Vandals and the Visigoths—atop instituting diplomatic and economic reforms—which greatly increased Majorian's standing among the senate and army, prompting Sidonius to produce a panegyric. Sometime in 458, Majorian staved off an Alamanni attack on Raetia and a Vandal assault on Campania. In 460, Majorian then prepared to lead a campaign by embarking from Spain against the Vandals of King Gaiseric. However, before the invasion was launched, the bulk of Majorian's fleet was sunk in the harbor at Cartagena, resulting in a blow to Roman prestige and to Majorian's reputation, which Ricimer exploited.

During his absence, Ricimer convinced the senate to turn against the emperor, who soon disbanded his army and returned to Italy. Learning that the emperor was in Tortona, Ricimer led a detachment there and arrested him. With the Western throne vacant, the new Eastern Emperor, Leo I, appointed Ricimer to replace Majorian in his Italian command. Without a Western Emperor, Leo hoped to use Ricimer as his effective vice-regent in the West. Deposing Majorian on 3 August 461, Ricimer had the emperor tortured and finally beheaded. (Note: Priscus gives the specific date of Majorian's death as 7 August 461; see: fragment 27, John of Antioch, fragment 203; both translated by C. D. Gordon, in Age of Attila, pp. 116f.)

=== Libius Severus (461–465) ===
Ricimer's murder of Majorian did not sit well with some portions of the military establishment, especially the commanding general in Gaul, Aegidius, and the commanding general in Dalmatia, Marcellinus, who ruled their respective domains independent from imperial authority. These two generals entered into open hostilities with Ricimer and refused to recognize Ricimer's position. Ricimer ruled the West without an emperor for three months. Facing pressure from the Senate and Italian aristocracy, Ricimer named the undistinguished Senator Libius Severus as Emperor on 19 November 461; Severus was recognized by the Senate in Rome, but the Eastern Emperor Leo I refused to acknowledge him as his Western counterpart. (Note: Also see: PLRE, II, p. 944.)

Although he faced open military opposition from Western generals, with the docile Severus as emperor, Ricimer was master of Rome and Italy. (Note: Testaments to Ricimer's status and influence appear as numismatic evidence in one case; minted coins for Emperor Severus contain Ricimer's personal monogram upon the reverse side. Another example shows on a bronze plaque—housed in a Berlin museum—containing the inscription: "salvis dd. nn. et patricio Ricimere", on one side and on the other, "Plotinus Eustathius v. c. urb. pr. fecit".) The principal problem facing Ricimer during Severus's reign was the lengthy war against the Vandals—who controlled Corsica, Sardinia, Malta, the Balearics, and Sicily, while also making incursions into mainland Greece and Italy—and political opposition from the Eastern Empire.

In 461, Ricimer suborned the Huns under Marcellinus, who was compelled to abandon Sicily. Then in 464, Ricimer commanded an army that met an invading Alan host at the Battle of Bergamo, where he defeated the invaders and killed their king, Beorgor. (Note: For the ancient texts, see: Fasti Vindobonenses Prior, s.a. 464; Cassiodorus, Chronica, s.a. 464; Marcellinus Comes, s.a. 464; Jordanes, Getica, 236; Paulus Diaconus, Historia Romana, xv.1.)

Due to diminished tax revenues and with the key armies of the West under opposition control, Ricimer needed assistance from the East to maintain order in the West. As such, Severus, despite his docile nature, represented an obstacle to Ricimer's power and a hindrance to any reconciliation efforts with Leo or Geiseric. On 14 November 465, Libius Severus died. According to Cassiodorus, he was poisoned by Ricimer, (Note: See: Cassiodrus, Chronicle, 1280, quoted in Oost) but this reconstruction is doubted on the basis of Sidonius Apollinaris. (Note: PLRE, II, p. 944; also see: Sidonius Apollinaris, Carmina, II, 317–318.) Ricimer proceeded to rule the West for eighteen months without an emperor as he waited for Leo to name Severus's successor. (Note: Ancient sources on this matter include: Theophanes the Confessor, Chronographia, AM 5947; Cedrenus, Synopsis historion, I.606.)

=== Anthemius (467–472) ===
For nearly two years, the throne in the West remained vacant, until 14 April 467, when Leo named the Greek aristocrat and son-in-law of Marcian, Anthemius, to the position. Leo's motivation included pressure from the Vandals, and perhaps the removal of a potential rival at Constantinople. Meanwhile, Ricimer married Anthemius's daughter Alypia, solidifying his connection to the emperor and providing the appearance of unity between the two halves of the Empire. The marriage was an extravagant affair with much pomp and show, and the union appears to have garnered support from the Roman population. On this occasion, Sidonius composed a lengthy panegyric to Anthemius and within it praises Ricimer; he claims that a goddess representing Italy speaks to the river god of the Tiber thus:

Furthermore, unconquerable Ricimer, to whom the destiny of the state looks anxiously, his own efforts alone hardly repulse the pirate who roves across the countryside, who avoids battle, who becomes the victor by flight. Who could endure such an enemy who refuses both peace and war? For he will never make a treaty with Ricimer. Harken to why he hates him so much. He is born of an uncertain father, while a slavewoman was certainly his mother. Now, [to show] that he is the son of a king, he proclaims his mother's adultery. Especially he envies Ricimer because two kingdoms call him to kingship; for he is Suevian through his father and Gothic through his mother. And at the same time he [Gaiseric] remembers that in the Tartesian lands [i.e. Spain] his grandfather Vallia, cast down the Vandal armies and their allies in war the Alans ... But why relate ancient flights and former defeats? He [Gaiseric] recalls his losses on the plain of Agrigentum. Ever since then he rages, because he knows that he [Ricimer] is the true grandson of the hero at whose sight the Vandals always turned in flight [Vallia]. Certainly you Marcellus were no more glorious when you returned from the lands of Sicily ... Noricum holds back the Ostrogoth because he [Ricimer] is feared; Gaul ties down the might of the Rhine because he inspires terror; because the Vandal hosts and their relatives the Alans plundered me [Italy] bare, he himself then took vengeance by his own arms. But, for all that, he is only one man; who can only accept so many risks alone. (Note: See: Sidonius, Pan. II, 352–382)

Leo sent Anthemius to Italy with an army led by the commanding general of the Dalmatian Army, Marcellinus, a former rival of Ricimer. Ricimer must have initially viewed Anthemius's appointment as undermining his position, for unlike Libius Severus, Anthemius had a proven history of military success and had family ties to the Theodosian Dynasty. However, needing the support of the Eastern Empire, Ricimer was forced to accept him as the price for Leo's good will and for "eastern protection against the depredations of Geiseric".

Soon after assuming the Western throne, Anthemius granted Marcellinus the rank of patrician in an effort to counterbalance the authority of Ricimer. Both Leo and Anthemius had seen the difficulty Western Emperors had in maintaining control over the Western military with the existence of a single unchallenged supreme commander. Despite these potential machinations, sources such as Ennodius attest to the power and influence of Ricimer, who once wrote that Ricimer was directing governmental affairs at this time and was "second only to the Emperor Anthemius". (Note: See: Ennodius, Vita Epiphanius, 51: "secundis ab Anthemio principe habenis rempublicam gubernabat".)

==== Campaign in North Africa ====
In 468, Leo organized a grand campaign against the Vandals in North Africa, to which the East and West would commit substantial forces. The commanding general of the Thracian army, Basiliscus, brother-in-law of Leo, assumed supreme command over the joint east–west assault, with Marcellinus commanding the Western forces. The plan called for a three-pronged attack led by Basiliscus, Marcellinus, and Heraclius of Edessa, the comes militaris (military count) of Egypt. Basiliscus was to land at a distance from Carthage with the main army (transported by an armada of over 1,000 ships) and then link up with Heraclius, advancing from Tripolitania. Marcellinus was to invade Africa from Sicily. Ricimer, under the overall command of Marcellinus, commanded a large portion of the Western forces in the expedition, but their fleet never sailed—due to Ricimer's veto—despite the West having agreed to contribute one-fourth of the total expedition's costs. (Note: Ricimer's behavior raised suspicions that he secretly wanted the expedition to fail, which it ultimately did following the disastrous Battle of Cape Bon.) Despite the other prongs of the attack making good progress at the onset, at least half of the joint armada was destroyed by Geiseric's fireships, causing Basilicus to abandon the attack against Carthage and withdraw back to Sicily. At this stage, Marcellinus was suddenly murdered while in Sicily, perhaps at the instigation of Ricimer.

==== Consequences of failure ====
The failed joint expedition against the Vandals was a "shock to Roman prestige". This combined military venture—known otherwise as the Battle of Cape Bon (468)—was an unequivocal disaster that reduced Roman military might and also nearly bankrupted the Western and Eastern Empires alike, certainly dooming the Western half "to extinction" according to historian Peter Heather. Upon hearing of the disastrous defeat, the Visigoths resumed their wars of expansion against the West and the Burgundians expanded their kingdom towards Arles. With Marcellinus dead, Geiseric recommenced his attacks upon Italy in 470, which forced Ricimer—as the sole commander in the West—to assume command of Italy's defense against the Vandals. Marcellinus had been Anthemius's favorite of the two generals, and his death served to widen the divide between the emperor and Ricimer. The tipping point of their relationship was the trial of Romanus, the imperial chancellor (magister officiorum) and supporter of Ricimer, whom Anthemius accused of treason and condemned to death in 470. (Note: For the classical sources, refer to: Cassiodorus, Chronicon, 1289; and Paul the Deacon, Historia Romana, xv.2; John of Antioch, fragments 209.1–2, 207, translated by C. D. Gordon, The Age of Attila (Ann Arbor: University of Michigan, 1966), pp. 122f) Following the execution of Romanus by Anthemius, Ricimer moved north to Milan with a force of six thousand soldiers. Relations between the two deteriorated to the point that Epiphanius of Pavia, bishop of Milan, was asked to negotiate peace between them. (Note: Related in: Ennodius, Vita Epiphanius, 51–75; translated in Sr. Genevieve Marie Cook, The Life of Saint Epiphanius by Ennodius: A translation with an introduction and commentary (Washington: Catholic University of America, 1942), pp. 53–63.)

Despite the bishop's efforts, the two were irreconcilable and began insulting one another; Anthemius called Ricimer a "skin-clad Goth", while Ricimer referred to the emperor as "an excitable Galatian". (Note: The exchanges between Anthemius and Ricimer are recorded in: Ennodius, Vita Epiphanius, 67, 53.) By 472, open warfare broke out between them, during which Ricimer marched on Rome itself, a siege that lasted many months. Four months into the assault on Rome, Ricimer named Olybrius (the brother-in-law of Geiseric) to the throne in a move of conciliation, since the Vandal king had been pressing for his elevation. (Note: According to John Malalas, Leo dispatched Olybrius from Constantinople to mediate a truce between Ricimer and Anthemius, but he had sent ahead a secret letter to Anthemius, urging him to kill Olybrius. Ricimer intercepted the letter, showed it to Olybrius, and had him proclaimed emperor. This contention is found in: John Malalas, Chronographica, 373–374. From what historian James M. Flynn relates, there is reason to be suspicious about this claim by Malalas, although he also avows, "It must be admitted, however, that Leo had some reason to fear and mistrust Olybrius, whose claim to the purple on dynastic grounds was, like that of Anthemius, stronger than the claim of Leo himself; Olybrius could furthermore count on the support of Gaiseric. Leo must have welcomed an opportunity to get Olybrius away from Constantinople, just as he had previously done with Anthemius.") After months of siege and suffering from starvation, Rome surrendered and Ricimer finally entered the city. (Note: See: John of Antioch, fragment 209.1–2; translated by C. D. Gordon, The Age of Attila, p. 122f) Anthemius tried to escape by disguising himself as a beggar, but the emperor was caught attempting to flee the city at the Church of Santa Maria in Trastevere, where he was beheaded on 11 July 472. (Note: John of Antioch, fragment 209, in C. D. Gordon, Age of Attila, p. 122f)

== Death and legacy ==
Ricimer's rule lasted until his death of natural causes—apparently a hemorrhage on 19 August 472—six weeks after deposing Anthemius. (Note: See: Cassiodorus, Chronica 472 AD: "post XL dies defunctus est. Olybrius autem VII imperii mense vitam peregit" ("40 days later he died. But Olybrius ended his life in the 7th month of his reign"). Between 11 July and 19 August there were exactly 40 days using inclusive counting; Paschale campanum 473: "moritur Ricimer XIIII kal. Septem." ("Ricimer died on the 14th day before the kalends of September", i.e. 19 August); Fasti vindobonenses priores 472: "defunctus est Ricimer XV kl. Septemb". ("Ricimer died on the 15th day before the kalends of September", i.e. 18 August; probably "XIV" (19 August) is intended).) His title of patrician and position as supreme commander were assumed by his nephew Gundobad. Nonetheless, Ricimer had been a figure of major significance and historians Stephen Williams and Gerard Friell put this into context with the following:

In his seventeen-year rule of Italy Ricimer worked through four emperors—Majorian, Severus, Anthemius, and Olybrius—in almost cavalier fashion. Each was simply cast aside when they no longer served his purpose. Indeed Majorian, the last competent military emperor who took his position seriously, was deposed precisely because of this. There were three periods in which no Western emperor reigned at all. All Ricimer's public actions suggest that he found the Western emperor an irrelevant encumbrance, and he would probably have preferred to rule Italy directly in the name of the emperor at Constantinople.

Historian Ilkka Syvänne's overall assement of Ricimer's career is highly critical:

[...] in the years following the death of Aetius, Ricimer's actions contributed more than anything else to the downfall of the West. Ricimer was a barbarian whose only goal in life was to promote his career at the expense of all else. It was thanks to Ricimer's devious plotting against Avitus, Majorian and Marcellinus that these excellent native commanders failed to stem the barbarian onslaught against the Roman Empire.

Further contextualization that led to a barbarian generalissimo like Ricimer having so much influence on the Western Roman Empire is captured by historian James M. O'Flynn, who writes:

Circumstances in the West demanded the existence of a supreme military commander who had a long record of intimate contact with barbarian troops; by the 470s, this virtually meant that he should be a barbarian. If a barbarian was unacceptable on the imperial throne (and, from the time of Constantius III, the throne was becoming less attractive to the few Romans who were eligible as generalissimos), then there had to be a generalissimo to function as a middle-man between the emperor—the impotent figurehead—and the barbarian troops, who represented real power. One is tempted, at first view, to wonder why the eastern emperors, in addition to fostering western colleagues, did not occasionally try to cultivate some well-disposed candidate for the post of generalissimo. Had Leo attempted this, perhaps the western throne might have been saved.

Without a powerful figure to guide it, the Western Roman Empire experienced an even more rapid succession of emperors, none of whom was able to effectively consolidate power. The line of Western Roman Emperors ended arguably in either 476 (with Odoacer's deposition of Romulus Augustus) or 480 (with Julius Nepos's death), concentrating the remaining imperial power in far-off Constantinople. Historian J. B. Bury claims that Odoacer was more or less a constitutional successor to Ricimer.

== Appearances in opera ==
Ricimer's life was used as a subject of opera libretti in the 17th and 18th centuries, embellishing his biography with romantic and political intrigues. The earliest setting was Matteo Noris's Ricimero re de' Vandali (set by Carlo Pallavicino, 1684), which focuses on the installation of Anthemius in Rome and the promise of marriage to his daughter Domizia. A better-known setting was Apostolo Zeno and Pietro Pariati's libretto Flavio Anicio Olibrio, set by Francesco Gasparini (1708), Nicola Porpora (1711), Leonardo Vinci (1728), and Niccolò Jommelli (1740). This libretto is based on Ricimer's siege of Rome and his relationship with Olybrius and their loves.

== Bibliography ==
- Bury, John B. (1923) [1889]. History of the Later Roman Empire. From the Death of Theodosius I to the Death of Justinian, A.D. 395 to A.D. 565. Vol. 1. London: Macmillan. OCLC 537268.
- Cameron, Alan (1988). "Flavius: A Nicety of Protocol". Latomus. 47 (1): 26–33. JSTOR 41540754.
- Cauthen, Paul (2001). "Ricimer". In Stanley Sadie; John Tyrrell (eds.). The New Grove Dictionary of Music and Musicians (2nd ed.). London: Macmillan. ISBN 978-1-56159-239-5.
- Christie, Neil (2011). The Fall of the Western Roman Empire: An Archaeological & Historical Perspective. New York: Bloomsbury Academic. ISBN 978-0-34075-966-0.
- Elton, Hugh (2018). The Roman Empire in Late Antiquity: A Political and Military History. Cambridge and New York: Cambridge University Press. ISBN 978-1-10845-631-9.
- Flomen, Max. The Original Godfather. Ricimer and the Fall of Rome. In: Hirundo 8, 2009, pp. 9ff.
- Frassetto, Michael (2003). Encyclopedia of Barbarian Europe: Society in Transformation. Santa Barbara, CA: ABC-CLIO. ISBN 978-1-57607-263-9.
- Gillett, Andrew (1995). "The Birth of Ricimer". Historia: Zeitschrift für alte Geschichte. 44 (3): 380–384. JSTOR 4436388.
- Goldsworthy, Adrian (2009). How Rome Fell: Death of a Superpower. New Haven and London: Yale University Press. ISBN 978-0-30013-719-4.
- Gordon, C.D. (1966). The Age of Attila: Fifth Century Byzantium and the Barbarians. Ann Arbor, MI: University of Michigan Press. OCLC 182501.
- Grant, Michael (1998). From Rome to Byzantium: The Fifth Century AD. London and New York: Routledge. ISBN 978-041514-753-8.
- Halsall, Guy (2007). Barbarian Migrations and the Roman West, 376–568. Cambridge and New York: Cambridge University Press. ISBN 978-0-52143-543-7.
- Heather, Peter (1996). The Goths. Oxford and Malden, MA: Blackwell. ISBN 978-0-63116-536-1.
- Heather, Peter (2005). The Fall of the Roman Empire: A New History of Rome and the Barbarians. Oxford and New York: Oxford University Press. ISBN 978-0-19515-954-7.
- James, Edward (2014). Europe's Barbarians, AD 200–600. London and New York: Routledge. ISBN 978-0-58277-296-0.
- Kulikowski, Michael (2019). The Tragedy of Empire: From Constantine to the Destruction of Roman Italy. Cambridge, MA: The Belknap Press of Harvard University Press. ISBN 978-0-67466-013-7.
- Lee, A.D. (2013). From Rome to Byzantium, AD 363 to 565: The Transformation of Ancient Rome. Edinburgh: Edinburgh University Press. ISBN 978-0-74862-790-5.
- MacGeorge, Penny (2002). Late Roman Warlords. Oxford and New York: Oxford University Press. ISBN 978-0-19-925244-2.
- Merrills, Andy; Miles, Richard (2010). The Vandals. Malden, MA: Wiley-Blackwell. ISBN 978-1-44431-807-4.
- Mitchell, Stephen (2007). A History of the Later Roman Empire, AD 284–641. Oxford and Malden, MA: Wiley Blackwell. ISBN 978-1-40510-856-0.
- O'Flynn, James M. (1983). Generalissimos of the Western Roman Empire. Alberta: University of Alberta Press. ISBN 978-0-88864-031-4.
- Oost, Stewart Irvin (1970). "D. N. Libivs Severvs P. F. AVG". Classical Philology. 65 (4): 228–240. doi:10.1086/365648. JSTOR 268600. S2CID 162306022.
- Randers-Pehrson, Justine D. (1993). Barbarians and Romans: The Birth Struggle of Europe, A.D. 400–700. Norman and London: University of Oklahoma Press. ISBN 978-0-80612-511-4.
- Seeck, Otto von (1920). Geschichte des Untergangs der antiken Welt (in German). Berlin: Siemenroth & Troschel.
- Sidonius (1936). Poems and Letters. Vol. 1. Translated by W. B. Anderson. Cambridge, MA: Harvard University Press. ISBN 978-0-67499-327-3.
- Syvänne, Ilkka (2020). Military History of Late Rome 425–457. Pen and Sword Military. ISBN 978-1-4738-7217-2.
- Williams, Stephen; Friell, Gerard (1999). The Rome That Did Not Fall: The Survival of the East in the Fifth Century. London and New York: Routledge. ISBN 0-415-15403-0.
- Wolfram, Herwig (1988). History of the Goths. Berkeley and Los Angeles: University of California Press. ISBN 0-520-05259-5.
- Wolfram, Herwig (1997). The Roman Empire and its Germanic Peoples. Berkeley and Los Angeles: University of California Press. ISBN 0-520-08511-6.

=== Further reading ===
- Anders, Friedrich (2010). Flavius Ricimer: Macht und Ohnmacht des weströmischen Heermeisters in der zweiten Hälfte des 5. Jahrhunderts. Frankfurt am Main.
- Scott, L. Robert. "Antibarbarian Sentiment and the "Barbarian" General in Roman Imperial Service: The Case of Ricimer". In: J. Harmatta (ed.): Proceedings of the 7th Congress of the International Federation of the Societies of Classical Studies Bd. 2, Budapest, 1984, pp. 23ff.

Political offices
Preceded by Julius Majorianus Augustus, Leo Augustus	Roman consul 459 with Patricius	Succeeded by Magnus, Apollonius
Military offices
Preceded by Messianus	Magister militum of the Western Roman army 456–472	Succeeded by Gundobad
