= Siege of Rome (472) =

472 siege

Date	March–July 472
Location	Rome, Italy
Result	Victory to Ricimer

Belligerents
Supporters of Ricimer; Burgundians	Western Roman Empire

Commanders and leaders
Ricimer; Odoacer	Anthemius (executed)

Strength
Unknown	Unknown

Casualties and losses
Unknown	Unknown

The siege of Rome was fought between supporters of the Western Roman general Ricimer and the Western Roman emperor Anthemius. Ricimer had previously established Anthemius as emperor, but later fell out with his nominee and attacked Rome. With the help of his Burgundian allies and the Germanic warrior Odoacer, Ricimer laid siege to Rome. After a five month siege and the defeat of a relief army from Gaul commanded by Bilimer, the city fell to Ricimer. Anthemius was captured and executed on 11 July, but Ricimer himself died of disease on 19 August. Four years later, Odoacer established himself as King of Italy.

== Sources ==
- Jaques, Tony (2007). Dictionary of Battles and Sieges: P-Z. Greenwood Publishing Group. ISBN 978-0313335396.
