= Battle of Agrigentum (456) =

- Part of the Roman-Germanic wars
Date	456
Location	Agrigentum, modern day Agrigento, Sicily
Result	Roman victory

Belligerents
Western Roman Empire	Vandal Kingdom

Commanders and leaders
Ricimer	Unknown

Strength
Unknown	Unknown

Casualties and losses
Unknown	Unknown

The Battle of Agrigentum was fought in 456 A.D. at Agrigentum, now Agrigento in modern-day Sicily. An army of the Western Roman Empire, led by the general Ricimer, drove off an invading force, a fleet of sixty ships, sent by the Vandal king Gaiseric to raid Sicily. Ricimer then led the Roman fleet against the Vandals and defeated them in a naval battle off the coast of Corsica. The victory gave the Romans only temporary relief from Vandal raids.

== Prelude ==
The Vandals led by their king Gaiseric (sometimes spelled Genseric) had earlier conquered North Africa after passing through Spain, frequently raided prosperous cities or areas of the European coast and sacked Rome in 455 AD. In spring or early summer of 456 AD, Ricimer led an army and navy of Romans, auxiliaries, and Germanic foederati to Sicily with the intention of repelling a known or suspected forthcoming Vandal attack.

== Battle ==
The Vandals initially forced the Romans onto the defensive in a partly forested battlefield. They were unable to break Ricimer's troops and after a hard-fought battle, the Romans drove off the Vandal force. The Vandals who survived the battle boarded their ships which sailed north toward Corsica. Ricimer followed the Vandals and defeated them in a naval battle off the coast of Corsica.

== Aftermath ==
Ricimer returned home to Italy where he and the generals Majorian and Aegidius, seized power from the Western Roman emperor, Avitus. They proclaimed Majorian, who was a full-blooded Roman, emperor.
