= Battle of Corsica =

Battle between the Western Roman Empire and the Vandals

Date	456
Location	Corsica, Italy
Result	Roman victory

Belligerents
Vandals	Western Roman Empire

Commanders and leaders
Unknown	Ricimer

Strength
60 ships	Unknown

Casualties and losses
Unknown	Unknown

The Battle of Corsica was fought between the Vandals and the Western Roman Empire in Corsica in 456. Prior to the battle, the Vandals had captured Carthage and made it the capital of their kingdom. In 456, a Vandal fleet of 60 ships sailed from Carthage, threatening both Gaul and Italy. The Vandals were defeated at Agrigentum by the comes militaris per Italia (commander of the military forces in Italy), the Suebian warrior, Ricimer, who was acting for Emperor Avitus, after which they sailed for Corsica. At Corsica the Vandals were again attacked by Ricimer and defeated. After having defeated the Vandals, Ricimer returned to Italy as a hero. However, he soon defected from Avitus and defeated him at Placentia.

== Sources ==
- Jaques, Tony (2007). Dictionary of Battles and Sieges: A-E. Greenwood Publishing Group. ISBN 978-0313335372.
