= Cazalla =

- Interactive map of Cazalla
- Country: Spain
- Province: Murcia
- Municipality: Lorca

Population
  - Total: 2,322

Cazalla is a village in Murcia, Spain. It is part of the municipality of Lorca.
