= Igreja de Santa Luzia (Lisbon) =

Church in Lisbon, Lisbon District, Portugal

Coordinates: 38°42′42″N 9°07′50″W

- View of the main façade of the church.

Religion
- Affiliation: Roman Catholic
- Diocese: Lisbon District
- Region: Lisboa Region
- Rite: Latin Rite

Location
- Location: Santa Luzia, Largo de Santa Luzia, 1100 Lisboa, Portugal.
- Municipality: Lisbon
- Interactive map of Igreja de Santa Luzia

Architecture
- Style: Baroque
- Groundbreaking: 12th century
- Completed: 18th century

Igreja de Santa Luzia is a church in Lisbon, Portugal. It is located near a lookout terrace, called a miradouro. It is classified as a National Monument.

== Gallery ==
Azulejo panel of Terreiro do Paço

Azulejo panel of the conquest of Lisbon

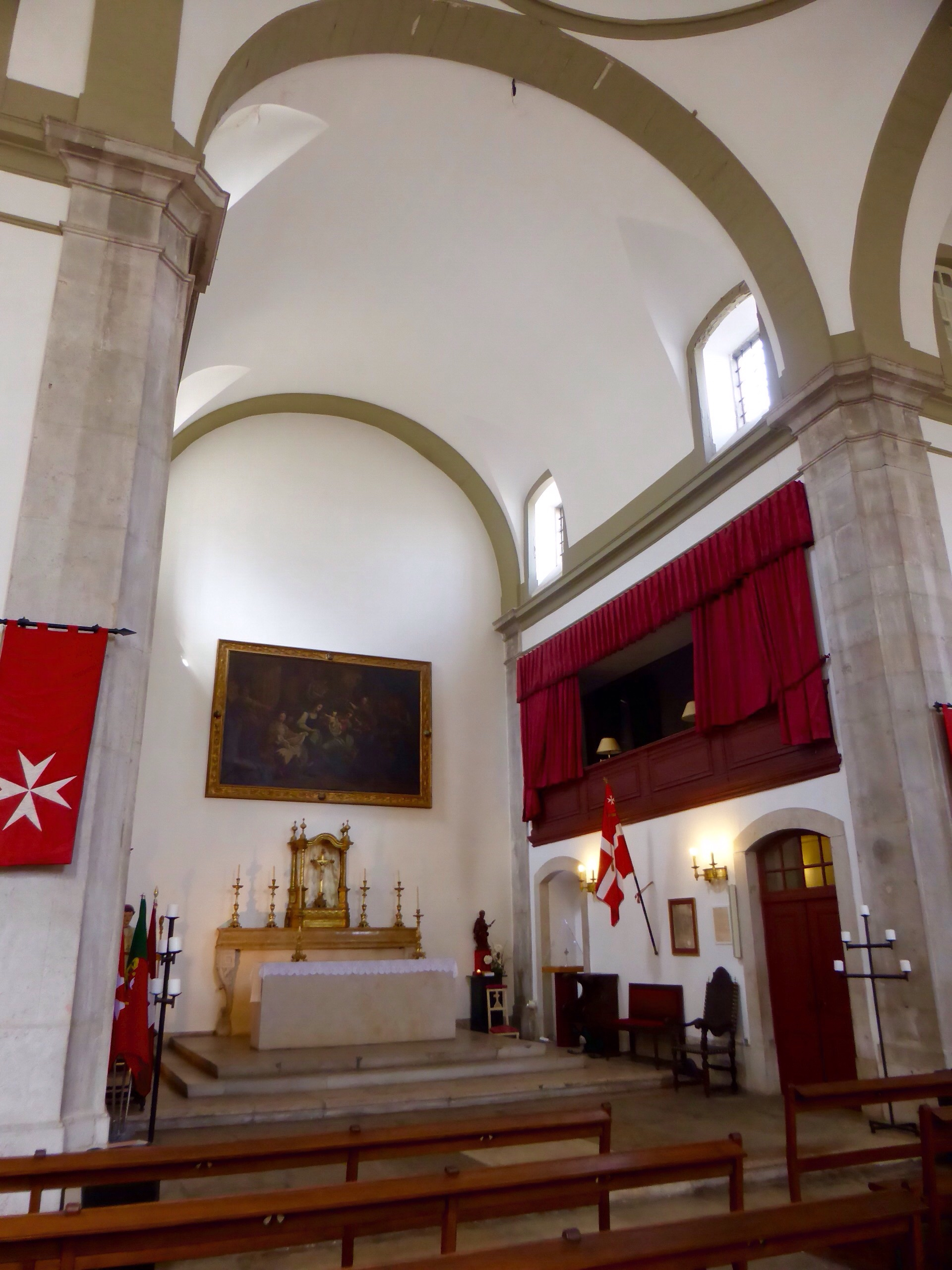
Interior of the church

== See also ==
- Catholicism in Portugal
