= Messianus =

Fifth-century Roman patricius under Emperor Avitus

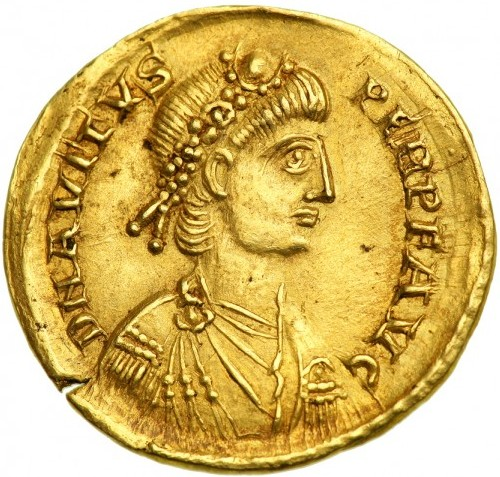
Gold solidus of Emperor Avitus (455–456), struck at Arelate/Arles. Messianus served as Avitus’ senior officer in the autumn of 456.

Messianus (also Missianus) was a late Roman military officer active in 456 during the reign of the Western emperor Avitus. He is attested in the Chronicle of Hydatius and in the Fasti Vindobonenses priores, which record him as patricius and state that he was killed during Avitus's final defeat near Piacenza in October 456.

== Life ==
Little else is known of Messianus beyond his brief role in Avitus's last campaign. Following the death of the magister militum Remistus earlier in 456, Avitus conferred on Messianus the rank of patricius, a title that in the mid-fifth century generally implied senior military authority. The brief tenure of Messianus is noted in the sequence of senior military officials during Avitus's last months, between the death of Remistus and the rise of Ricimer.

In October 456, Avitus attempted to retain the throne against the coalition formed by Majorian and Ricimer, who had secured the Senate’s backing and the allegiance of the Italian field army. The opposing forces clashed near Piacenza on 17–18 October. Hydatius reports that Messianus was killed in the fighting, and his death is likewise noted in the Consularia Italica. Avitus was compelled shortly thereafter to assume the bishopric of Piacenza.

The death of Messianus comprised a rapid turnover in the senior military hierarchy during 456, after which Ricimer emerged as the Western Empire’s dominant military figure.

== Bibliography ==
- Burgess, R. W. (1993). Hydatius: The Chronicle. Translated Texts for Historians. Vol. 23. Oxford: Clarendon Press. OCLC 1358394428.
- James, Edward (2014). Europe's Barbarians, AD 200–600. London and New York: Routledge. ISBN 978-0-58277-296-0.
- Jones, A. H. M.; Martindale, J. R.; Morris, J., eds. (1980). The Prosopography of the Later Roman Empire, Vol. II: A.D. 395–527. Cambridge: Cambridge University Press. ISBN 0521201594.
- Mathisen, Ralph W. (1998). "Avitus (455–456 A.D.)". De Imperatoribus Romanis (An Online Encyclopedia of Roman Emperors). University of South Carolina.
- Mommsen, Theodor (1892). Chronica Minora, Vol. I. Monumenta Germaniae Historica: Auctores antiquissimi. Vol. IX. Berlin: Weidmann. OCLC 832737747.
- O'Flynn, John Michael (1983). Generalissimos of the Western Roman Empire. Edmonton: University of Alberta Press. ISBN 0-88864-031-5.
