= Melanistic mask =

Dog coat pattern

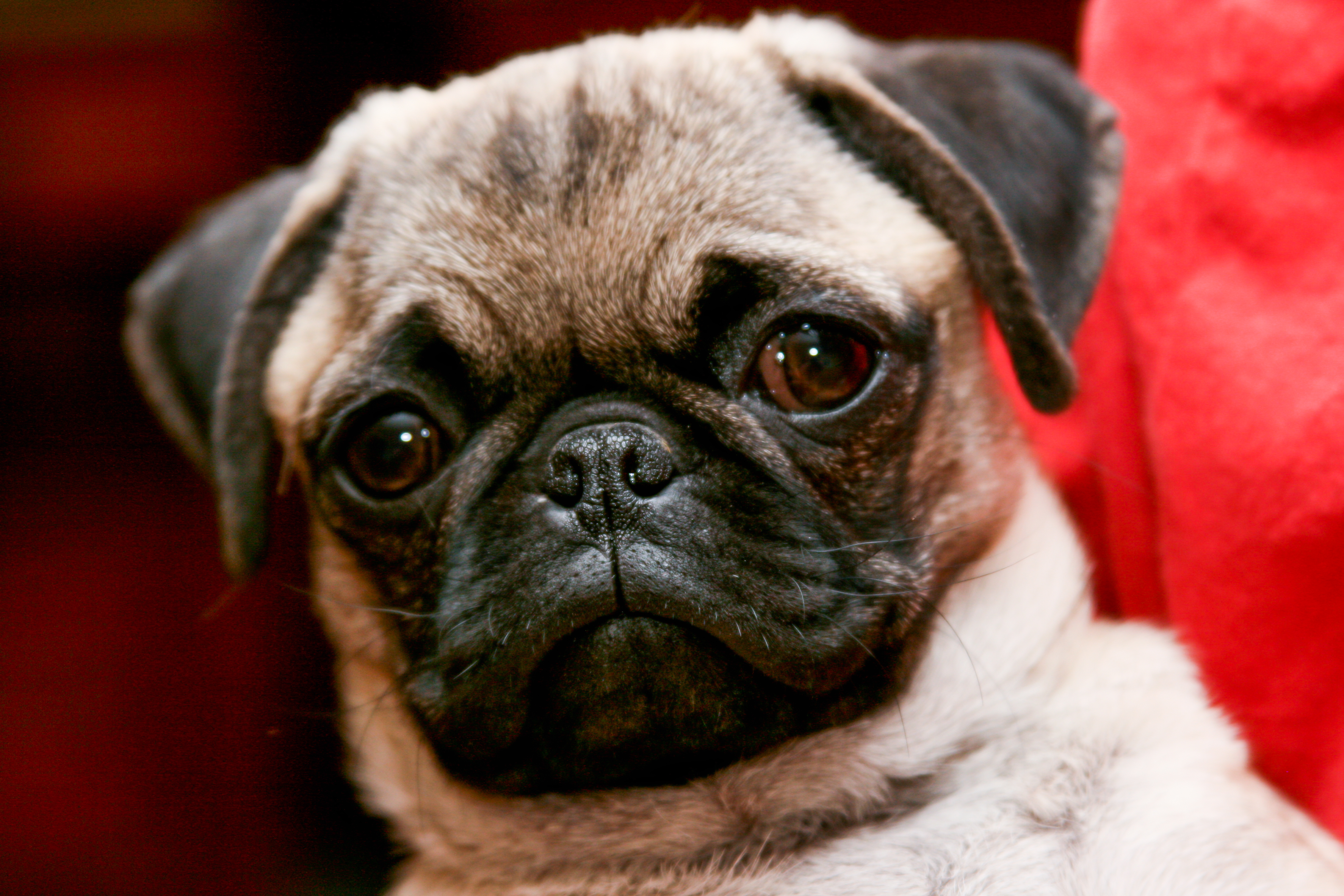
Pug with black melanistic mask

A melanistic mask (also referred to as a mask or masking) is a dog coat pattern that gives the appearance of a mask on the dog's face. The hairs on the muzzle, and sometimes entire face and/or ears, are colored by eumelanin instead of pheomelanin pigment. Eumelanin is typically black, but may instead be brown, dark gray, or light gray-brown. Pheomelanin ranges in color from pale cream to mahogany. The trait is caused by M264V (E^{M}), a completely dominant allele (form) of the melanocortin 1 receptor gene.

== Appearance ==
At minimum, a melanistic mask will appear on the muzzle, and may also be visible on the eartips, entire ears, or entire face. Hairs in those areas will be colored by eumelanin instead of pheomelanin pigment, making it look as though the dog has a mask on its face. Eumelanin is usually black, but may instead be liver (also known as chocolate; dark brown), blue (also known as slate; dark grey), or isabella (also known as lilac; light grey-brown); accordingly, a mask may be any of these colors. Pheomelanin occurs in shades of red ranging from ivory to mahogany, which include cream, gold, and tan.

A mask is visible in conjunction with a variety of coat patterns, such as tan points and sable. Nonetheless, it may be difficult to see with certain others, such as brindle, and will not be visible on a completely eumelanic coat. Any white markings on the coat, caused by a lack of pigment, will appear to be layered over the mask and other markings.

== Genetic basis ==
The melanistic mask is caused by the M264V allele (known as E^{M}) at the melanocortin 1 receptor (MC1R) locus, also known as the extension locus. It is completely dominant to the other alleles of the gene, and causes the melanocyte-stimulating hormone to bind to and activate melanocortin 1 receptors (located on melanocytes) in the mask's area, causing those melanocytes to produce eumelanin. Another allele, known as E, is responsible for "normal extension", which allows eumelanin to be produced as usual. e, completely recessive to the other alleles, suppresses all eumelanin production in the coat—the resulting color is sometimes known as recessive red, clear red or Australian red. Therefore, if a dog appears clear red or fawn but has a mask, the agouti gene is responsible for all pheomelanic hairs. Although Clarence Cook Little proposed in 1957 that brindle was caused by another allele at the same locus, known as e^{br}, his hypothesis was refuted in a 2007 study.

== Gallery ==
File:Deutscher_Schäferhund-_portrait.JPGGerman Shepherd dog with black mask

File:Whippet_długowłosy_głowa_suki_MB_01.jpgLonghaired whippet with black mask

File:French_Mastiff_001.jpgRed dogue de Bordeaux with liver mask

File:AlpineMastiff0077.JPGSt. Bernard with black mask and white markings

File:Kerry_blue_terrier_pl2.jpgKerry Blue Terrier with black mask. Although the coat on the body has lightened in color in a process known as "clearing" or "greying", the mask has retained its original color.

File:Vilda1.jpgBorder Collie puppy with black mask, tan points, and white markings. On the front portion of the muzzle, the points on the cheeks are partially "covered up", or inhibited in expression, by the mask.
