= Julius Nepos =

Western Roman emperor from 474 to 480

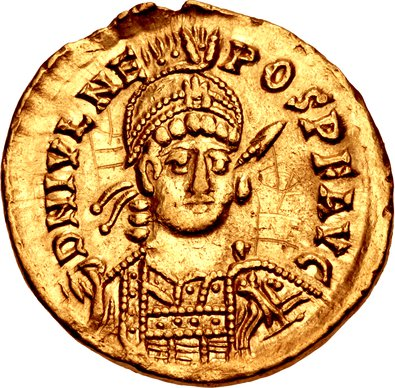
- Solidus of Julius Nepos, marked: d n ivl nepos p f avg

Roman emperor
- In Italy: 24 June 474 – 28 August 475
- Predecessor: Glycerius
- Successor: Romulus Augustulus
- In Dalmatia: 28 August 475 – 9 May 480 (Note: Even though Romulus Augustulus is widely considered to be the last Roman emperor in the West, Nepos still claimed the title in Dalmatia.)
- Successor: position abolished (Zeno in the East) (Note: Upon Nepos's death, Odoacer, the King of Italy, recognized the eastern emperor Zeno as his suzerain. It has been suggested that some western coins minted in Zeno's name were minted in Dalmatia in the immediate aftermath of Nepos's death, which would mean that Zeno's rule was swiftly accepted.) (Ovida as ruler in Dalmatia)
- Born: Dalmatia
- Died: 9 May 480 (Note: 9 May 480 is the most commonly cited date by modern historians. Its accuracy is not certain, as contemporary sources give three different dates: 25 April, 22 June and 9 May.); Near Salona
- Spouse: Relation of Verina (possibly niece-in-law of Leo I)
- Dynasty: Leonid
- Father: Nepotianus
- Mother: Sister of Marcellinus
- Religion: Chalcedonian Christianity

Julius Nepos (died 9 May 480), or simply Nepos, (Note: /ˈniːpɒs/) ruled as Roman emperor of the West from 24 June 474 to 28 August 475. After losing power in Italy, Nepos retreated to his home province of Dalmatia, from which he continued to claim the western imperial title, with recognition from the Eastern Roman Empire, until he was murdered in 480. Though Nepos's successor in Italy, Romulus Augustulus (r. 475–476), is traditionally deemed the last western Roman emperor, Nepos is regarded by some current historians as the true last emperor of the west, being the last widely recognised holder of the position.

A native of Dalmatia, Nepos began his career as the semi-autonomous governor of the province, succeeding his uncle Marcellinus, a prominent general, as magister militum ('master of troops') of Dalmatia. After the death of the western emperor Anthemius (r. 467–472), who had been appointed by the eastern emperor Leo I (r. 457–474), as well as Anthemius's successor Olybrius (r. 472), Leo sought to assert his authority in the west, granting Nepos command of an army in December 473 to attack Italy and depose Glycerius (r. 473–474), who had been proclaimed emperor by the Burgundian general Gundobad. Nepos left for Italy in the spring of 474, backed by Leo's successor Zeno, and landed with his army at Portus, near Rome. Nepos swiftly deposed Glycerius and was crowned western emperor in Rome on 24 June 474. (Note: The Fasti vindobonenses gives VIII kal. Iulias (24 June), while the Auctarium Prosperi Havniense gives XIII kal. Iulias (19 June), one of which is a corruption of the other. The Fasti dates are usually the most accepted.) He was the last emperor to be crowned in the city until Charlemagne in the ninth century. (Note: Nepos's successor, Romulus Augustulus, was crowned in Ravenna.) Whether the original intention of the invasion was to install Nepos as western emperor is unclear, but in any event, he was quickly recognised as the legitimate western emperor by Zeno.

Nepos worked to restore the prestige and authority of the Western Empire, though mostly unsuccessfully. He may have repelled a Visigothic attack on Italy and managed to once more reduce the Burgundians into foederati. Nepos focused most of his attention on reasserting imperial control and authority in Gaul, but the Western Empire could no longer project enough strength to halt Visigothic conquests in the region. The failure to defeat the Visigoths in Gaul, and Zeno's brief overthrow in Constantinople by the usurper Basiliscus, weakened Nepos's already shaky position in Italy. In 475, Nepos's newly appointed magister militum Orestes revolted and marched on Ravenna, capital of the Western Empire. Unable to deal with Orestes's forces, Nepos fled back to Dalmatia and two months later, Orestes proclaimed his young son Romulus Augustulus as emperor.

Although no longer in control of Italy, Nepos never renounced his claim to the Western Empire and continued to be recognised as the legitimate western emperor by the Eastern Empire. In 476, the barbarian general Odoacer deposed Romulus Augustulus and became the first king of Italy. Nepos repeatedly petitioned Zeno, who by then had defeated Basiliscus, for help in regaining control of Italy, though all he achieved was nominal recognition by Odoacer, who minted coins in Nepos's name but otherwise mostly ignored him. In 480, Nepos was murdered by two of his generals, Ovida and Viator, perhaps in Diocletian's Palace, possibly while planning an expedition of his own to recover Italy.

== Background ==
=== Geopolitical background ===
The Eastern (orange) and Western (green) Roman Empires in 476

The idea that the Roman Empire had grown too large to efficiently be managed by one emperor, and was more appropriately governed by two co-ruling emperors, had become established by the time of emperor Diocletian (r. 284–305) in the late 3rd century. Throughout the 4th century, various different divisions were made until the empire was firmly and permanently divided into western and eastern spheres of imperial administration from the death of emperor Theodosius I (r. 379–395) in 395. Though modern historians typically use the terms Western Roman Empire and Eastern Roman Empire to describe the new political situation, the Romans themselves never considered the empire to have been formally divided, still viewing it as a single unit, although most often having two rulers rather than one. The Western Roman Empire was more rural than the east, with fewer people and a less stable economy. Throughout the 5th century, it experienced an increasing number of Germanic barbarian invasions and settlements and a period of decline. In 410, the Visigoths under Alaric I had sacked Rome; in 455, the last western emperor of the Theodosian dynasty, Valentinian III (r. 425–455), was deposed and murdered. That same year, Rome was sacked again, this time by the Vandals under Gaiseric, who captured Valentinian's widow, Licinia Eudoxia, and two of his daughters, Eudocia and Placidia. The Western Roman army gradually became increasingly reliant on barbarian mercenaries. After Valentinian's murder, the most powerful barbarian generals, such as Ricimer, became politically dominant, ruling through proclaiming puppet emperors. In the time between the death of Valentinian and the accession of Julius Nepos, a period of less than twenty years, seven different emperors ruled the west and effective imperial control was only exercised in Italy, Raetia and some regions of Gaul.

=== Ancestry and family ===
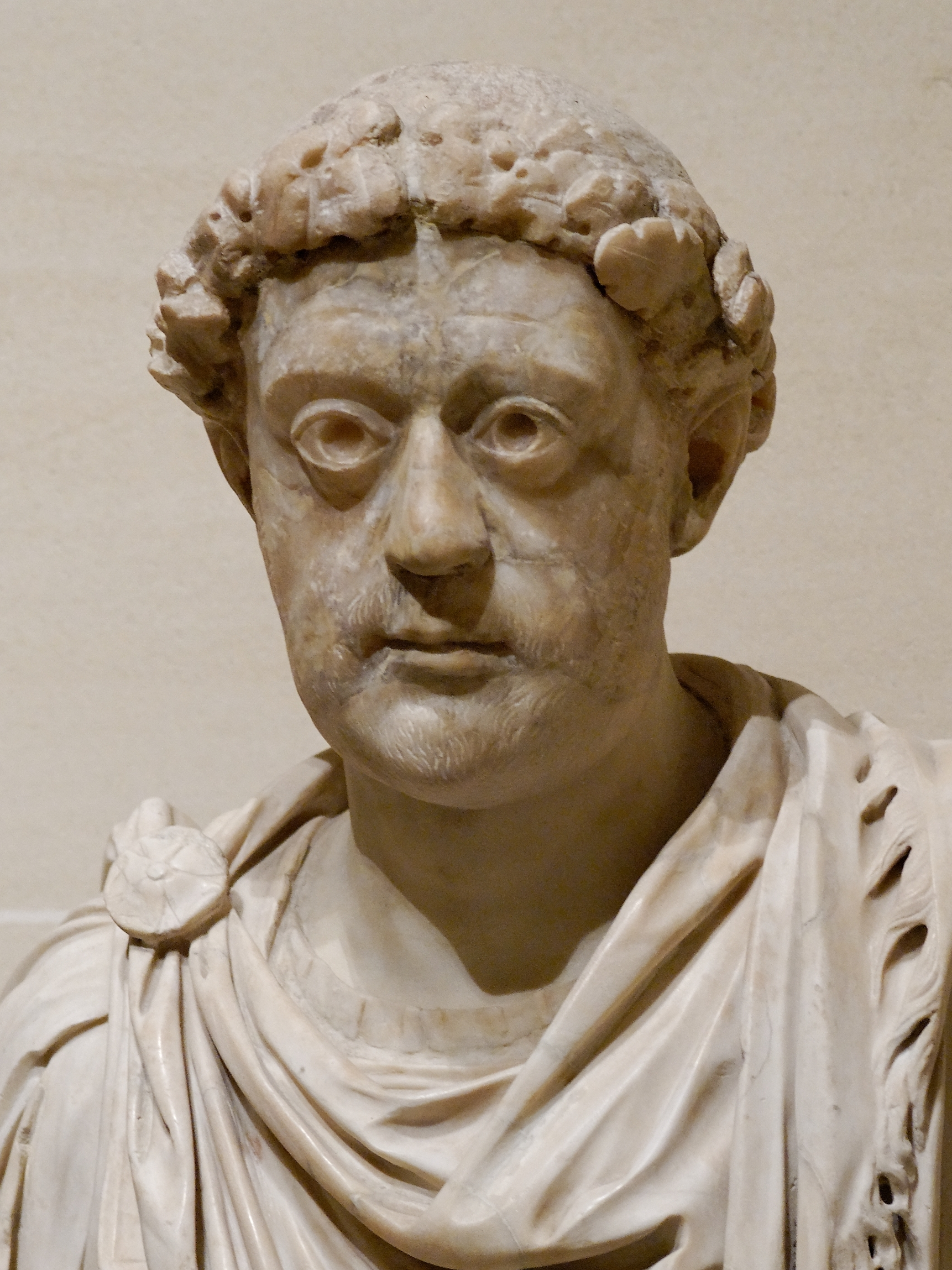
Bust of the eastern emperor Leo I (r. 457–474), who assigned Nepos the army he took Italy with and who was possibly the uncle of Nepos's wife

Julius Nepos was a native of the Roman province of Dalmatia. Dalmatia, although politically, economically and geographically oriented towards the Western Roman Empire, had formally been under the authority of the Eastern Roman Empire since 437, when the western emperor Valentinian III had ceded it to the east. In practical terms, the province was often more or less autonomous. Nepos was the son of Nepotianus (died 465), a general who served under the western emperor Majorian (r. 457–461). The nephew of the magister militum ('master of troops', a high-ranking military officer) Marcellinus (died 468), being the son of one of Marcellinus's sisters. Nepos may have been part of a prominent local Roman family in Dalmatia. This is supported by memorial inscriptions from four roughly contemporary individuals; Aelia Nepotes, Aelia Nepos, another Julius Nepos and Nepotes, having been identified from Dalmatia.

Nepos's uncle Marcellinus was a prominent late Roman general, having fought the Vandals in several campaigns and playing a notable role in momentarily fending off Vandal attempts at controlling Sardinia. In 461, after the murder of Emperor Majorian by Ricimer, Marcellinus appears to have planned to invade Italy to depose Ricimer's puppet emperor Libius Severus (r. 461–465), but he was dissuaded from this course of action by the eastern emperor Leo I. Nepos married a Roman noblewoman whose name is not recorded, but who was related to the eastern empress Verina, possibly a niece of Leo I.

By the time of his death, Marcellinus had been a semi-autonomous governor in Dalmatia, and after his death, Nepos inherited this position. Nepos is first attested on 1 June 473, when he is described as magister militum Dalmatiae, although it is possible that he had held that rank ever since Marcellinus's death. Nepos might have held this position until he became emperor in 474, by which point he had also become a patrician.

=== Appointment ===
After the death of the western emperor Anthemius (r. 467–472) as well as his successor Olybrius (r. 472), who had not been recognised in the east, Leo I, the sole remaining Roman emperor, maintained that he had the right to select the new western emperor. At first, Leo did not act on this right, perhaps because he had no suitable candidates to promote or because of the violent end of Anthemius, who had been previously appointed by Leo I. In March 473, the Burgundian king Gundobad, nephew of Ricimer, appointed the comes domesticorum (commander of the palace guard) Glycerius as western emperor. Angered by this, Leo appointed Nepos as the commander of an army to attack Italy and depose Glycerius. Why Leo waited so long to appoint Nepos is not known, but by this time the winter meant that Nepos could not take action against Glycerius for a few months. By appointing Nepos to lead the invasion, Leo not only sought to assert his authority in the west but perhaps also hoped to rid himself of a possible rival in the east. After the political situation in Constantinople had stabilised sufficiently in the aftermath of Leo I's death on 18 January 474, Nepos left for Italy in the spring of 474, with the backing of the new eastern emperor Zeno.

== Reign ==
=== Emperor in Italy (474–475) ===
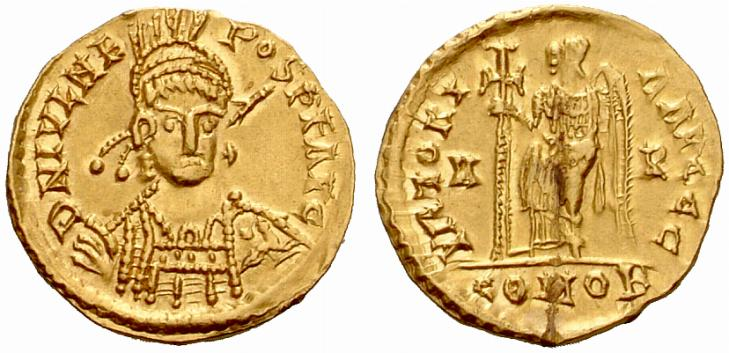
Solidus of Nepos minted at Arles in southern Gaul

Nepos and his force sailed from Constantinople and landed at Portus, near Rome, where he was promptly proclaimed Caesar, (Note: The chronicle of Marcellinus Comes and the Anonymus Valesianus specify Nepos landing at Portus. The later work by Jordanes contradictingly states that Nepos landed at Ravenna, and was proclaimed Caesar there on the orders of Zeno. Following Jordanes, some modern historians hold that Nepos was made Caesar at Ravenna rather than Portus. In any event, he was made Caesar before he was made Augustus.) per the procedure preceding elevation to the rank of Augustus (emperor). On 24 June, having deposed Glycerius, Nepos was proclaimed the western Augustus in Rome. Nepos thus accomplished the exact intervention into Italy that had been planned by his uncle Marcellinus some years prior. Nepos was the last emperor to be crowned in Rome until the coronation of Charlemagne in 800. Glycerius put up no resistance against Nepos, and his life was spared; he was consecrated as bishop of Salona, the provincial capital of Dalmatia. It is not clear if Nepos becoming emperor had been Zeno's plan, but in any event, Zeno swiftly recognised him as the legitimate western emperor. His rule was likewise accepted by the Roman Senate and the people of Italy.

Few records of Nepos's reign survive, and little is known of his activities. He is known to have issued coins throughout Italy, such as at Rome, Ravenna and Mediolanum. Coinage minted in northern Gaul in his name indicates that his rule was accepted by the Roman general Syagrius, who ruled a more-or-less autonomous province of his own there. Nepos also issued symbolic coins of Zeno and his junior colleague Leo II, indicating his close ties and gratitude to the eastern court.

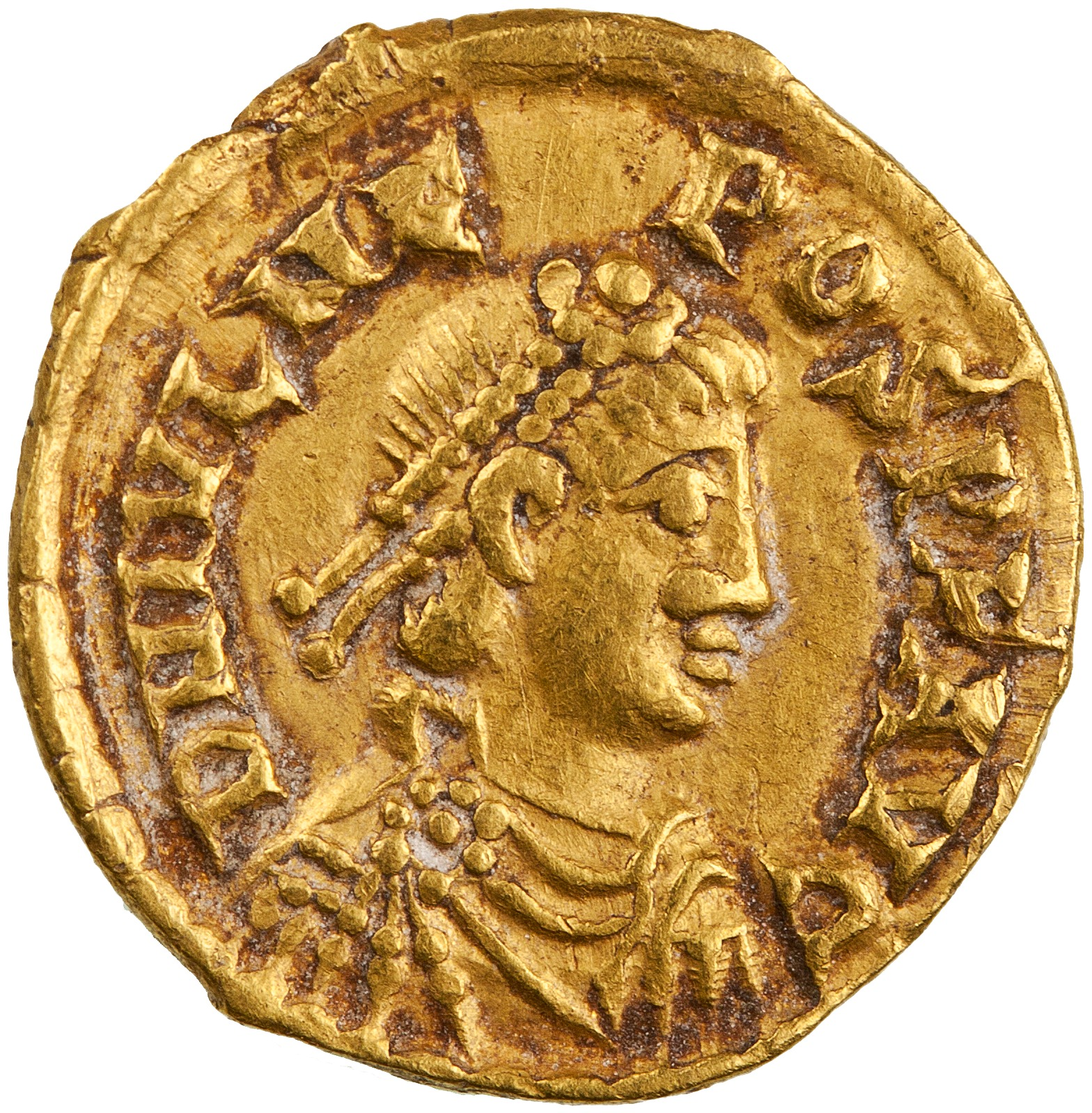
Tremissis of Nepos minted in Rome.

Nepos worked to restore imperial prestige. Through his initial efforts, a Visigothic attack on Italy appears to have been repelled and the Burgundians were once again made into foederati (barbarian allies of the empire). It appears that Nepos mainly directed his efforts to attempting to restore and consolidate imperial authority in Gaul, for this result he gave up Hispania. The remaining imperial territories in Gaul were at the time being invaded by Euric, king of the Visigoths, who also fought against the Roman forces in Spain and who hoped to take control of the province of Aquitania Prima. To combat the threat, Nepos appointed Ecdicius, a son of the former western emperor Avitus (r. 455–456) as patrician and magister militum. Per the surviving writings of contemporary Gallo-Roman authors, such as Sidonius Apollinaris, Nepos's accession was enthusiastically accepted in the remaining imperial possessions in Gaul. Ecdicius successfully managed to relieve a Visigothic siege of Arles in 474. Still, he was less successful in 475 as there simply were not enough remaining military resources to achieve victory. Even after Ecdicius had proven unable to defeat the Visigoths, the threat of imperial invasion made Euric willing to negotiate with Nepos. In the spring of 475, Nepos sent as his ambassadors to Euric a group of Roman bishops, which included Epiphanius of Pavia, who had previously brokered peace between Ricimer and emperor Anthemius. Although Epiphanius and his delegation apparently achieved peace, a second delegation, consisting of the bishops Leontius of Arles, Faustus of Riez, Graecus of Marseilles, and Basilius of Aix, was sent later in 475, possibly tasked with working out the concrete terms of the peace treaty. The Romans in Gaul, including Sidonius Apollinaris, were shocked to learn that the peace had involved ceding the Auvergne region to the Visigoths in turn for them leaving the rest of what remained under imperial control in Gaul alone. Nepos's failure to actually defeat the Visigoths, combined with Zeno's overthrow in Constantinople in early 475 by the usurper Basiliscus, weakened Nepos's position, which had been shaky in Italy from the very beginning.

In his foreign policy, Nepos also had to deal with the Vandals, who ruled North Africa, and their renewed and increased pirate attacks throughout the Mediterranean. Because of the weak position of the western empire, Nepos was forced to recognise Vandal rule over the territories they had already taken in Africa and throughout the Mediterranean, such as the islands of Sardinia and Corsica, the Balearics, and parts of Sicily.

After the failure of Nepos's efforts in Gaul, he dismissed Ecdicius and replaced him as magister militum with Orestes, a distinguished officer who had once served as notarius (secretary) to the Hunnic king Attila. Nepos tasked Orestes with leading another army against the Visigoths, and against the Burgundians, who were rebelling, in southern Gaul. Orestes's army included many foederati troops, whom he learned were upset with the emperor for refusing their requests to be granted land. With the backing of this army, Orestes disobeyed Nepos's orders and instead marched on Ravenna, the capital of the western empire. Hoping to maintain control, Nepos recalled Ecdicius from Gaul, but he was unable to arrive in time. On 28 August 475, Orestes entered Ravenna with his army, and Nepos escaped across the Adriatic Sea to Salona in Dalmatia, having ruled in Italy for only 14 months. On 31 October, Orestes proclaimed his young son, Romulus Augustulus, as emperor.

=== Exile in Dalmatia (475–480) ===
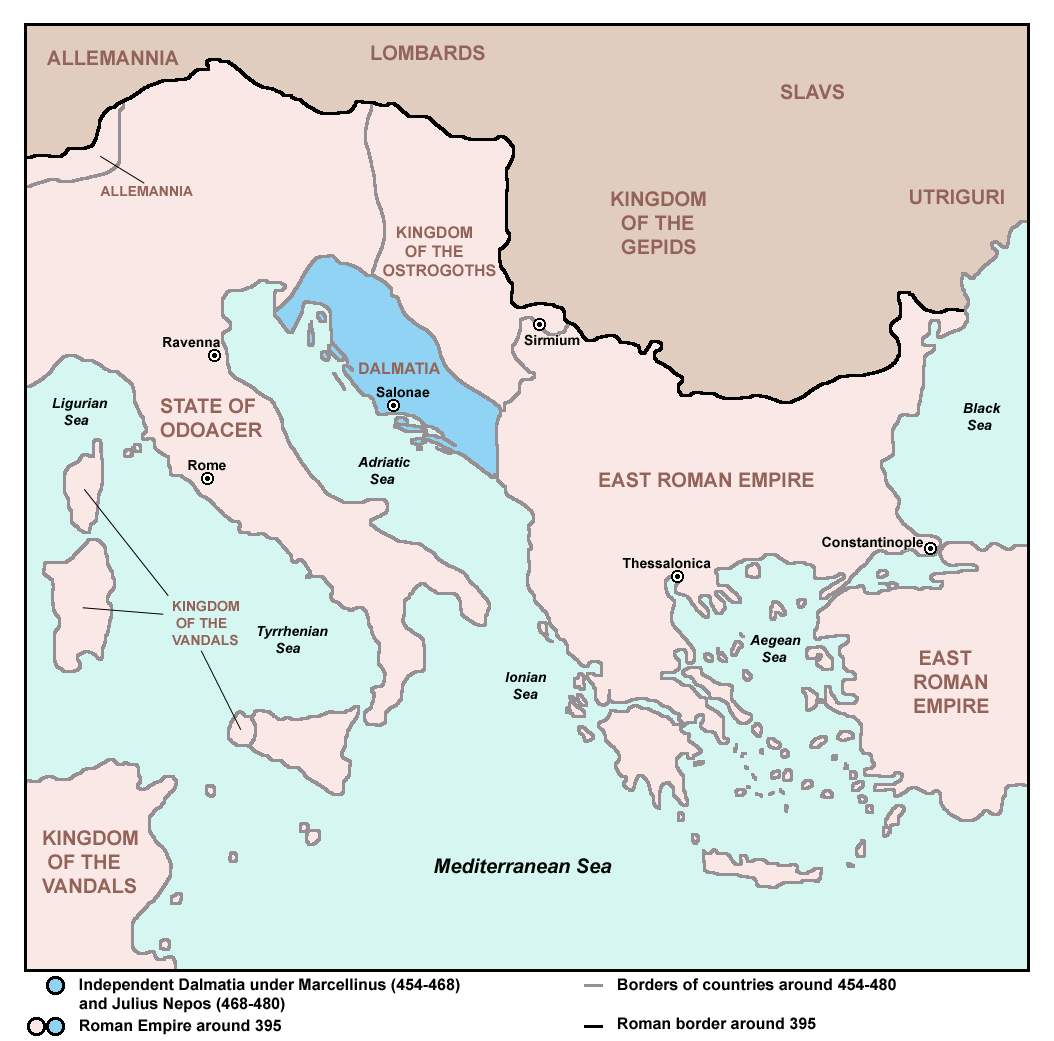
Approximate extent of Nepos's domain in Dalmatia in 476, with neighbouring states

Little is known of Nepos's later activities in Dalmatia due to the scarcity of surviving sources. Nepos never renounced his claim to the Western Empire and continued to be recognised in the east instead of Romulus Augustulus. Throughout his time in exile, Nepos hoped to regain control of Italy. On 4 September 476, Romulus Augustulus was deposed by the barbarian general Odoacer, who became the first king of Italy. Odoacer sent Romulus's western imperial regalia to Zeno in the east, and swore allegiance to him, ruling without further imperial successors in the west. Odoacer considered the Roman Empire from this point on as only requiring a single emperor, ruling from Constantinople. At the same time, an embassy from Nepos arrived in Constantinople, congratulating Zeno on regaining Constantinople from Basiliscus and requesting his assistance in restoring Nepos to power in Italy. Zeno responded to the ambassadors sent by Odoacer, members of the Roman Senate, that they had killed one east-supported emperor (Anthemius) and driven one out (Nepos) and that they would do well in receiving Nepos back as their ruler. Zeno also stated that Odoacer would do best in receiving the rank of patrician, which he had requested, not from Zeno, but from the legal western ruler, Nepos, although Zeno promised to grant the rank if Nepos would not. Zeno also urged Odoacer to accept Nepos back as emperor in Italy. Although Zeno and Verina, who remained influential at court, officially supported Nepos's restoration and continued to regard him as the western emperor, he was not granted the necessary military support or funding to retake Italy.

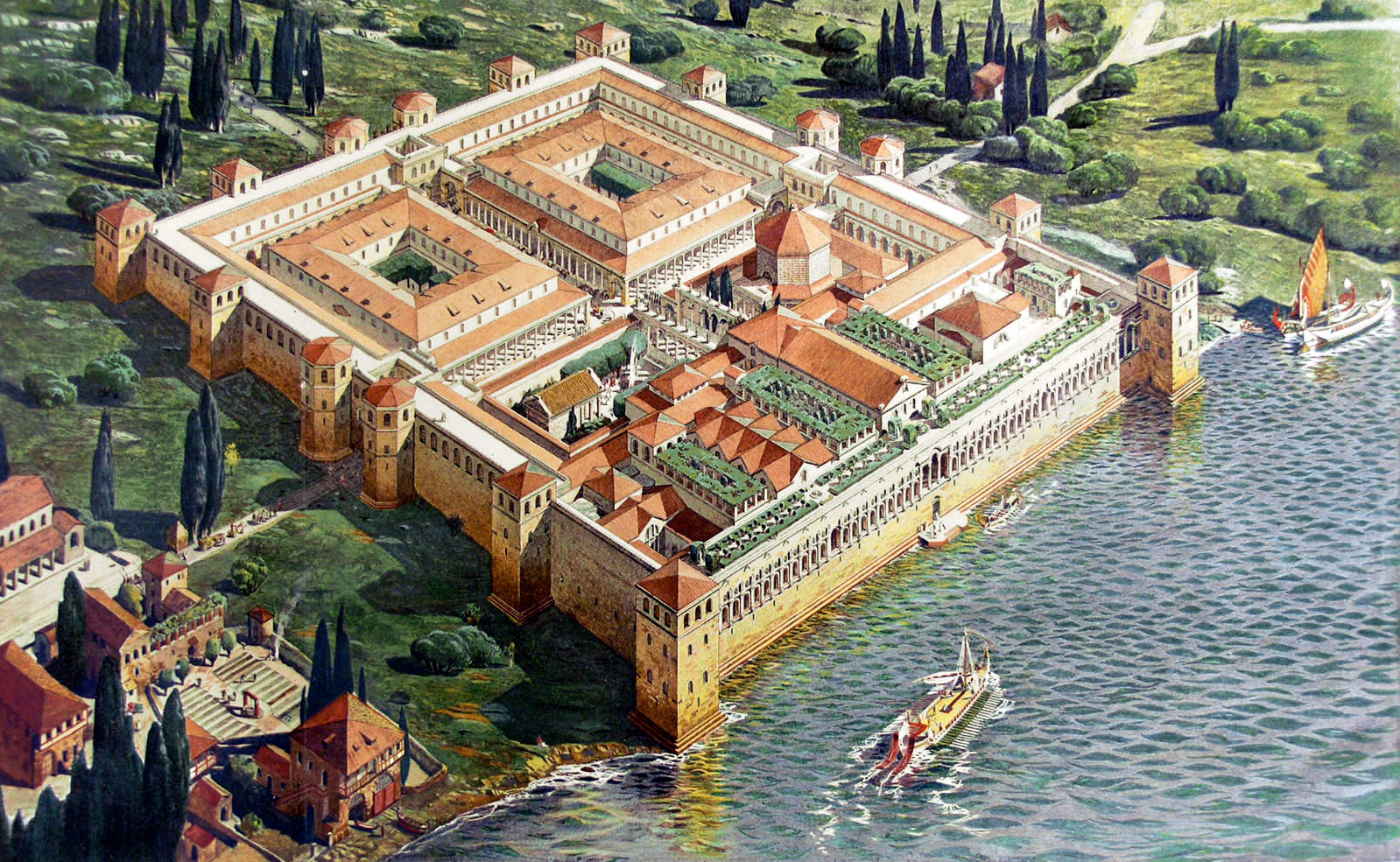
Diocletian's Palace, possibly the residence of Julius Nepos during his nominal continued reign in Dalmatia

Odoacer only nominally accepted Nepos's rule, resuming the production of gold coins in the name of Nepos at Italian mints, but taking no serious action to restore his throne. Coins of both Nepos and Zeno were minted in Italy, and Odoacer perhaps provided Nepos with a pension, but in practice ignored him. In 477 or 478, Nepos again petitioned Zeno to help him retake Italy. Also in 477, some of the remaining imperial possessions in southern Gaul rebelled against Odoacer, probably intending to fight for the restoration of Nepos. Zeno received embassies from both Odoacer and Gaul, but was forced to support Odoacer given that supporting the Gallic rebels against Odoacer would have amounted to declaring war on Odoacer, which Zeno was not prepared to do.

In 479, Nepos's hopes may have been ignited when Theodoric, the king of the Ostrogoths, offered to pledge his troops to fight for Nepos's claim. Nepos was murdered on 9 May 480, at his villa near Salona, possibly the same building as Diocletian's Palace, by members of his retinue, the comites Ovida and Viator. It is possible that the former emperor Glycerius, whom Nepos had deposed, also played a leading role in the murder, possibly as the instigator. If Glycerius was not the instigator, it is possible that the murder was caused by Nepos in 480 actively beginning to prepare his forces for a real attempt at recovering Italy militarily, and that his supporters in Dalmatia were unwilling to embark on such an adventure. Though the chroniclers of the time wrote of Nepos's violent and unexpected death, it was given little attention and no actions were taken against his murderers for quite some time. Only in late 481 or 482 did Odoacer invade Dalmatia and put Ovida, who had become the ruler of the province, to death, using Nepos's murder as a pretext to conquer the province for himself. The eastern empire made no attempt to stop him. After Nepos's death, Odoacer recognised Zeno as his new suzerain and Zeno did not appoint a new western emperor, becoming the first proper sole Roman emperor of the entire empire since the death of Theodosius I in 395 (though he continued to only effectively control the eastern provinces).

== Legacy ==
Nepos's successor in Italy, Romulus Augustulus, is typically regarded as the last western Roman emperor, though several historians argue that this distinction is better applied to Nepos, given that he continued to rule in Dalmatia with the imperial title and the full recognition, although not the full military support, of the eastern empire, until he was murdered in 480. Romulus Augustulus, by strange coincidence, shares the name of both the founder of Rome (Romulus) and its first emperor (Augustus), which may, in addition to being the last western emperor to rule Italy, have contributed to him being viewed as the last emperor over Nepos. Nepos shares a similar coincidence, in that he shares his first name, Julius, with Julius Caesar, Augustus's adoptive father and predecessor as authoritarian ruler of the Roman state.

By the time of Nepos's death in 480, the Western Roman Empire was gone, and Nepos had, in the words of the Roman historian Ralph W. Mathisen, become an "unwanted anachronism"; a hindrance to Odoacer who wished to expand into Dalmatia himself and an embarrassment to Zeno, who could not offer him his full support. Though his death was seen as marking the end of the line of emperors in the west, it was barely acknowledged at the time. By the next century, eastern Roman historians no longer recognised Nepos's reign in Dalmatia from 475 to 480 as a legitimate continuation of his imperial reign: the 6th-century eastern historians Marcellinus Comes, Procopius and Jordanes all considered the child emperor, Romulus Augustulus, to have been the last western emperor.

== Notes ==
Regnal titles
Preceded by Glycerius	Western Roman emperor 474–475	Succeeded by Romulus Augustulus
Preceded by Marcellinus	Ruler of Dalmatia; 468–480	Succeeded by Ovida
Titles in pretence
Loss of title Driven from Italy by Orestes	Western Roman emperor (Ruling from Dalmatia); 475–480	Vacant Position abolished Zeno becomes sole Roman emperor
