= Ovida =

Late Roman warlord in Dalmatia

Ruler of Dalmatia
- Reign: 9 May 480 – 481/482
- Predecessor: Julius Nepos
- Successor: Odoacer (incorporated into Kingdom of Italy)
- Died: 27 November or 9 December; 481 or 482; Dalmatia

Ovida or Odiva (died 481/482) was a late Western Roman general and warlord of likely Gothic origin and the last Roman ruler of Dalmatia. Ovida initially served Julius Nepos, ruler of Roman Dalmatia and later western Roman emperor in Italy from 474 to 475. After being usurped in 475, Nepos continued to claim the imperial title in exile in Dalmatia, supported by the Eastern Roman Empire, but he was murdered by Ovida and another general, Viator, in 480. Upon his death, Ovida became the ruler of Dalmatia, a position he held until he was defeated and killed by Odoacer, the first barbarian King of Italy, in 481 or 482.

== Background ==
Ovida or Odiva (different sources use different spellings) was a comes who served under Julius Nepos. Based on his name, he was of Germanic, presumably Gothic, origin. Nepos was the Roman provincial ruler of Dalmatia under the title magister militum Dalmatiae, having succeeded his uncle Marcellinus. In 474, Nepos became the western Roman emperor, but he was driven out of Italy in 475, returning to Dalmatia. While in exile in Dalmatia, Nepos continued to claim the imperial title, and was supported as the legitimate western emperor by the Eastern Roman Empire.

For unknown reasons, Ovida and another Germanic general, Viator, murdered Nepos on 9 May 480, near Salona. Perhaps the murder was instigated by Glycerius, Nepos' predecessor as western emperor, whom Nepos had deposed and made bishop of Salona, or perhaps it was motivated by unwillingness to partake in Nepos' planned reconquest of Italy.

== Ruler of Dalmatia ==
After Nepos' murder, Ovida became the ruler of Dalmatia. Some modern historians, such as Wolf Liebeschuetz, describe Ovida's position as a warlord. No coinage minted under Ovida has been securely identified, but it is possible that some western coins minted in Zeno's name were minted in Dalmatia, possibly under Ovida, which, if true, indicates that Ovida accepted Zeno as his new sovereign after Nepos' death. Ovida's rule in Dalmatia was not accepted by Odoacer, who had deposed Nepos' successor in Italy, Romulus Augustulus, and become the first king of Italy. Odoacer thus invaded Dalmatia. The date of Odoacer's invasion and Ovida's defeat is not certain, as different sources provide different dates, but he ruled for at least a year and a half. Ovida was defeated and put to death by Odoacer on either 27 November or 9 December, in either 481 or 482.
