= Romulus Augustulus =

Western Roman emperor from 475 to 476

Romulus Augustus
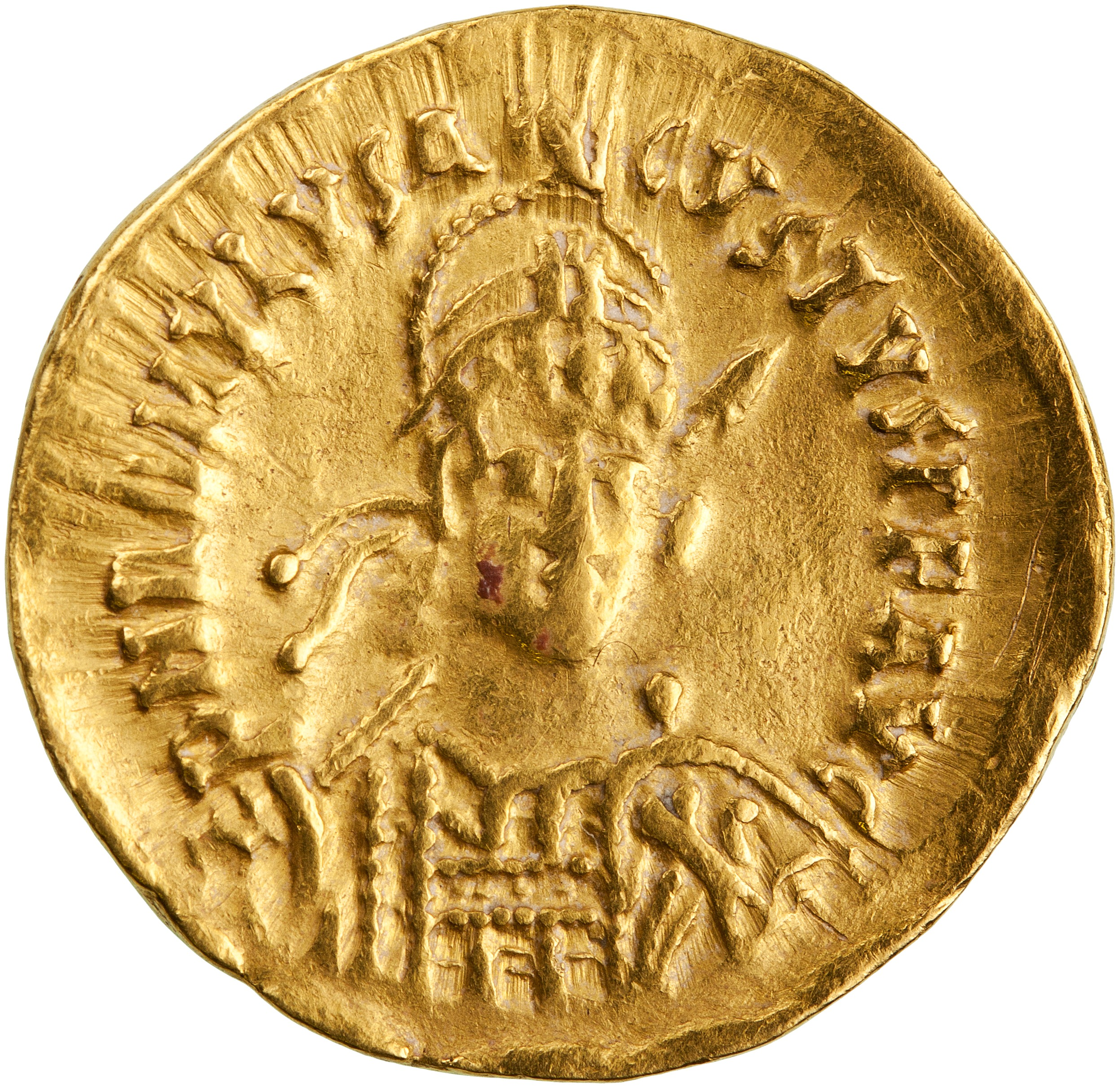
- Solidus of Romulus Augustus, inscribed: d n romvlvs avgvstvs p f avg

Roman emperor
- Reign: 31 October 475 – 4 September 476
- Predecessor: Julius Nepos (Note: Julius Nepos continued to claim the position in exile in Dalmatia until being murdered in 480.)
- Born: c. 460–465; Pannonia
- Died: c. 511–530
Regnal name
- Dominus Noster Romulus Augustus Pius Felix Augustus
- Father: Orestes
- Religion: Chalcedonian Christianity

Romulus Augustus (c. 460–465 – c. 511–530 (Note: Sources do not mention Romulus's age of accession, only that he was considered "young"; his exact birth date is not known.)), nicknamed Augustulus, was the last Roman emperor of the West from 31 October 475 until 4 September 476. Romulus was placed on the imperial throne while still a minor by his father Orestes, the magister militum, for whom he served as little more than a figurehead. After a rule of ten months, the barbarian general Odoacer defeated and killed Orestes and deposed Romulus. As Odoacer did not proclaim any successor, Romulus is typically regarded as the last Western Roman emperor, his deposition marking the end of the Western Roman Empire as a political entity. The deposition of Romulus Augustulus is also sometimes used by historians to mark the transition from antiquity to the medieval period.

Very few records survive of Romulus's reign. There are no known policies, laws or inscriptions of significance of the emperor, which leaves the impression that he was a shadowy and relatively inconsequential figure. The nickname "Augustulus" means "little Augustus" and was a derisive reference to his young age. Romulus's immediate family, including his father and possibly his mother, and maybe both his paternal and maternal grandparents, were from the Roman province of Pannonia, and many of his family members had military backgrounds.

Romulus came to power through the usurpation of his predecessor Julius Nepos (r. 474–475 in Italy) in 475. Nepos fled to Dalmatia and continued to claim the imperial title in exile, which hampered Romulus's legitimacy and ensured that he was never recognised by the Eastern Roman emperor Zeno. In 476, the allied barbarian foederati in Italy demanded Italian lands to settle on, which was refused by Orestes. Under Odoacer, the foederati defeated and killed Orestes and deposed Romulus, whereafter Odoacer became the first King of Italy and accepted Emperor Zeno as his nominal superior.

Romulus's life was spared by Odoacer, and he was allowed to retire to the castellum Lucullanum, a great fortress in Campania. Little certain information is known concerning Romulus's life in exile. He might have played a role in founding a monastery at castellum Lucullanum in the 480s or 490s, dedicated to Saint Severinus of Noricum. Romulus could have been alive as late as 507 or 511 when Theodoric the Great, Odoacer's successor, wrote a letter to a "Romulus" concerning a pension, but was likely dead before his mid-40s, as accounts of the eastern Roman invasion of Italy at that time do not mention him.

== Name ==
Romulus Augustus's birth name was simply Romulus; he was named after his maternal grandfather, a nobleman from Poetovio in Noricum. Upon his accession to the imperial throne, he also took Augustus as a proper name, not just a title. Many historians have noted the coincidence that the last western emperor bore the names of both Romulus, the legendary founder and first king of Rome, and Augustus, the first emperor. The full style used on his coinage was Dominus Noster Romulus Augustus Pius Felix Augustus. Romulus Augustus was often colloquially referred to as "Augustulus" (meaning "little Augustus") even in his own time, in reference to his youth. "Augustulus" was a derisive nickname and was never in official use; all of Romulus's coins use the names Romulus Augustus. In Greek, his first name Romulus was also changed derisively into the nickname Momylus ("little disgrace").

== Background ==
=== Geopolitical background ===
The Western (green) and Eastern (orange) Roman Empires in 476

By the time of emperor Diocletian (r. 284–305), the idea that the Roman Empire had grown so large that it would be better managed by two co-ruling emperors, rather than one, had become established. After various divisions were made throughout the 4th century, the empire was firmly and permanently divided into a western and eastern sphere of imperial administration from the death of emperor Theodosius I (r. 379–395) in 395 onwards. Though modern historians typically use the terms Western Roman Empire and Eastern Roman Empire to describe the new political situation, the Romans themselves never considered the empire to have been formally divided, still viewing it as a single unit, although most often having two rulers rather than one. Over the course of the 5th century, the western empire experienced a period of catastrophic decline. Not only were many of the rulers in the west generally lacking in competence, but they also faced enormous problems. In comparison with the eastern provinces, much of the west was more rural, with fewer people and a less stable economy. An increasing number of Germanic barbarian invasions and settlements throughout the west only added to these issues.

In 410, the Visigoths under Alaric I had sacked Rome and in 455, the last western emperor of Theodosius's dynasty, Valentinian III (r. 425–455), was deposed and murdered. That same year, Rome was sacked again for the second time in less than fifty years, this time by the Vandals. The Roman army became increasingly reliant on barbarian mercenaries and after Valentinian's murder, the most powerful barbarian generals, such as Ricimer (c. 418–472), became politically dominant, ruling through proclaiming puppet emperors. In the twenty years between the death of Valentinian and the accession of Romulus Augustus, eight different emperors ruled in the west. By 475, the western empire was in critical condition. Outside of Italy, authority was only exercised in Raetia and some regions of Gaul.

The ruling emperor in 475 was Julius Nepos, who had been in power for less than a year. Nepos had been appointed western emperor in 474 by the eastern emperors Leo I (r. 457–474) and Zeno (r. 474–491), but had little real support in the west. In 475, Nepos named Orestes as a patrician and magister militum ('master of soldiers'; effectively commander-in-chief), replacing the previous holder of that office, Ecdicius. Orestes was a distinguished late Roman figure, once having served as notarius (secretary) to the Hunnic king Attila. As magister militum, Orestes was tasked by Nepos to lead an army against Visigoths and Burgundians, foederati (barbarian allies of the empire) who were rebelling in southern Gaul. The army given to Orestes by Nepos was multi-ethnic, with many foederati soldiers. Heeding the grievances of his troops (among other things learning that Nepos had refused requests for land grants), Orestes defied the emperor's orders and marched on Ravenna, the capital of the western empire. On 28 August 475, Orestes entered Ravenna with his army and Nepos escaped across the Adriatic Sea to Salona in Dalmatia.

=== Ancestry and family ===
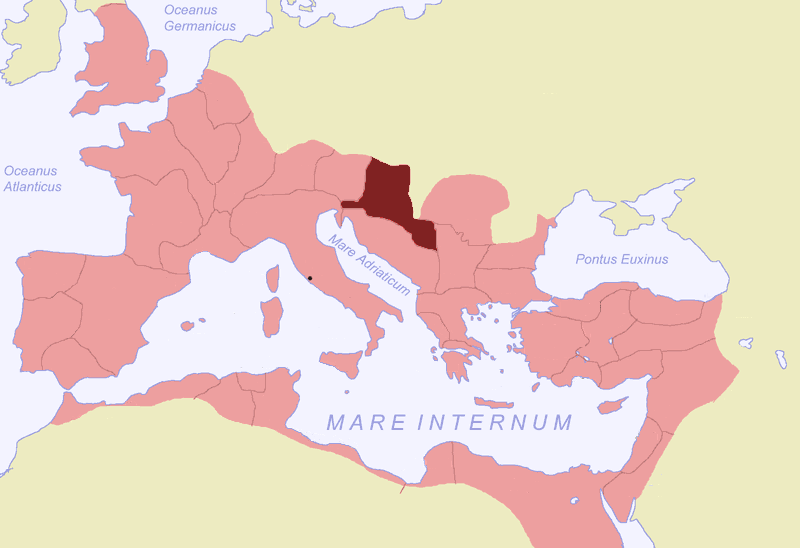
Romulus Augustus's family originated in Pannonia

There is little surviving concrete evidence in regards to Romulus's ancestry beyond Orestes being known to have been a Roman citizen from Pannonia and sparse information on his immediate family. Orestes's father was a Pannonian Roman officer by the name of Tatulus, and Tatulus had at least one other son, Paulus, who served as a comes. The name of Romulus's mother is not known, but it might have been Barbaria. (Note: Romulus's mother's name being Barbaria derives from two speculative assumptions concerning his life in exile after 476: that a "Romulus" with his mother mentioned in a 507/511 letter is the same person as Romulus Augustulus (indicating he lived alongside his mother in exile) and that a Roman noblewoman named Barbaria who is mentioned as founding a monastery at the location he was exiled to is his mother. The identification is not without merit: Barbaria was a wealthy noblewoman, who lived in the building Romulus had been exiled to and was knowledgeable about affairs in Noricum (having venerated Severinus of Noricum), the province bordering Pannonia. In the past almost accepted as fact, recent research has emphasized that Barbaria being Romulus's mother is only a hypothesis.) The name Barbaria, otherwise rarely attested, may derive either from the gens (family) Barbii, attested in Roman Pannonia, or it may simply be the feminine version of the name Barbarius, attested from a few Roman individuals in southern Gaul. Another hypothesis identifies Romulus's mother as Flavia Serena. Romulus's maternal grandfather was a comes, also by the name of Romulus, attested as alive in 449, when he was sent on an embassy to Attila by the general Aetius. Orestes and Romulus Augustus's mother married at some point before 449. It is believed that Romulus's mother, and thus perhaps her immediate family, were, like Orestes, from Roman Pannonia.

It is possible that Romulus Augustus had older siblings, especially given that Romulus was born several years after the marriage of his parents. In ancient Rome, it was customary for the eldest son to be named after his grandfather. That Romulus was not named Tatulus thus indicates that he was not the firstborn boy.

== Reign ==
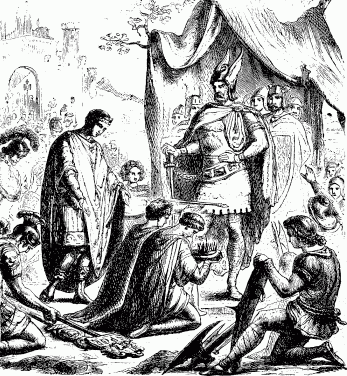
19th-century illustration of Romulus Augustus surrendering his crown in front of Odoacer

After an interregnum in the west lasting two months, Romulus, perhaps as young as ten years old, was proclaimed emperor in Nepos's stead by Orestes on 31 October 475. He was the last emperor to be proclaimed in the west. Why the interregnum since Nepos lasted so long and why Orestes, a high-ranking military official and a Roman by birth, did not take the imperial title for himself is not known. It is possible that Orestes was waiting for some form of formal recognition or response from emperor Zeno in the east, which never came. Romulus would throughout his brief ten-month reign be little more than a figurehead, with his father, who retained the position of magister militum, actually running much of the imperial administration. Zeno never recognised the rule of Romulus as emperor in the west, given that Nepos, invested as emperor by Zeno's predecessor Leo I, still ruled in exile in Dalmatia.

Problems with the Western Roman army, mainly composed of barbarian foederati, had escalated throughout the 470s. The issues the army had with the central government had been what allowed Orestes to depose Nepos. In 476, the barbarian foederati in Italy, composed mainly of the Herules, Scirians and Turcilingians, demanded land in Italy to settle on. Orestes refused. The leader of the foederati was Odoacer, a barbarian officer of undetermined tribal affiliation. Orestes had once worked alongside Odoacer's father Edeko at the court of Attila. On 28 August 476, Odoacer defeated Orestes in battle at Ticinum, captured him and had him executed.

On 4 September, (Note: The Fasti vindobonenses priores gives 4 September (pridie nonas Septembris), while the Auctarium Prosperi Havniense gives 31 August (pridie kalendas Septembris), one of which is a corruption of the other. The Fasti dates are usually considered the most reliable, hence why they are the ones often used in modern scholarship. Furthermore, the Fasti date "is to be preferred due to the time needed to march across the north of Italy".) Odoacer captured Ravenna, killing Orestes's deputy and brother Paulus during the fighting. Romulus was captured and deposed, whereafter Odoacer assumed control of Italy as its first king. Odoacer sent Romulus's western imperial regalia to emperor Zeno in the east, and swore allegiance to him, ruling without further imperial successors in the west. According to the 5th-century Eastern Roman writer and historian Malchus, Odoacer may have forced Romulus himself, as his last official act as emperor, to send the imperial regalia and a "letter of resignation" to Zeno, writing that the Roman Empire from this point only required a single emperor, ruling from Constantinople. Though Zeno granted Odoacer the distinction of patrician, he also urged the king to accept Julius Nepos back as emperor in Italy. Though Odoacer nominally accepted Nepos as his sovereign, minting coins in his name, Nepos was never able to reoccupy Italy.

== Later life ==
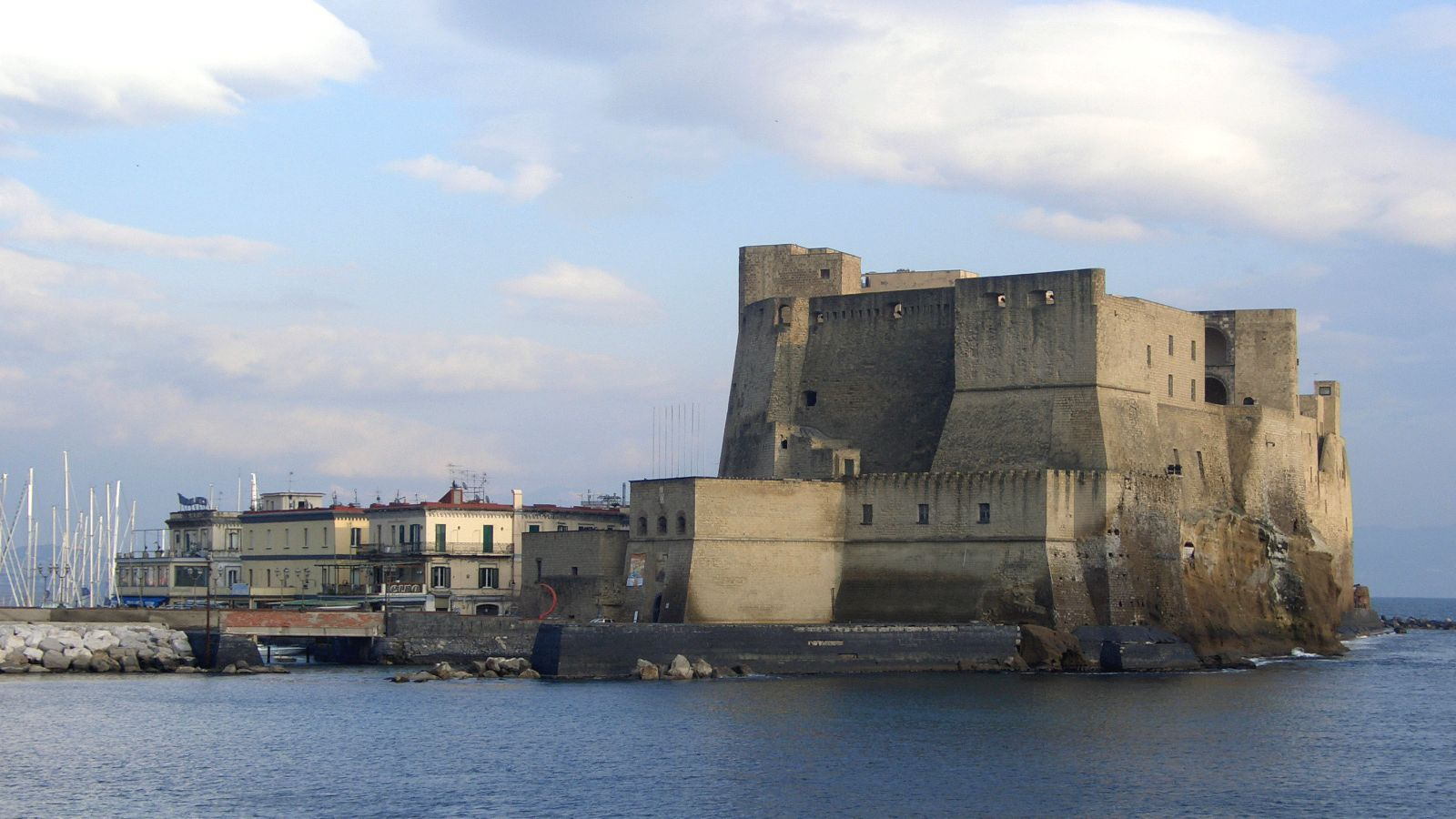
Castel dell'Ovo or castellum Lucullanum in Naples in southern Italy, where Romulus Augustus lived following his deposition in 476. This is a more recent structure than the one to which he was exiled.

Odoacer spared the life of the young Romulus on account of his "youth and beauty". Romulus was granted an annual pension of 6,000 solidi (the normal income of a wealthy Roman senator) and granted an estate in Campania, near Naples, called the Castellum Lucullanum (today called Castel dell'Ovo), originally built by the consul and general Lucius Licinius Lucullus in the 60s BC. Castellum Lucullanum had once served as the retirement villa of Tiberius (r. 14–37), Rome's second emperor. By late antiquity, Castellum Lucullanum was likely fortified, and it likely functioned as a small administrative and military centre in Campania. Romulus was accompanied to Campania by a large retinue and some of his surviving relatives.

Romulus may have been alive as late as 507 or 511, when Theodoric the Great, Odoacer's successor as king of Italy, wrote to a "Romulus" to confirm a grant made to him and his mother by Petrus Marcellinus Felix Liberius, the praetorian prefect of Italy, on Theodoric's authority. Per Thomas Hodgkin, who translated the letter in 1886, the identification of Romulus in the letter as Romulus Augustus is strengthened by the name "Romulus" by this point not being very common and by the letter not giving the Romulus in question any titles or honorifics. (Note: The letter is simply addressed Romulo Theodoricus rex, "King Theodoric to Romulus".) The absence of titles differentiates the letter from the vast majority of other letters preserved from Theodoric, as if neither the king nor his scribe were quite sure how to address a former emperor. If the Romulus in the letter is the same person as Romulus Augustulus, it is possible that the letter indicates that Romulus and his family had to renegotiate their financial arrangements and pension with the king because they had been drawn up under the reign of a different king. Given that Romulus is not mentioned in accounts of the later eastern Roman invasion of Italy in the mid-530s, he had likely died some time before the conflict.

Romulus may have played a role in founding a monastery around the remains of Saint Severinus of Noricum at castellum Lucullanum in the 480s or early 490s. A Roman noblewoman by the name of Barbaria, possibly Romulus's mother, also aided in founding the monastery. This monastery became prominent under Pope Gregory I (r. 590–604) and was active until the 10th century.

== Legacy ==
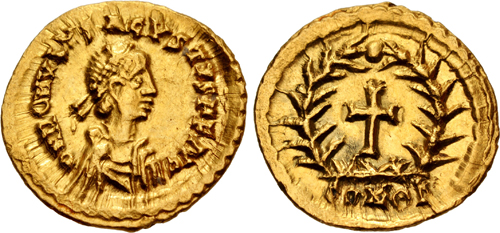
Tremissis of Romulus Augustus

Very few records survive of Romulus's reign. Any policies that he might have pursued are not known. The scant narrative record and few known coins, in addition to there not being any known inscriptions of significance or laws issued by the emperor, make him a shadowy and relatively inconsequential figure. Ralph W. Mathisen considered him in 1997 to have been "perhaps even the least significant" of the short-lived emperors near the end of the Western Roman Empire. When not seen as only inconsequential, opinions by historians on Romulus Augustus have been negative. In The History of the Decline and Fall of the Roman Empire (1776–1788), Edward Gibbon wrote that he "assumed and disgraced the names of Romulus [and] Augustus".

Romulus Augustus is typically regarded as the last Western Roman emperor, or even the last Roman emperor overall, (Note: This assessment derives from the historiographical separation of the later eastern Roman Empire, often termed the "Byzantine Empire" by modern historians, from ancient Rome. In the east, the Roman Empire survived for another millennium, with the populace and the emperors regarding themselves as "Roman", until its fall in 1453.) with his deposition seen as marking the end of the Western Roman Empire as a political entity. The deposition of Romulus is also one of the most commonly used dates by historians to mark the transition from antiquity to the medieval period. Romulus being seen as the last emperor over other contenders derives not only from Romulus having been the last emperor proclaimed in the west, but also from the poetic nature of being named after both Romulus, the founder of Rome, and Augustus, the first Roman emperor. Many historians have noted the coincidence that the last emperor combined the names of both the city's founder and the first emperor. In The History of the Decline and Fall of the Roman Empire, Gibbon wrote that "the appellations of the two great founders of the city and of the monarchy were thus strangely united in the last of their successors".

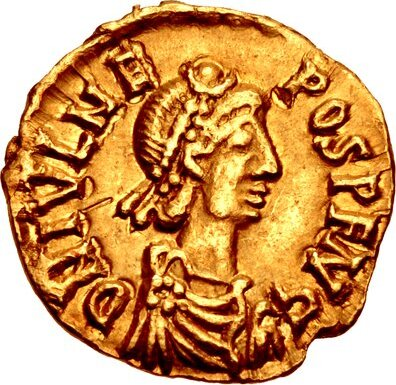
Tremissis of Julius Nepos (r. 474–475/480), Romulus Augustus's predecessor

Some modern scholars consider Romulus's distinction as the last western emperor to be dubious. In particular, some historians, such as Ralph W. Mathisen and Marjeta Šašel Kos, have pointed to Julius Nepos as the actual last Western Roman emperor. Though he never regained Italy, Nepos continued to rule in Dalmatia, with support from Zeno and with nominal recognition by Odoacer, until he was murdered in 480. Throughout the duration of his brief reign, Romulus was never recognised in Constantinople, with the eastern court instead continuing to recognise Nepos as the legitimate western emperor.

Though none would be widely recognised thereafter, Nepos also was not the last person to claim the western empire. From about 477 to 516, the Moorish dux Masties in North Africa claimed to be an emperor. In Visigothic Hispania, two Roman usurpers rose from the Ebro valley, attempting to claim imperial authority: Burdunellus (496) and Petrus (506).

Romulus Augustus being identified as the last emperor of the western empire is a tradition that began already among eastern Roman historians and writers in the early 6th century. The earliest known writer to consider him as such was Marcellinus Comes (died c. 534), who wrote the following passage concerning Romulus:

The western Empire of the Roman people, which first began in the seven hundred and ninth year after the founding of the City with Octavian Augustus, the first of the emperors, perished with this Augustulus, in the five-hundred and twenty-second year of the reign of Augustus's successor emperors. From this point on Gothic kings held power in Rome. (Note: There are exactly 709 years between 753 BC (traditional founding of Rome) and 44 BC (death of Julius Caesar), and 520 years between that year and AD 476 (counted inclusively). The number DXX (520) may have been corrupted into DXXII (522).)

Later Eastern Roman authors continued to regard him as the last emperor of the western empire. Procopius (c. 500 – after 565) considered Romulus to have been the last legitimate ruler in the west, as did Jordanes (also 6th century).

== Sources ==
- Bury, John Bagnell (2015) [1889]. A History of the Later Roman Empire from Arcadius to Irene (395 A.D. to 800 A.D.). Cambridge: Cambridge University Press. ISBN 978-1316219133.
- Collins, Roger (2004). Visigothic Spain, 409–711. Oxford: Blackwell Publishing. ISBN 0-631-18185-7.
- Corning, Caitlin (2015). "Early Medieval World". World History, A Short, Visual Introduction. Minneapolis: Fortress Press. ISBN 978-1506402871.
- Gibbon, Edward (1872) [1788]. The History of the Decline and Fall of the Roman Empire. Vol. IV. London: Bell & Daldy.
- Heather, Peter (2015). "Romulus Augustulus, Roman emperor, 475–476 CE". Oxford Classical Dictionary. Oxford Research Encyclopedias. doi:10.1093/acrefore/9780199381135.013.5611. ISBN 978-0-19-938113-5.
- Herrin, Judith (2019). Ravenna: Capital of Empire, Crucible of Europe. Princeton: Princeton University Press. doi:10.1515/9780691201979. ISBN 978-0691201979. S2CID 239300289.
- Hodgkin, Thomas (2018) [1886]. The Letters of Cassiodorus: Being a Condensed Translation of the Variae Epistolae of Magnus Aurelius Cassiodorus Senator. Frankfurt: Outlook Verlag. ISBN 978-3734024597.
- Hughes, Ian (2015). Patricians and Emperors: The Last Rulers of the Western Roman Empire. Casemate Publishers. ISBN 978-1-4738-6644-7.
- Jones, Arnold Hugh Martin; Martindale, J. R.; Morris, John, eds. (1980). The Prospography of the Later Roman Empire: Volume II: AD 395–527. Cambridge University Press. ISBN 978-0-521-20159-9.
- Kos, Marjeta Šašel (2008). "The family of Romulus Augustulus". Antike Lebenswelten : Konstanz, Wandel, Wirkungsmacht : Festschrift für Ingomar Weiler zum 70. Geburtstag. Wiesbaden: Harrassowitz Verlag. OCLC 496844565.
- Loewenstein, Karl (1973). The Governance of Rome. Dordrecht: Springer. doi:10.1007/978-94-010-2400-6. ISBN 978-9024714582.
- Mathisen, Ralph W. (1997). "Romulus Augustulus (475–476 A.D.) – Two Views". De Imperatoribus Romanis. Archived from the original on 7 July 2019.
- McEvoy, Meaghan (2012). "Romulus Augustulus". In Bagnall, Roger S; Brodersen, Kai; Champion, Craige B; Erskine, Andrew; Huebner, Sabine R (eds.). The Encyclopedia of Ancient History. John Wiley & Sons. doi:10.1002/9781444338386. hdl:1808/11108. ISBN 978-1444338386.
- Mommsen, Theodor (1892). Chronica minora. Monumenta Germaniae Historica. Vol. 9. Berlin: Weidmannsche Buchhandlung.
- Murdoch, Adrian. ''The Last Roman and the Decline of the West: Romulus Augustulus'' The History Press, 2006.
- Nathan, Geoffrey S. (1997). "Romulus Augustulus (475–476 A.D.) – Two Views". De Imperatoribus Romanis. Archived from the original on 7 July 2019.
- Rebenich, Stefan (2009). "Late Antiquity in Modern Eyes" (PDF). In Rousseau, Philip (ed.). A Companion to Late Antiquity. Malden: Blackwell Publishing. doi:10.1002/9781444306101. ISBN 978-1405119801.
- Sandberg, Kaj (2008). "The So-Called Division of the Roman Empire. Notes On A Persistent Theme in Western Historiography". Arctos: Acta Philologica Fennica. 42: 199–213. doi:10.71390/arctos.85853.
- Thompson, Edward Arthur (1982). Romans and Barbarians: The Decline of the Western Empire. Madison: University of Wisconsin Press. ISBN 0-299-08700-X.
- Yves Modéran (2003). Les Maures and l'Afrique romaine. 4e.–7e. siècle (= Bibliothèque des écoles françaises d'Athènes et de Rome, vol. 314) (in French). Rome: Publications de l'École française de Rome. ISBN 2-7283-0640-0.

Regnal titles
Preceded by Julius Nepos	Western Roman emperor 475–476 with Julius Nepos in Dalmatia	Succeeded by Zeno I as Roman emperor in the east
Preceded by Julius Nepos	Western Roman emperor 475–476 with Julius Nepos in Dalmatia	Succeeded by Odoacer as king of Italy
Preceded by Julius Nepos	Western Roman emperor 475–476 with Julius Nepos in Dalmatia	Succeeded by Julius Nepos as emperor-claimant in Dalmatia
