= Glycerius =

Western Roman emperor from 473 to 474

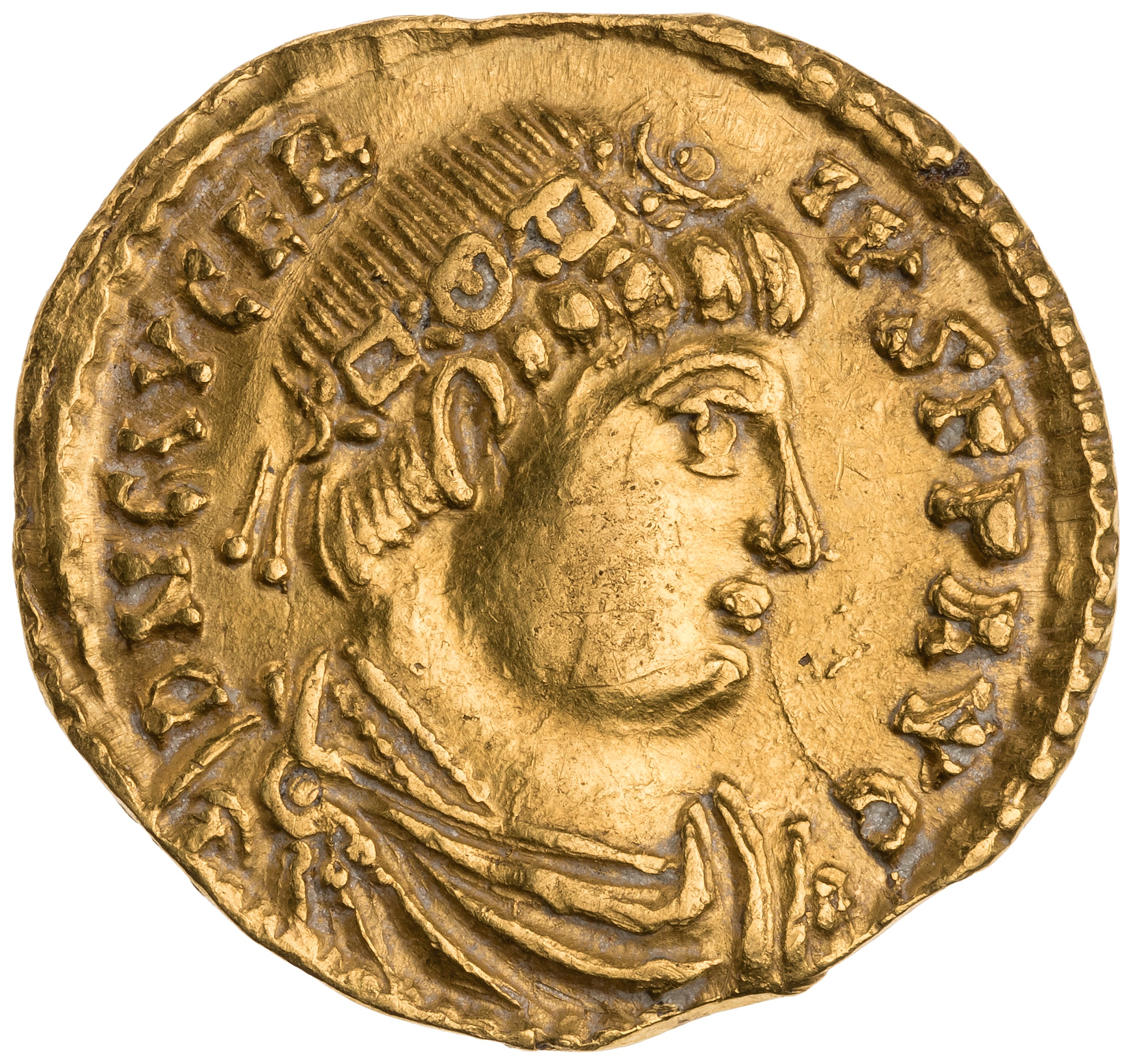
- Solidus of Glycerius marked: d·n· glycerius p·f· aug·

Roman emperor in the West
- Reign: 3/5 March 473 – 24 June 474
- Predecessor: Olybrius
- Successor: Julius Nepos
- Eastern emperors: Leo I (457–474); Leo II (474)
- Died: After 474 (possibly 480); Dalmatia
- Religion: Chalcedonian Christianity

Glycerius (fl. 470s) was Roman emperor of the West from 473 to 474. He served as comes domesticorum (commander of the palace guard) during the reign of Olybrius (r. 472), until Olybrius died in November 472. After a four-month interregnum, Glycerius was proclaimed as emperor in March 473 by Gundobad, the magister militum (master of soldiers) and power behind the throne. Very few of the events of his reign are known other than that an attempted invasion of Italy by the Visigoths was repelled by local commanders, diverting them to Gaul. Glycerius also prevented an invasion by the Ostrogoths through diplomacy, including a gift of 2,000 solidi.

Glycerius was not recognized by the Eastern Roman emperor Leo I (r. 457–474), who instead nominated Julius Nepos (r. 474–475/480) as Western Emperor and sent him with an army to invade the Western Empire. Glycerius was without allies because Gundobad had abandoned him, and therefore was forced to abdicate on 24 June 474, and was succeeded by Nepos. He was appointed Bishop of Salona, which position he held until his death. He died, possibly in 480, and a nearly contemporaneous source blames him for the assassination of Nepos, but the records for this event are muddled.

== Life ==
=== Background ===
The historian Penny MacGeorge states that "almost nothing is known of Glycerius". While MacGeorge wrote that he was "presumably" an upper-class Italian, his family is unknown, and may not have been aristocratic. He rose to the office of comes domesticorum (commander of the palace guard), and likely served as such during the reign of Western Roman Emperor Olybrius (r. 472). The Germanic magister militum (master of soldiers) Ricimer had deposed the Western Roman Emperor Majorian (r. 457–461) in 461, and thereafter installed a series of Western Roman emperors as puppets: Libius Severus (r. 461–465), Anthemius (r. 467–472), and Olybrius, enthroned in July 472, after Ricimer overthrew Anthemius. Ricimer died on 18 August 472, forty days after deposing Anthemius, and was succeeded as magister militum and kingmaker by his Burgundian nephew Gundobad. Olybrius died shortly thereafter, on 2 November 472, and an interregnum ensued for nearly four months, before Gundobad convinced Glycerius to assume the throne, and proclaimed him as emperor at Ravenna: the Fasti vindobonenses, a record of consular years, states that it was on 5 March 473, however, the Paschale campanum, also a consular record, asserts it was on the 3rd.

=== Reign ===
Few events of Glycerius's reign are known. Glycerius is known from a few fragmented references in what historian Ralph Mathisen calls "jejune chronicles", such as the Annales of Marcellinus Comes, the Gallic Chronicle of 511, and the Chronicle of Saragossa, as well as some small references provided by the 6th-century writer Jordanes and the bishop Ennodius. Under Glycerius, invasions by both the Visigoths and the Ostrogoths were repelled, through a mixture of diplomatic and military activities. The Visigoths and Ostrogoths were Germanic groups that were settled in Gallia Aquitania, and Pannonia Prima and Valeria, respectively, as foederati. In 473, the Visigothic king Euric (r. 466–484) ordered an invasion of Italy, his commander, Vincentius, was killed by the Comites (regional commanders) Alla and Sindila. After Vincentius was killed, Euric chose instead to invade Gaul, occupying both Arles and Marseille. The Ostrogothic king Videmir (r. 469–474) proposed to invade Italy, but Glycerius was able to dissuade Videmir through the gift of 2,000 solidi (high-value gold coins), (Note: The solidus at the time was approximately 4.64 grams (0.164 oz) of gold, so this would constitute roughly 9.28 kilograms (20.5 lb) of gold.) and diverted them from Italy to Gaul, where surrounding groups, described by Jordanes as "various peoples", later attacked them. Mathisen comments that these actions to defend the empire may be the reason that Glycerius receives a generally favorable reception in Roman and Byzantine sources. The 9th-century historian Theophanes describes him only as a "not despicable man", but Ennodius, the bishop of Pavia, describes him more thoroughly in his Vita St. Epiphanius:

After Olybrius, Glycerius ascended to the rule. With regard to whom I summarize, in my desire for brevity, the numerous things he did for the well being of many people. For, when the blessed man [Bishop Epiphanius of Pavia] interceded, he pardoned the injury done to his mother by some men under his authority.

Mathisten states that the aforementioned injuries to Glycerius's mother may have been in reaction to his bribery of Videmir, but remarks that "such measures were a regular part of imperial policy", and speculates that the attackers may have been soldiers, explaining their lack of punishment. Glycerius seems to have primarily reigned in northern Italy, as all the coins found from his reign but one were minted in either Ravenna or Milan. The only law enacted by Glycerius which has survived was dated 11 March 473, and issued to Himilco, the Praetorian prefect of Italy, and later reissued to the Praetorian prefects of Illyricum, the East, and Gaul, regarding simony (the selling of church offices). It was adopted not just by the prefects of Italy and Gaul, who were a part of the Western Roman Empire, but also by the prefects of Illyricum and the East, despite the fact that he did not have the authority to issue laws to them. The law was designed to grant Glycerius the support of the clergy, but would likely also have appealed to the senatorial class, who were concerned about increasingly violent elections, as well as the use of church funds by clergy for personal reasons. This law was also the last known one issued by a Western Roman emperor.

It is possible that Glycerius attempted reconciliation with the Eastern Roman Empire, evidenced by the fact that Glycerius did not nominate a consul for 474, and instead accepted the eastern consul, the infant Emperor Leo II (r. 473–474). Despite this, the Eastern Roman Emperor, Leo I (r. 457–474), refused to recognize Glycerius as emperor because he was merely a puppet of Gundobad. Emperor Leo instead chose to recognize one of his own men, Julius Nepos (r. 474–475/480), and sent him with a fleet to invade the Western Empire. The 7th-century historian John of Antioch states that Leo made the decision to remove Glycerius after hearing that he had assumed the throne of the Western Roman Empire, but Mathisen comments that Leo must have hesitated for some time, as the actual invasion was delayed by the onset of winter, and Julius Nepos was forced to wait until the beginning of spring to launch his invasion.

Glycerius was without allies, as Gundobad seemingly abandoned him, leaving him with no option but to surrender. After Nepos landed at Ostia in June 474, Glycerius abdicated on 24 June 474, in Ravenna, and Nepos assumed the throne. The historian John Michael O'Flynn states that the "circumstances surrounding this speedy overthrow are obscure and, at first sight, puzzling", noting that while the forces of Nepos were likely small, Gundobad made no moves to counter them, but rather "disappeared entirely from the Italian scene." He speculates that, while Gundobad could have put up stiff resistance, rather than attempting to oppose the imperial legitimacy of Leo, he accepted Leo's authority to reject Glycerius as an imperial colleague and to install one of his own choosing. Additionally, Glycerius seems to never have attracted the favor of the Roman Senate or the Gallo-Roman aristocracy, which would make the decision to back him, and therefore alienate both, far less palatable for Gundobad. Notably, as king of Burgundy, Gundobad (r. 473/474–516) enjoyed warm relations with the Eastern Roman Empire, which he served as a foederatus (treaty subject). Mathisen suggests the alternatives that Gundobad was attempting to raise further troops in Gaul, or that he left to ensure he received his inheritance after the death of his father, King Gondioc (r. 437–473).

=== Later life ===
After being deposed, Glycerius was promptly ordained as Bishop of Salona in Dalmatia. According to the 5th-century Byzantine historian Malchus, Glycerius had some part in organizing the assassination of Julius Nepos in 480, after Nepos had been forced to flee Italy and was ruling in exile in Dalmatia, although the historical records for the assassination are muddled. Glycerius died sometime after 474, possibly in 480. He has sometimes been identified with a Glycerius who was Archbishop of Milan by King Odoacer (r. 476–493), but this is likely incorrect. The source for the promotion of Glycerius to archbishop is an obscure line written by Ennodius, in which he praises an archbishop named Glycerius, among other archbishops of Milan, however, this section seems to have been either corrupted or added later, to identify the archbishop Glycerius with the emperor Glycerius.

Regnal titles
Preceded by Olybrius	Western Roman emperor 473–474	Succeeded by Julius Nepos
