= List of ancient Roman fasti =

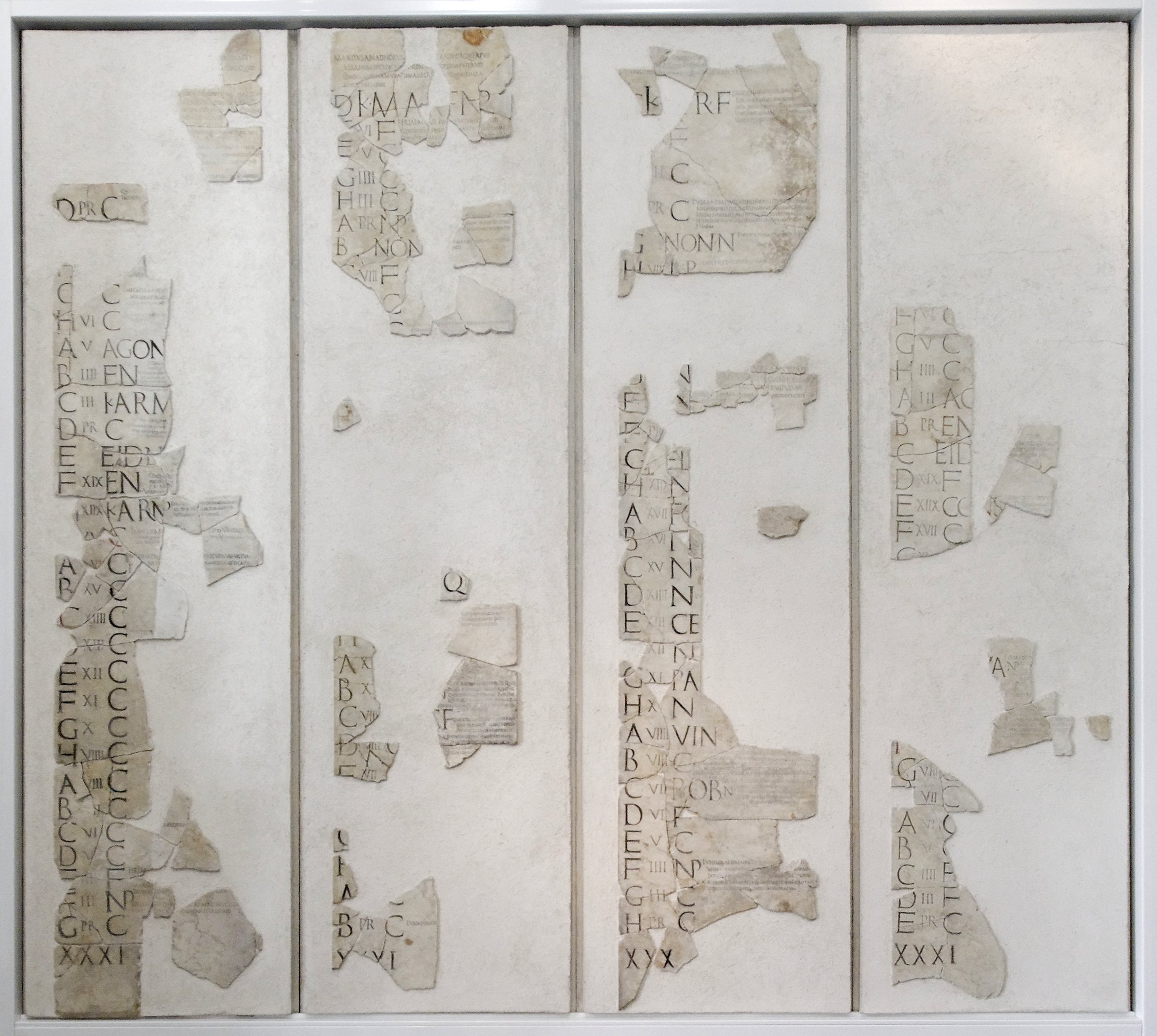
Fragments of the Fasti Praenestini

Ancient Roman fasti were calendars (fasti) that recorded religious observances and officially commemorated events. They were typically displayed in the form of an inscription at a prominent public location such as a major temple; several of these fasti survive, but in states of varying fragmentation. Some calendars are preserved as papyri or manuscripts.

One of the original purposes of Roman calendars was to mark the religious and legal status of each day, by means of letters such as C, F, and NP. By the late 2nd century AD, extant calendars no longer show days marked with these letters, probably in part as a result of calendar reforms undertaken by Marcus Aurelius. A feriale is a listing only of dates for religious or official observances, not a day-by-day accounting of time. The words fasti and feriale are not always distinct in usage, and both fasti and ferialia are listed below.

Extant fasti include those known by the following names:

- Fasti Allifani (CIL IX 2320)
- Fasti Amiternini, dating to the reign of Tiberius, were found at Amiternum (now San Vittorino) in Sabine territory.
- Fasti Antiates Maiores (84–55 BC), from the colonia of Antium, is the earliest Roman calendar to survive; its large size (1.16m by 2.5 m) allowed the presentation of complex condensed information.
- Fasti Antiates Ministrorum Domus Augustae, also from Antium, includes a list of ministri from the imperial household as well as a calendar.
- Feriale Cumanum (4–14 AD), from Cumae, was produced during the reign of Augustus and marks several occasions of relevance to the establishment of Imperial cult. These include a supplication for Jupiter Sempiternus to commemorate the assumption of the fasces by Augustus, sacrifices on the birthday of Augustus, and the date on which he assumed the toga virilis. It is one of only two ancient sources that record the first consulship of Augustus (disputed as August 19 or September 22), the other being the senatus consultum that renamed the month of Sextilis Augustus (August). The goddess Vesta is prominent in this feriale.
- Feriale Duranum, a calendar of religious observances for a military unit stationed in Dura-Europos, Roman Syria in the 3rd century AD.
- Fasti Esquilini
- Fasti Guidizzolenses, a small stone calendar (55 by 30 cm) probably produced for private use, found in Augusta Brixia (present-day Brescia), a civic colony (colonia civica). It is arranged month-by-month in columns, with the Kalends, Nones and Ides marked. These columns contain no letters marking the nundinal cycle or the status of days under religious law, nor holidays. Information on festivals is given in a small feriale (festival calendar) on the right side of the main calendar.

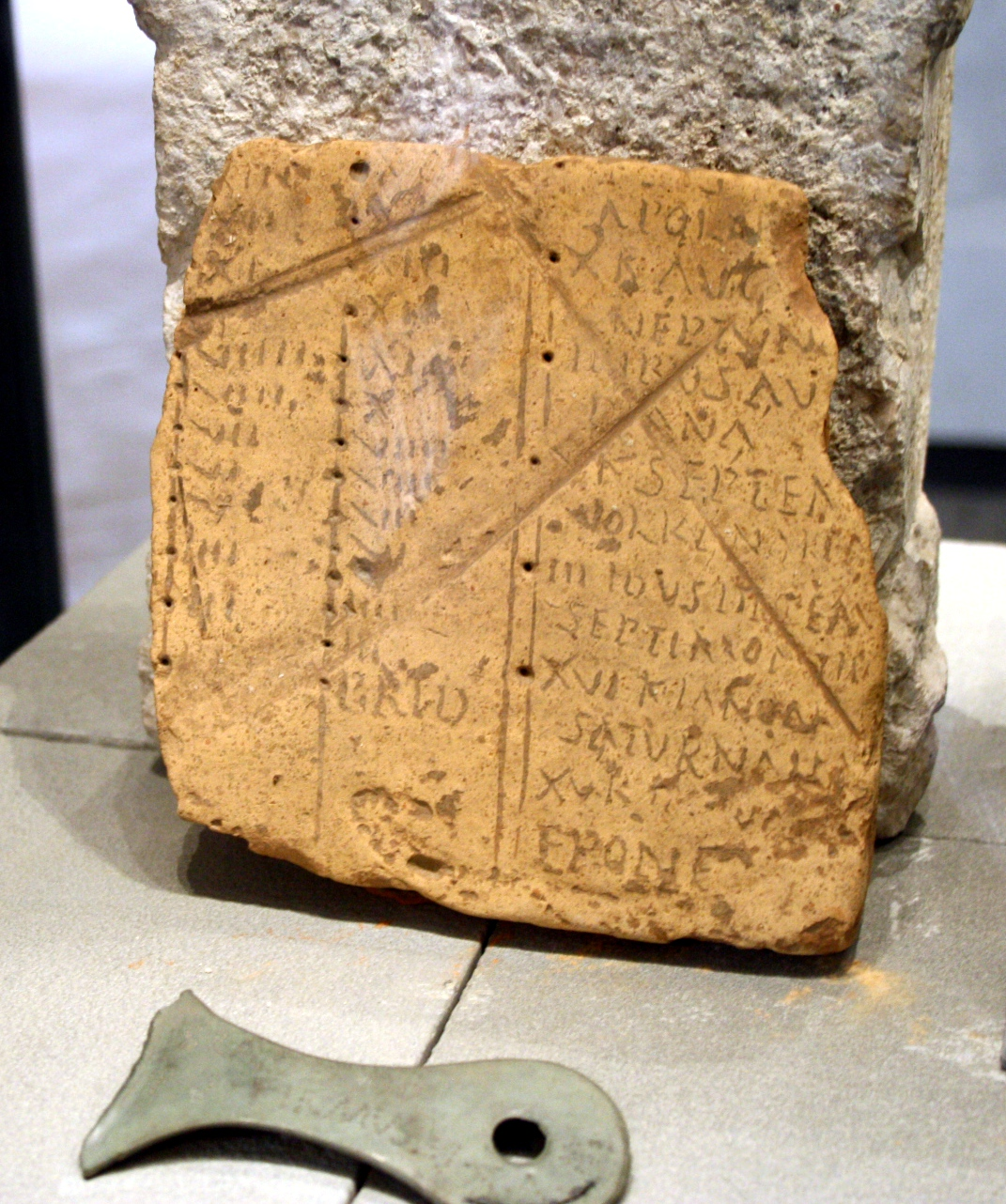
Fragment of the Fasti Guidizzolenses

- Fasti Maffeiani, both one of the smallest examples (90 by 70 cm) and one of the most complete. Its date is uncertain; Mario Torelli places it as 8 AD or later.
- Fasti Ostienses, fragmentary marble slabs from Ostia Antica. In addition to religious observances, they record events from 49 BC to 175 AD, listing the consuls for each year, events of significance to the Empire as a whole, the local duoviri, and some local events.
- Fasti Praenestini, with antiquarian commentary on the Roman calendar by Verrius Flaccus. It lacks astronomical notices.
- Fasti Vallenses
- Fasti Vaticani, dating 15–31 AD, under the reign of Tiberius.
- Fasti Venusini
- Fasti Verulani
- Fasti Vindobonenses, found in the Vindobonensis manuscript (MS. 3416), together with the Chronography of 354. There are two sets, one covering 44 BC to 403 AD, and 455 to 493 AD; and the other 44 BC to 397 AD, 439 to 455 AD, and 495 to 539.

== See also ==
- Consularia Italica
- Liber Linteus, with an Etruscan calendar
- Menologia rustica, ancient Roman farmers' almanacs
- Polemius Silvius
- Roman calendar and Julian calendar
- Roman festivals
