= Dalmatia (Roman province) =

Roman province

Provincia Dalmatia
- Province of the Roman Empire
- 32 BC–c. 640 AD
- Province of Dalmatia within the Empire
- Capital: Salona
- Government
- Governor
  - 19–16 BC (first): Publius Silius Nerva
  - 480–481/2 (last): Ovida
- Historical era: Antiquity
  - Illyrian Wars: 220 BC–168 BC
  - Established: 32 BC
  - Disestablished: c. 640 AD
Preceded by	Succeeded by
Illyricum (Roman province)	Ostrogothic Kingdom

Dalmatia was a Roman province. Its name is derived from the name of an Illyrian tribe called the Dalmatae, which lived in the central area of the eastern coast of the Adriatic Sea. It encompassed the northern part of present-day Albania, much of Croatia, Bosnia and Herzegovina, Montenegro, and Serbia, thus covering an area significantly larger than the current Croatian and Montenegrin region of Dalmatia. Originally this region was called Illyria (in Greek) or Illyricum (in Latin).

The province of Illyricum was dissolved and replaced by two separate provinces: Dalmatia and Pannonia.

== Conquest ==
The region which ran along the coast of the Adriatic Sea and extended inland on the Dinaric Alps was called Illyria by the Greeks. Originally, the Romans also called the area Illyria and later, Illyricum. The Romans fought three Illyrian Wars (229 BC, 219/8 BC and 168 BC) mainly against the kingdom of the Ardiaei to the south of the region. In 168 BC, they abolished this kingdom and divided it into three republics. The area became a Roman protectorate. The central and northern area of the region engaged in piracy and raided north-eastern Italy. In response, Octavian (who later became the emperor Augustus) conducted a series of campaigns in Illyricum (35–33 BC). The area became the Roman senatorial province of Illyricum probably in 27 BC. Due to troubles in the northern part of the region in 16–10 BC, it became an imperial province. The administrative organisation of Illyricum was carried out late in the reign of Augustus (27 BC – 14 AD) and early in the reign of Tiberius (14–37 AD).

== Part of Illyricum ==
Due to Octavian having subdued the more inland region of Pannonia (along the mid-course of the River Danube), the Romans changed the name of the coastal area to Dalmatia. In 6–9 AD, there was a large scale rebellion in the province of Illyricum, the Bellum Batonianum (Batonian War). First-century Roman historian Velleius Paterculus describes Gaius Vibius Postumus as the military commander of Dalmatia under Germanicus in 9 AD; this is the earliest extant writing which indicates that the province of Illyricum comprised Dalmatia and Pannonia.

The province of Illyricum was eventually dissolved and replaced by two smaller provinces: Dalmatia (the southern area) and Pannonia (the northern and Danubian area). It is unclear when this happened. Kovác noted that an inscription on the base of a statue of Nero erected between 54 and 68 AD attests that it was erected by the veteran of a legion stationed in Pannonia and argues that this is the first epigraphic evidence that a separate Pannonia existed at least since the reign of Nero. However, Šašel-Kos notes that an inscription attests a governor of Illyricum under the reign of Claudius (41–54 AD) and in a military diploma published in the late 1990s, dated July 61 AD, units of auxiliaries from the Pannonian part of the province were mentioned as being stationed in Illyricum. Some other diplomas attest the same. This was during the reign of Nero (54–68 AD). Therefore, Šašel-Kos supports the notion that the province was dissolved during the reign of Vespasian (69–79 AD).

== Administrative changes ==
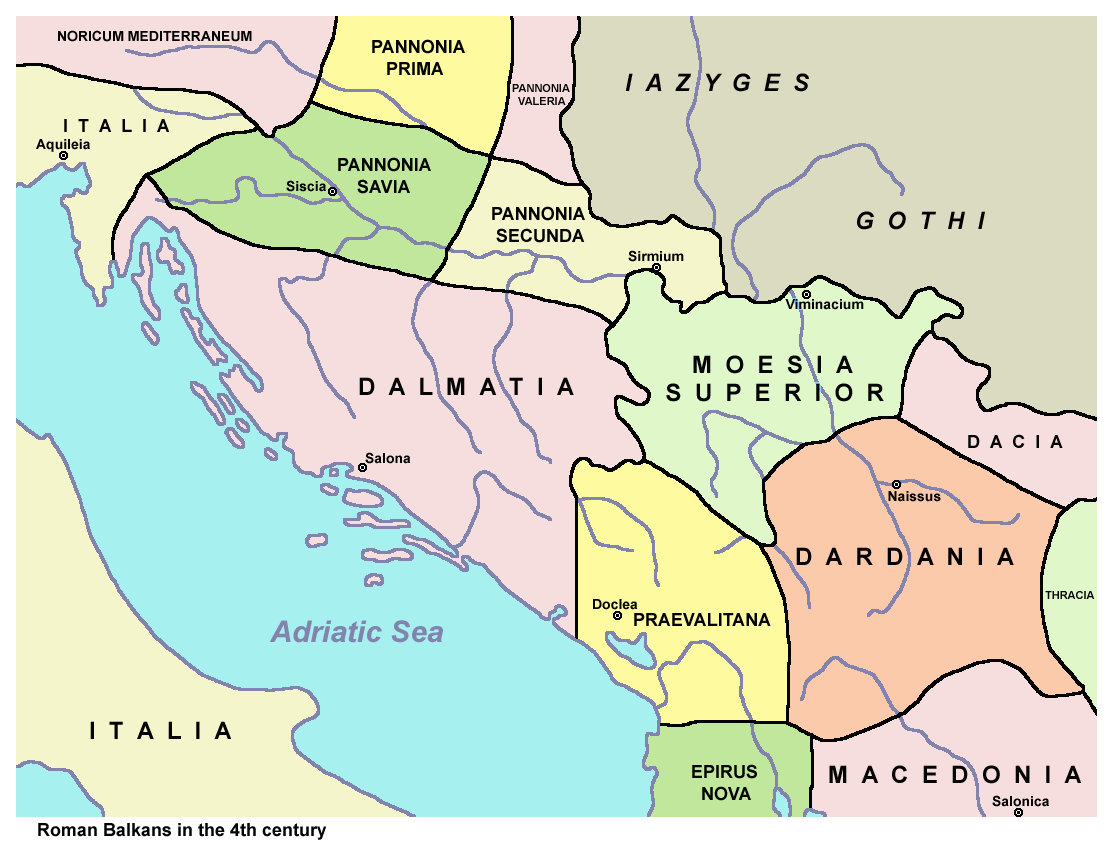
Dalmatia in the 4th century

In 337, when Constantine the Great died, the Roman Empire was partitioned among his sons. The empire was divided into three praetorian prefectures: the Galliae; Italia, Africa et Illyricum; and Oriens. The size of the provinces had been decreased and their number doubled by Diocletian. The provinces were also grouped in dioceses. Dalmatia became one of the seven provinces of the diocese of Pannonia. Initially, it was under the praetorian prefecture of Italy, Africa and Illyricum. It seems that the three dioceses of Macedonia, Dacia and Pannonia were first grouped together in a separate praetorian prefecture in 347 by Constans by removing them from the praetorian prefecture of Italy, Africa and Illyricum (which then became the praetorian prefecture of Italy and Africa) or that this praetorian prefecture was formed in 343 when Constans appointed a prefect for Italy.

== Romanization ==
German historian Theodor Mommsen wrote (in his The Provinces of the Roman Empire) that coastal Dalmatia and its islands were fully romanized and Latin-speaking by the 4th century.

The Croatian historian Aleksandar Stipčević writes that analysis of archaeological material from that period has shown that the process of romanization was rather selective. While urban centers, both coastal and inland, were almost completely romanized, the situation in the countryside was completely different. Despite the Illyrians being subject to a strong process of acculturation, they continued to speak their native language (Illyrian language), follow their own gods and traditions, and maintain their own social-political organization, which was adapted to Roman administration and political structure only in some necessities.

== Collapse ==
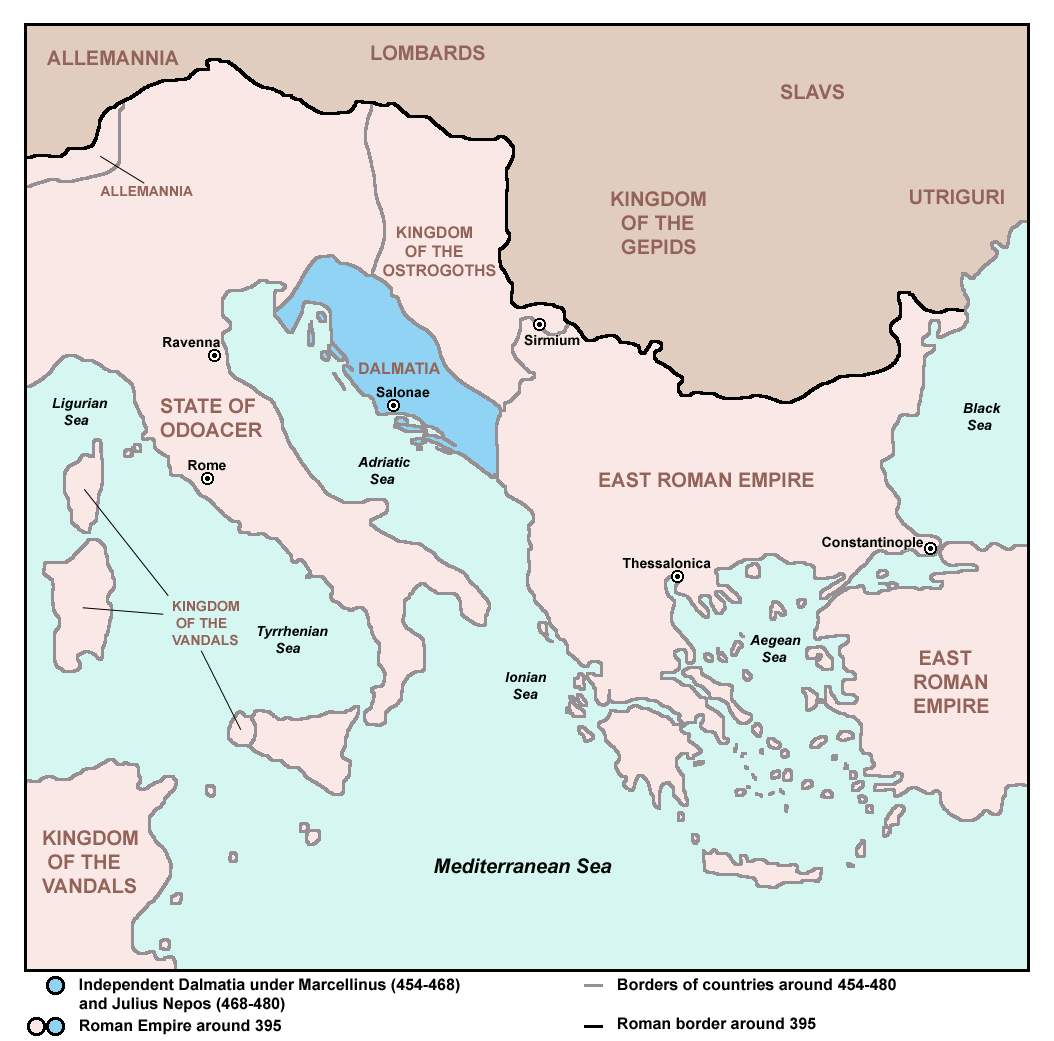
Independent Dalmatia - Extent of Marcellinus' Control (454–468), Julius Nepos' Control (468–480) and Ovida (480-481)

In 454 Marcellinus, a military commander in Dalmatia, rebelled against Valentinian III, the Roman emperor in the West. He seized control of Dalmatia and governed it independently until his death in 468. Julius Nepos became the governor of Dalmatia even though he was a relative of the emperor of the East, Leo I the Thracian, and Dalmatia was under the western part of the Roman empire. Dalmatia remained an autonomous area. In 474, Leo I elevated Nepos as emperor of the western part of the empire in order to depose Glycerius, a usurper emperor. Nepos deposed the usurper, but was in turn deposed in 475 by Orestes, who made his son Romulus Augustus emperor in the west. Leo I refused to recognize him and still held Julius Nepos as the emperor of the west. Romulus Augustus was deposed in 476 by Odoacer, who proclaimed himself king of Italy. Nepos remained in Dalmatia and continued to govern it until he was assassinated in 480. Ovida, a military commander, was in charge of Dalmatia thereafter. However, Odoacer used Nepos' murder as a pretext to invade Dalmatia, defeated Ovida and annexed Dalmatia to his kingdom of Italy. In 488 Zeno, the new emperor of the east, sent Theodoric the Great, the king of the Ostrogoths, to Italy so as to depose Odoacer. Zeno also wanted to get rid of the Ostrogoths, who were Roman allies and were settled in the eastern part of the empire, but were becoming restless and difficult to manage. Theodoric fought a four-year war in Italy, killed Odoacer, settled his people in Italy and established the Ostrogothic Kingdom there. Dalmatia and the rest of the former diocese of Pannonia came under the Ostrogothic Kingdom.

== List of governors of Dalmatia ==
- Publius Silius, son of Publius: between 19 and 16 BC
- Gaius Vibius Postumus: c.9 or 10 AD, first governor
- Marcus Servilius, son of Gaius, probably before 14 AD
- Publius Cornelius Dolabella: 14–20
- Lucius Volusius Saturninus: 20–37
- Lucius Arruntius Camillus Scribonianus: c. AD 41
- Gaius Calpetanus Rantius Sedatus: c. AD 48
- Aulus Ducenius Geminus: AD 67/68 or before
- Marcus Pompeius Silvanus Staberius Flavinus: 67/68—70
- Lucius Plotius Pegasus: 70/71–72/73
- Lucius Funisulanus Vettonianus: 79/80–81/82
- Gaius Cilnius Proculus: between 87 and 97
- Quintus Pomponius Rufus: 92/93–94/95
- Macer: 98/99–99/100
- Gaius Minicius Fundanus: after 107, probably 108/109–111/112
- Publius Coelius Balbinus Vibullius Pius: after 137
- Marcus Aemilius Papus: 147—150
- Titus Prifernius Paetus Rosianus Geminus: 153–156
- Sextus Aemilius Equester: 159–162
- Publius Julius Scapula Tertullus: 164–169
- Pollienus Auspex: c. 173–175
- Marcus Didius Iulianus: c. 175–177
- Gaius Vettius Sabinianus Julius Hospes: c. 177–178
- Gaius Arrius Antoninus: c. 178–179
- Lucius Aurelius Gallus: c. 179–182
- Lucius Junius Rufinus Proculianus: c. 182–184
- Marcus Cassius Apronianus: after 185
- Marcus Nummius Umbrius Primus Senecio Albinus: 212–214
- Gaius Avitus Alexianus: c. 214–216
- Lucius Cassius Dio Cocceianus: c. 223–225
- Gaius Fulvius Maximus: between 222 and 235
- Lucius Domitius Gallicanus Papinianus: c. 238

=== Independent rulers in the 5th century ===
- Marcellinus: 454–468
- Julius Nepos: 468–480
- Ovida: 480–481/482

== Bibliography ==
- Appian, the Foreign Wars, The Illyrian wars, Book 10, The Illyrian Wars; Loeb Classical Library, Vol II, Books 8.2-12, Harvard University Press, 1912; ISBN 978-0674990043
- Barnes, T., The New Empire of Diocletian and Constantine, Harvard University Press, 1982; ISBN 978-0674280663
- Barnes, T., Constantine: Dynasty, Religion and Power in the Later Roman Empire (Blackwell Ancient Lives), Wiley-Blackwell, reprint edition, 2013; ISBN 978-1118782750
- Cassius Dio, Roman History, Vol 6, Books 51-65 (Loeb Classical Library), Loeb, 1989; ISBN 978-0674990920
- MacGeorge, P., Late Roman Warlords. Oxford University Press, 2002; ISBN 0-19-925244-0.
- Gračanin, Hrvoje (2015). "Late Antique Dalmatia and Pannonia in Cassiodorus' Variae". Povijesni prilozi. 49: 9–80.
- Gračanin, Hrvoje (2016). "Late Antique Dalmatia and Pannonia in Cassiodorus' Variae (Addenda)". Povijesni prilozi. 50: 191–198.
- Notitia Dignitarum, BiblioLife, 2009; ISBN 978-1113370082
- Papazoglu, Fanula (1978). The Central Balkan Tribes in pre-Roman Times: Triballi, Autariatae, Dardanians, Scordisci and Moesians. Amsterdam: Hakkert. ISBN 9789025607937.
- Sanader, Mirjana (2009). Dalmatia. Eine römische Provinz an der Adria [Dalmatia. A Roman province on the Adriatic]. Mainz: Zabern, ISBN 978-3-8053-3955-1.
- Wozniak, Frank E. (1981). "East Rome, Ravenna and Western Illyricum: 454-536 A.D." Historia: Zeitschrift für Alte Geschichte. 30 (3): 351–382.

== Sources and external links ==
- Map
- Map
