= Consularia Italica =

The Consularia Italica are a collection of consular fasti published in 1892 by Theodore Mommsen as part of the 'Monumenta Germaniae Historica'. They are composed of:

1. Anonymi valesiani pars posterior
2. Fasti vindobonenses priores
3. Fasti vindobonenses posteriores
4. Paschale campanum
5. Continuatio hauniensis Prosperi
6. Excerpta ex Barbaro Scaligeri
7. Excerpta ex Agnelli Libro pontificali ecclesiae ravennati
