= Auctarium Prosperi Havniense =

Continuation of the Chronicle of Prosper of Aquitaine

The Auctarium Prosperi Havniense (or Continuatio Prosperi Havniensis) is an anonymous continuation of the Chronicle of Prosper of Aquitaine, embodied in a manuscript at Copenhagen (Latin: Havnia, hence Havniense); it was given this appellation by Theodor Mommsen. Written in Latin in Italy, it covers the periods 455–457 and 473–625. It is an important source for the early Lombard kingdom.

== Editions ==
- Hille, Georg, ed. (1866). Prosperi Aquitani Chronici continuator Havniensis (in Latin). Nunc primum edidit. Berolini: apud Weidmannos.
- Mommsen, Theodor, ed. (1892). Prosperi Continuatio Havniensis (in Latin). Monumenta Germaniae Historica. Auctores antiquissimi. Chronica minora saec. IV.V.VI.VII. Vol. 9/1. Berolini: apud Weidmannos. pp. 266–271 and pp. 298–339.
- Muhlberger, Steven, ed. (1984). "The Copenhagen Continuation of Prosper: A Translation". Florilegium. Vol. 6, pp. 71–95.
