= Fasti vindobonenses =

The Fasti vindobonenses are two sets of late antique consular annals ("fasti"), found in the Vindobonensis manuscript MS. 3416, together with the Chronography of 354. They were previously known as Anonymus Cuspiniani, since they were published by Johannes Cuspinianus in 1553, and are part of the Consularia Italica collection.

The first collection is entitled Fasti vindobonenses priores and covers the periods 44 BC – AD 403 and 455 – 493. The second is called Fasti vindobonenses posteriores and covers the period 44 BC – AD 397, 439 – 455 and 495 – 539.

Later additions were included for years 390 – 473 in a copy conserved in the Sangallensis MS. 878.

== See also ==
- List of ancient Roman fasti
