= Marcellinus Comes =

Byzantine chronicler

Marcellinus Comes (Greek: Μαρκελλίνος ό Κόμης, died c. 534) was a Latin chronicler of the Byzantine Empire. An Illyrian by birth, he spent most of his life at the court of Constantinople. His only surviving work, the Chronicle, focuses on the Byzantine Empire.

== Chronicle ==
Only one work of his survives, a chronicle (Annales), which was a continuation of Eusebius's Ecclesiastical History. It covers the period from 379 to 534, although an unknown writer added a continuation down to 566. Although his work is in Latin, it primarily describes the affairs of the Byzantine Empire. Some information about Western Europe, drawn from Orosius's Historia adversus paganos and Gennadius' De viris illustribus, is introduced insofar as it relates to Constantinople. The chronicle is filled with details and anecdotes about the city and the court. Marcellinus was an Orthodox and has little good to say about heretics in his work.

== Sources ==
- Herbermann, Charles, ed. (1913). "Marcellinus Comes" . Catholic Encyclopedia. New York: Robert Appleton Company.

== Literature ==
- The Chronicle of Marcellinus: a translation and commentary, by Brian Croke (translation/commentary) and Theodor Mommsen (edition). Sydney: Australian Association for Byzantine Studies, 1995.
- Count Marcellinus and His Chronicle by Brian Croke. Oxford: Oxford University Press, 2001.
- La Cronaca dei Due Imperi, Il Chronicon di Marcellino Comes (A.D. 379–534 & Auctarium). Introduzione, traduzione e note a cura di A. Palo. Testo latino a fronte. Il Saggio Editore 2021.

- Dagmar Bartonkova, Marcellinus Comes and Jordanes's Romana, SBORNlK PRACI FILOSOFICKE FAKULTY BRNENSKE UNIVERSITY, E 12, 1967, pp. 185-194.
- Brian Croke, Marcellinus on Dara: a Fragment of his lost De Temporum Qualitatibus et Positionibus Locorum, in Phoenix 38 1984, pp. 77-88.
- Massimo Gusso, A proposito dell'uso di «interrex» nel «Chronicon» di Marcellinus Comes, Critica Storica 28, 1, 1991, pp. 133-152.
- Massimo Gusso, Contributi allo studio della composizione e delle fonti del Chronicon di Marcellinus comes, Studia et Documenta Historiae e Iuris (Pontificia Università Lateranense), 61, 1995, pp. 557-622.
- Massimo Gusso, Index Marcellinianus: an index to the Chronicon of Marcellinus Comes, Olms-Weidmann, Hildesheim 1996, pp. xiii, 171 (Konkordanzen zur klassischen Philologie, nr. 183).
- Massimo Gusso, Il Chronicon di Marcellinus Comes: a proposito di un libro recente, Cassiodorus, 3 (1997), pp. 273–289 (about: Brian Croke, The Chronicle of Marcellinus, Translation and Commentary, with a Reproduction of Mommsen's Edition of the Text, Australian Association for Byzantine Studies (Byzantina Australiensia 7), Sydney 1995, pp. xxvii-152).
- Massimo Gusso, La «caduta» dell’Impero Romano nella percezione dei contemporanei, Circolo Vittoriese di Ricerche Storiche, Quaderno n. 7, 2002, pp. 31-49.
- Massimo Gusso, Orientale tantum secutum imperium, Rivista di cultura classica e medioevale, 66, 1, 2004, pp. 121–137 (about: Brian Croke, Count Marcellinus and his Chronicle, Oxford University Press, Oxford 2001).
- Theodore Nagy, The Reoccupation of Pannonia from the Huns in 427 (Did Jordanes use the Chronicon of Marcellinus Comes at the writing of the Getica?), Acta Antiqua. Academiae Scientiarum Hungaricae, 15 (1967), pp. 159-186.
- László Várady, Jordanes Studien. Jordanes und das "Chronicon" des Marcellinus Comes. Die Selbständigkeit des Jordanes, in Chiron 1976, pp. 441-487.
