= Battle by the Anastasian Wall (559) =

Anastasian Wall Battle
- Part of Byzantine-Kutrigurs war 558–559
Date	Early 559
Location	East of the Anastasian Wall 40 km west of Constantinople
Result	Kutrigur victory

Belligerents
Byzantine Empire	Kutrigur Bulgars army

Commanders and leaders
Sergius (executed)	Zabergan

Strength
15 000	7,000

Casualties and losses
All sent troops killed	Unknown

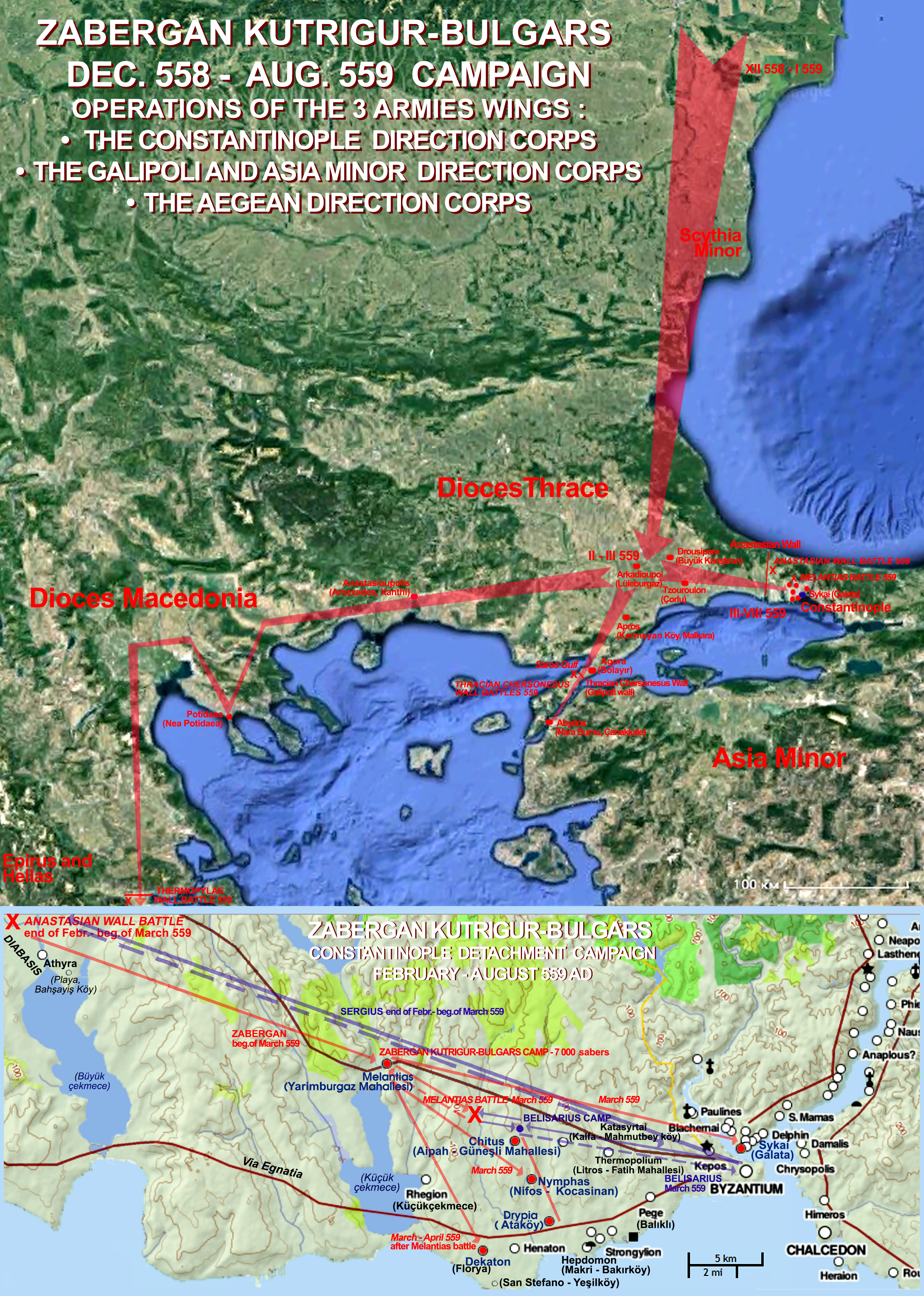
Kutrigur-Byzantine War Dec 558 - Aug 559, with Kutrigur campaigns against Constantinople, against Thracian Chersonesus and around the Aegean.

The Anastasian Wall Battle or Battle at the Anastasian Wall, which took place at the end of winter – beginning of spring 559, was a pivotal battle between the Byzantine army commanded by Dux Sergius and a Kutrigur Bulgars army commanded by Zabergan in the 558-559 AD Kutrigur campaign against the Byzantine Empire. The battle took place at the east side of the Anastasian Wall, about 40 km west of Constantinople.

== Background ==
During the winter of 558, a Kutrigur army crossed the frozen Danube and invaded Moesia and Thrace. It then split into three, heading towards Constantinople, Thracian Chersonesus and Thermopylae. Zabergan, leading a group of 7000 cavalry, crossed the Anastasian wall at the beginning of spring 559.

== The Battle ==
A Byzantine force sent by emperor Justinian and made up of the Imperial Guard, regular troops and mobilized citizens clashed with the Kutrigur cavalry at the east side of the Anastasian Wall but were defeated. During the battle, Patricius Sergius was captured; Zabergan had him executed.

== Aftermath ==
After this victory, Constantinople became under threat, with Kutrigur forces overrunning settlements on the outskirts of the city during the spring of 559. Drypia, Nymphs (Nymphas) and Hitos (Chitus) were captured and the Kutrigurs briefly entered Sykai. The Kutrigur force at this moment stood about 15 km from the Gate of St. Roman, with Zabergan making his fortified camp at Melantias, just 20 km of Constantinople. The panicked Roman population took shelter behind the Walls of Constantinople.

Belisarius, recalled from retirement by Justinian, then led a force of 300 veterans and took camp just a few kilometers from the Kutrigurs in Melantias. Zabergan attempted to take the Byzantines by surprise, but was in turn taken by surprise and defeated at the Battle of Melantias.

With the Byzantine victory, the threat for the capital was removed. The Kutrigur army withdrew from Constantintople, plundering Decatum and Thrace before re-crossing the Danube and returning to their homeland. Subsequently, Emperor Justinian I (r. 527–565) managed to persuade the Utigur chieftain Sandilch to attack the Kutrigurs, which resulted in the decimation of both of them.
