= Kazarig =

Dynasty of rulers in Arabia

Kazarig (Aramaic: ܟܙܪܝܓ), was the name of a dynasty of rulers in the Land of Kedar (Arabia). The first Khazarig was, according to Sandilch, a son of Ernakh, after whom the Kutrigurs were named. Ernakh's other son was Utig after whom Sandilch's own Utigurs were named.

Perhaps unrelated, Kozar, the name of a Khazar ancestor in the Khazar correspondence, could mean "Goat-Herder" in Slavonic languages.

== Bar Hebraeus ==
According to Bar Hebraeus and the Chronicle of Michael the Syrian, the name Kazarig was later adopted by one of three brothers (the others being Bulgarios and Drogo) who came from the Imaon mountains to rule Hunnish tribes in the East European grasslands in 583. Kotzarig's subjects became known as Khazars. His brother Bulgarios with 10,000 men acquired Dacia from Maurice (emperor) (582-602). The fate of the third brother is not mentioned.

There is a frequently drawn parallel between these three brothers and the three brothers Shchek, Khoryv (Carpathia) and Kyi (who founded Kyiv in the 6th century) to whom the Khazars are said to be related.

=== Interpretation ===
The first Kazarig was the son of Ernakh whose Onogurs relocated in 463 seizing the lands of the Akatziroi after whom he named his son Kazarig. The report of Bar Hebraeus then refers mainly to events during Zabergan's rule of the Kutrigurs immediately following Sinnion and the dominance of the Avar conqueror Kandik. The Eurasian Avars arrived in 557. Tiberius II Constantine was acting for Justin at the time. The acquisition of Dacia was not immediate but was part of Maurice's Balkan campaigns where Zabergan was recruited into Empire service. Bulgarios should be identified with Sandilch and Kazarig with Zabergan taking their names from the tribes they ruled in the Sarmatian Steppe.

== Legacy ==
The name is later given by Nikephoros I of Constantinople to one of the "sons" of Khagan Kubrat who, following a dispute with his brother Batbayan, established his rule in Bolghar.

== See also ==
- Kazarigs
- Kutrigurs
- Khinialon
- List of Hunnic rulers
- Khazars
- Kotrag
