= Khazar language =

Extinct Turkic language spoken by Khazars

Khazar
- The 10th century Kievian Letter has the Orkhon inscription word-phrase OKHQURÜM, "I read (this or it)".
- Native to: Khazar Khanate
- Ethnicity: Khazars
- Extinct: by the 13th century
- Language family: Turkic: (classification disputed); Khazar
- Writing system: Old Turkic

Language codes
- ISO 639-3: zkz
- Glottolog: None

Khazar, also known as Khazaric, was a Turkic dialect group spoken by the Khazars, a group of semi-nomadic Turkic peoples originating from Central Asia. There are few written records of the language and its features and characteristics are unknown. It is believed to have gradually become extinct by the 13th century AD as its speakers assimilated into neighboring Turkic-speaking populations.

As the extant corpus of Khazar is extremely limited, consisting of two nouns, a conjugated verb, and a few proper names, its exact genealogical position within the Turkic language family remains unresolved. Some scholars believe that it belongs to the Oghuric branch of the Turkic language family, while others place it in the Common Turkic branch.

== Classification ==
There are many problems with exact classification of the Khazar language. One of the basic issues is the vague nature of the name Khazar itself. It has not yet been determined whether it refers to a specific Turkic tribe, or if it had a political and geographical origin that was not ethnolinguistic. The Khazar realm was a multilingual and multicultural state, with speakers of Iranian, Finno-Ugric, Slavic, and North Caucasian languages among its inhabitants. The Turkic tribes probably spoke a number of Turkic languages. Scholars considered possible that the term Khazar denoted one or even several languages; however, the extent to which an "official" Khazar language was used in the Khazar state is unknown.

Contemporary accounts are unclear on Khazar's linguistic affiliation. The tenth-century traveler and geographer al-Istakhri wrote two conflicting notices: "the language of the Khazars is different than the language of the Turks and the Persians, nor does a tongue of (any) group of humanity have anything in common with it, and the language of the Bulgars is like the language of the Khazars but the Burtas have another language." Al-Istakhri mentioned that the population of Darband spoke Khazar along with other languages of their mountains. Al-Masudi (896 – 956) listed the Khazars among the types of Turks and noted that they are called Sabir in Turkic and Xazar in Persian. Al-Biruni (973 – 1050), while discussing the Volga Bulgars and Sawars (Sabirs), noted their language was a "mixture of Turkic and Khazar." Al-Muqaddasi (c. 945/946 – 991) described the Khazar language as "very incomprehensible." Ibn Hawqal, who travelled during the years 943 to 969 AD, wrote that "the Bulgar language resembles that of the Khazars".

Historian Peter B. Golden writes: "It is probable that even if 'Khazar' (or one of Khazaria's principal languages) did belong to some branch of Oğuro-Bulğaric, it was sufficiently different that people distinguished between the two." He contrasts this with the relative uniformity of Common Turkic, of which al-Istakhri wrote, "as for the Turks, all of them, from the Toquz Oğuz, Qırğız, Kimek, Oğuz, Qarluq, their language is one. They understand one another".

== Vocabulary ==
The linguistic data on Khazar consists mostly of proper names such as titles (Beg, Bolušči, Ishad, Il-teber/El-teber, Qağan, Kündü Qağan, Jâwšîġr, Tarxan, Tudun, Yabgu, Yilig/Yelig), anthroponyms (Itaq), and toponyms (Sarkel/Šarkil, Sarığšın/Sarığčın), mostly of Turkic origin. The interpretations do not indicate whether these are Common Turkic or Oghuric.

Just two common nouns have been attested. The Arab historian Ibn A'tham al-Kufi records the name of a type of tent as alǰdāḏ, whose first part is probably a cognate of eastern Old Turkic alaču 'tent'. A word for 'funeral feast' is recorded by the Byzantine historian Theophanes in several forms: δοχήν dokhḗn, δογήν dogḗn, δογῆν dogên, δουγήν dougén, comparable with eastern Old Turkic yog (as well as with a term recorded by Menandros as δογια dogia). Other nouns have been proposed to be reflected in Khazar proper names, such as *bulan 'elk', *ït 'dog' in the personal names Bulan and Itakh.

Khazar was stated by the 1986 Guinness Book of Records (following a claim by the Great Soviet Encyclopedia) to have the "smallest literature" of any language, allegedly comprising only one attested word, oqurüm, "I have read" (from the Kievan Letter).

== See also ==
- Alsószentmihály inscription

== Notes ==
Sources

- Erdal, Marcel (2007). "The Khazar Language". In Golden, Peter B.; Ben-Shammai, Haggai; Róna-Tas, András (eds.). The World of the Khazars: New Perspectives. Handbuch der Orientalistik: Handbook of Uralic studies. Vol. 17. BRILL. pp. 75–108. ISBN 978-90-04-16042-2.
- Golden, Peter Benjamin (1992). An introduction to the History of the Turkic peoples: ethnogenesis and state formation in medieval and early modern Eurasia and the Middle East. Wiesbaden: Otto Harrassowitz. ISBN 9783447032742.
- Golden, Peter B. (2011). Studies on the Peoples and Cultures of the Eurasian Steppes. Editura Academiei Române; Editura Istros a Muzeului Brăilei. ISBN 9789732721520.
