= Tyranx =

Tyranx (died 528) was a Hun general and sub-king, or king of a Hunnish tribe, fighting for the Sasanian Empire.

== Biography ==
He was a king of a section of the Huns. In the late 520s, he became an ally of Persian king Kavad I. He fought for him against the queen of fellow Hunnish tribe Sabirs, a woman named Boa (Boarez/Boarek), the widow of Balaq. As he was marching with fellow Hun king Glom to the aid of the Persians, who were fighting the Romans, he was defeated by Boa, captured, and sent in chains to Justinian, who executed him near the Church of St. Conon, located in the Blachernae on the bank of the Golden Horn.

== Etymology ==
His name is thought to be of Turkic origin.

== Sources ==
- Maenchen-Helfen, Otto John (1973), The World of the Huns: Studies in Their History and Culture, University of California Press, ISBN 9780520015968
- Agathias (1975), The Histories, Walter de Gruyter, ISBN 978-3-11-082694-4
- Clauson, Gerard (1972). An Etymological Dictionary of Pre-Thirteenth-Century Turkish. Oxford: Clarendon Press.
- Golden, Peter Benjamin (1980). Khazar studies: An Historico-Philological Inquiry into the Origins of the Khazars. Vol. 1. Budapest: Akadémiai Kiadó. ISBN 9630515490.
- Sinor, Denis (1990), The Cambridge History of Early Inner Asia, Cambridge University Press, ISBN 978-0-521-24304-9
- Golden, Peter Benjamin (1992). An introduction to the History of the Turkic peoples: ethnogenesis and state formation in medieval and early modern Eurasia and the Middle East. Wiesbaden: Otto Harrassowitz. ISBN 9783447032742.
- Golden, Peter Benjamin (2013). "Some Notes on the Etymology of Sabirs". In Alexander A. Sinitsyn; Maxim M. Kholod (eds.). Κοινον Δωρον - Studies and Essays in Honour of Valery P. Nikonorov on the Occasion of His Sixtieth Birthday presented by His Friends and Colleagues. St. Petersburg State University - Faculty of Philology. pp. 49–55.
- Greatrex, Geoffrey; Lieu, Samuel N. C. (2007), The Roman Eastern Frontier and the Persian Wars Ad 363-628, Psychology Press, ISBN 978-0-415-46530-4
- Golden, Peter B. (2011). Studies on the Peoples and Cultures of the Eurasian Steppes. Editura Academiei Române; Editura Istros a Muzeului Brăilei. ISBN 9789732721520.
- Boris Zhivkov (2015). Khazaria in the Ninth and Tenth Centuries. Brill. ISBN 9789004294486.
- Zimonyi, Istvan (2015), Muslim Sources on the Magyars in the Second Half of the 9th Century: The Magyar Chapter of the Jayhānī Tradition, BRILL, ISBN 978-90-04-30611-0
