= Oghur =

Oghur may refer to:

- an early Turkic word for "tribe", see Turkic tribal confederations and Oğurs
- the Turkic Oghur languages
- Yugra
