= Onogurs =

5th–7th-century Turkic nomadic group of the Pontic–Caspian steppe

The Onoghurs, Onoğurs, or Oğurs (Ὀνόγουροι, Οὔρωγοι, Οὔγωροι; Onογurs, Ογurs; "ten tribes", "tribes") were a group of Turkic nomadic equestrians who flourished in the Pontic–Caspian steppe and the Volga region between the 5th and 7th centuries, and spoke an Oghuric language.

== Etymology ==
The name Onoğur is widely thought to derive from On-Oğur "ten Oğurs (tribes)". Modern scholars consider Turkic terms for tribe oğuz and oğur to be derived from Turkic *og/uq, meaning "kinship or being akin to". The terms initially were not the same, as oq/ogsiz meant "arrow", while oğul meant "offspring, child, son", oğuš/uğuš was "tribe, clan", and the verb oğša-/oqša meant "to be like, resemble". The modern name of "Hungary" (see name of Hungary) is usually believed to be derived from On-Oğur (> (H)Ungari).

According to another hypothesis and Turkological research (of Radlov, 1893; Ramsstedt, 1909; Abaev, 1958; Baskakov, 1969;), the word Ogur originates from the name of the main totemic animal — the bull, ox (hōğur). Turkic‑Mongolian tribes frequently used clan totems derived from birds and animals, such as the crane, nightingale, swallow, wolf, leopard, snake, lizard, etc. It is argued that among the Ogur and Oghuz tribes, the bull (ox) served as a symbol because these animals were used as a labour force and represented physical strength and endurance. The words ogur and oghuz are phonetic variants of a single Proto‑Turkic lexeme meaning "bull, ox". The difference between the forms is due to rhotacism — a phonetic process in which the sound [z] in Oguric (Bulgaric) languages is replaced by [r]: oguz → ogur (öküz → ökör), and as a loanword in Hungarian, Chuvash, Mongolian and other languages.

According to Greek historical accounts, Uti and Kotrag were blood brothers. Procopius of Caesarea recounts:

In ancient times, many Huns (hunnu), then called Cimmerians, inhabited the lands I have already mentioned. They all had one king. Once, one of their kings had two sons: one was named Utigor, and the other was named Kotrigor. After their father’s death, they divided power and gave their names to the subjugated peoples, so that even today some are called Utigurs and others are called Kutrigurs.

They occupied the Tanais‑Meotian (Don‑Azov) steppe zone, with the Kutrigurs in the western part and the Otrigors in the east. This account is also confirmed by the words of the Utigur ruler Sandilch:

It is unjust and improper to exterminate our fellow tribesmen (the Kutrigurs), who not only speak a language identical to ours, are our neighbours, and have the same clothing and way of life, but are also our relatives — albeit subject to other rulers.

== Language ==
The Onoghuric or Oghuric languages are a branch of the Turkic languages. Some scholars suggest Hunnic had strong ties with Bulgar and to modern Chuvash and refer to this extended Oghuric grouping as separate Hunno-Bulgar languages. However, such speculations are not based on proper linguistic evidence, since the language of the Huns is almost unknown except for a few attested words and personal names. Scholars generally consider Hunnish as unclassifiable.

The Chuvash language is agglutinative in the structure of grammar, phonetically it is synharmonic. Some scholars consider the Chuvash as the sole living representative of Volga Bulgar language. while others support the idea that Chuvash is another distinct Oghur Turkic language. Chuvash is sometimes considered to share a linguistic connection with the Khazar language although the classification of Khazar language debated among scholars. Chuvash has two to three dialects. Chuvash language is agglutinative in the structure of grammar, phonetically it is synharmonic. In this respect, it's almost no different from other Turkic languages. Oghuric family is distinguished from the rest of the Turkic family by sound changes and it has a special place.

The Oghuric languages are also known as "-r Turkic" because the final consonant in certain words is r, not z as in Common Turkic. Chuvash: вăкăр - Turkish: öküz - Tatar: үгез - English: ox. Hence the name Oghur corresponds to Oghuz "tribe" in Common Turkic. Other correspondences are Com. š : Oghur l (tâš : tâl, 'stone'); s > š; *č > ś; k/q > ğ; y > j, ś; d, δ > δ > z (10th cent.) > r (13th cent.)"; ğd > z > r (14th cent.); a > ı (after 9th cent.). The shift from s to š operates before i, ï, and iV, and Vladimir Dybo calls the sound change the "Bulgar palatalization".

Denis Sinor believed that the differences noted above suggest that the Oghur-speaking tribes could not have originated in territories inhabited by speakers of Mongolic languages, given that Mongolian dialects feature the -z suffix. Peter Golden, however, has noted that there are many loanwords in Mongolic from Oghuric, such as Mongolic ikere, Oghuric *ikir, Hungarian iker, Common Turkic *ikiz 'twins', and holds the contradictory view that the Oghur inhabited the borderlands of Mongolia before the 5th century.

The Oghuric tribes are also connected with the Hungarians, whose exo-ethnonym is usually believed to be derived from On-Oğur (> (H)Ungari). Hungarians -> Hun Oghur -> (ten oghur tribes): On ogur -> up.chv. Won ogur -> dow.chv. Wun ogur -> belor. Wugorac -> rus. Wenger -> slove. Vogr, Vogrin -> cheh. pol. Węgier, Węgrzyn, -> lit. Veñgras. The Hungarians are culturally of mixed Ugrian / Turkic heritage, with Oghuric-Bulgar and Khazar influences, even though much of the modern-day Hungarian gene pool also has strong Slavic, Germanic, and Iranic influences. Hungarian has many borrowings from Common Turkic and Oghuric languages:

Hung. tenger, Oghur. *tengir, Comm. *tengiz 'sea', Hung. gyűrű, Oghur. *ǰürük, Comm. *yüzük 'ring', and terms of equestrian culture ló 'horse', nyereg 'saddle', fék 'bridle', ostor 'whip'. A number of Hungarian loanwords were borrowed before the 9th century, shown by sz- (< Oğ. *ś-) rather than gy- (< Oğ. *ǰ-), for example Hung. szél, Oghur. *śäl, Chuv. śil, Comm. *yel 'wind', Hung. szűcs 'tailor', Hung. szőlő 'grapes'.

In the Oghuz languages as azer. tur. öküz means ox (totemic animal), and is a reflection of the Chuvash language wăkăr where rhotacism is used, in the Kipchak languages it is ögiz.

== History ==
The Onogurs were one of the first Oghuric Turkic tribes that entered the Ponto-Caspian steppes as the result of migrations set off in Inner Asia. The 10th century Movses Kaghankatvatsi recorded, considered late 4th century, certain Honagur, "a Hun (Note: The ethnonym of the Huns, like those of Scythians and Türks, became a generic term for steppe-people (nomads) and invading enemies from the East, no matter of their actual origin and identity.) from the Honk" who raided Persia, which were related to the Onoghurs, and located near Transcaucasia and the Sassanian Empire. Scholars also relate the Hyōn to this account.

According to Priscus, in 463 the representatives of Ernak's Saraghurs (Oghur. sara, "White Oghurs"), Oghurs and Onoghurs came to the Emperor in Constantinople, and explained they had been driven out of their homeland by the Sabirs, who had been attacked by the Avars in Inner Asia. This tangle of events indicates that the Oghuric tribes are related to the Ting-ling and Tiele people. It is considered they belonged to the westernmost Tiele tribes, which also included the Uyghurs-Toquz Oghuz and the Oghuz Turks, and were initially located in Western Siberia and Kazakhstan. Leo I the Thracian granted Ernak the lands of the treacherous Karadach's Akatziroi roughly corresponding to 20th century Ukraine. Later kings of the Onogur Huns included Grod, Mugel and Sandilch, whose Utigurs were engaged in a civil war against the Kutrigurs of Khinialon.

The origin of the Kutrigurs and Utigurs, who lived in the vicinity of the Onoghurs and Bulgars, and their mutual relationship, is considered obscure. Scholars are unsure how the union between Onoghurs and Bulgars formed, imagining it as a long process in which a number of different groups merged. During that time, the Bulgars may have represented a large confederation of which the Onoghurs formed one of the core tribes, together with the remnants of the Utigurs and Kutrigurs, among others.

Jordanes in Getica (551) mentioned that the Hunuguri (believed to be the Onoghurs) were notable for the marten skin trade. In the Middle Ages, marten skin was used as a substitute for minted money. This also indicates they lived near forests and were in contact with Finno-Ugrian peoples.

The Syriac translation of the Pseudo-Zacharias Rhetor's Ecclesiastical History (c. 555) in Western Eurasia records the Avnagur (Aunagur; considered Onoghurs), wngwr (Onoğur), wgr (Oghur). The author wrote: "Avnagur (Aunagur) are people, who live in tents. Avgar, sabir, burgar, alan, kurtargar, avar, hasar, dirmar, sirurgur, bagrasir, kulas, abdel and hephtalit are thirteen peoples, who live in tents, earn their living on the meat of livestock and fish, of wild animals and by their weapons (plunder)". About the Bulgars and Alans, during the first half of 6th century, he added: "The land Bazgun ... extends up to the Caspian Gates and to the sea, which are in the Hunnish lands. Beyond the gates live the Burgars (Bulgars), who have their language, and are people pagan and barbarian. They have towns. And the Alans - they have five towns."

The Onoghurs (Oghurs), in the 6th and 7th century sources, were mentioned mostly in connection with the Avar and Göktürk conquest of Western Eurasia. According to the 6th century Menander Protector, the "leader of the Οὐγούρων" had the authority of the Turk Yabgu Khagan in the region of Kuban River to the lower Don.

In early 7th century Theophylaktos Simokattes recorded that certain Onoghur city Βακάθ was destroyed by an earthquake before his lifetime. The Sogdian name indicates it was situated in the vicinity of Iranian Central Asia.

Simokattes in the Letter of the Turk Qaγan (Tamgan) to the Emperor Maurikios recorded a complex notice:

... the Qaghan set off on another undertaking and subjugated all the Ὀγώρ. This people is (one) of the most powerful because of their numbers and their training for war in full battle-gear. They have made their abodes towards the East, whence flows the river Τίλ, which the Turks have the custom of calling the "Black". The oldest chieftains of this people are called Οὐάρ and Χουννί.

According to the Qaghan, part of those Ouar (Uar) and Khounni (Huns) who arrived to Eastern Europe were mistook by the Onoghurs, Barsils, Sabirs and other tribes for the original Avars, and as such the Uar and Huns took advantage of the situation and began call themselves Avars. Simokattes also recounts "when the Ogor, then, were brought completely to heel, the Qaγan gave over the chief of the Κὸλχ (Kolx) to the bite of the sword", shows Oghurs resistance toward Turkic authority. Scholars consider if the Til is Qara Itil (Black Itil) i.e. Volga (Atil/Itil), then the mentioned Ὀγώρ would be the Oghurs, while if it is in Inner Asia, then it could be the Uyghurs.

=== Avar Khaganate ===
By 568 the Avars, under Khagan Bayan I established an empire in the Carpathian Basin that lasted for 250 years. Related peoples from the east arrived in the Avar Kaganate several times: around 595 the Kutrigurs, and then around 670 the Onoghurs. The Avar Khaganate collapsed after c. 822, a few decades later, Álmos and his son Árpád conquered the Carpathian Basin around c. 862–895. The Hungarian conquerors together with the Turkic-speaking Kabars integrated the Avars and Onoghurs.

=== Old Bulgaria ===
Kubrat organised the Onogurs under his Empire of Old Great Bulgaria in the Mid 7th century. From the 8th century, the Byzantine sources often mention the Onoghurs in close connection with the Bulgars. Agathon (early 8th century) wrote about the nation of Onoghur Bulgars. Nikephoros I (early 9th century) noted that Kubrat was the lord of the Onoghundurs; his contemporary Theophanes referred to them as Onoghundur–Bulgars. Kubrat successfully revolted against the Avars and founded the Old Great Bulgaria (Magna Bulgaria), also known as Onoghundur–Bulgars state, or Patria Onoguria in the Ravenna Cosmography. Constantine VII (mid-10th century) remarked that the Bulgars formerly called themselves Onogundurs.

This association was previously mirrored in Armenian sources, such as the Ashkharatsuyts, which refers to the Olxontor Błkar, and the 5th century History by Movses Khorenatsi, which includes an additional comment from a 9th-century writer about the colony of the Vłĕndur Bułkar. Marquart and Golden connected these forms with the Iġndr (*Uluġundur) of Ibn al-Kalbi (c. 820), the Vnndur (*Wunundur) of Hudud al-'Alam (982), the Wlndr (*Wulundur) of Al-Masudi (10th century) and Hungarian name for Belgrad Nándorfehérvár, the nndr (*Nandur) of Gardīzī (11th century) and *Wununtur in the letter by the Khazar King Joseph. All the forms show the phonetic changes typical of late Oghuric (prothetic w-; o- > wo-, u-, *wu-).

=== Volga Bulgaria ===
Onoghur-Bulgars who settled on the Volga river in the 7th century AD and converted to Islam in 922 during the missionary work of Ahmad ibn Fadlan, inhabited the present-day territory of Tatarstan. After the Batu Khan invasions of 1223–1236, the Golden Horde annexed Volga Bulgaria. Most of the population survived, and a certain degree of mixing between it and the Kipchaks of the Horde ensued. Onoghur-Bulgar group as a whole accepted the exonym "Tatars".

== See also ==
- Bulgars
- Kutrigurs
- Utigurs
- Chuvash people
- Khazars
- Extinct Turkic peoples
- Turkic tribal confederations
- Onogur Islands
