= Battle of Melantias =

Battle of the Byzantine-Kutrigurs War

Battle of Melanthius
- Part of the Byzantine-Kutrigur War of 558–559
Date	March 559
Location	Melantias, 20 mi (32 km) west of Constantinople
Result	Byzantine victory

Belligerents
Byzantine Empire	Kutrigurs

Commanders and leaders
Belisarius	Zabergan

Strength
300 Byzantine veteran troops and some civilians	2,000 cavalry

Casualties and losses
	400 killed

The Battle of Melantias or Battle of Melanthius (Greek: Μάχη τής Μελαντιάδος), which took place in 559, was fought between the armies of the Kutrigur Huns, commanded by Zabergan, and the Byzantine Empire, under the command of general Belisarius.

In March 559, Zabergan led the Kutrigurs across the frozen Danube River, invading and plundering Thrace and advancing to within 20 mi (32 km) of Constantinople. Justinian recalled Belisarius from retirement, who assembled a small force of soldiers, civilians and farmers. He prepared a defensive position near the capital and sent scouts to report on the Kutrigurs. When 2,000 Kutrigur cavalry attacked, Belisarius ambushed them in a narrow area. At the same time, Belisarius employed stratagems to give the impression of a larger Byzantine army. The Kutrigur cavalry fell into confusion and, after losing four hundred men, retreated.

While Belisarius sought to pursue, Justinian recalled him to Constantinople, where the victory made him popular with the people. The Kutrigurs eventually withdrew across the Danube River. Justinian ransomed the captives from the raids and encouraged the rival Utigurs to attack them.

== Background ==
In the late 540s and early 550s, military pressure on the Balkans intensified as Slavic groups north of the Danube River formed larger confederations that could challenge Byzantine frontier control and raid deeper into imperial territory. Emperor Justinian responded by strengthening defenses, but this strategy became increasingly ineffective against these larger forces. Combined with continued Hunnic raids and threats from the Lombards and Gepids, this strategy exposed the limits of Byzantine control of the Balkan region.

In March 559, the chieftain Zabergan led a Kutrigur army across the frozen Danube River and through the Byzantine fortifications. This army invaded Thrace, plundering the countryside. In Thrace, Zabergan divided his forces into three armies. One was sent into Greece to ravage the undefended countryside, while a second invaded the Thracian Chersonese. The third, comprising approximately 7,000 cavalrymen and commanded by Zabergan, advanced toward Constantinople. The Kutrigurs breached the earthquake-damaged Anastasian Wall and established their camp at Melantias on the river Athyras, 20 mi (32 km) west of Constantinople. The army's proximity to the capital caused fear and confusion among the populace. Justinian ordered the transfer of Church treasures across the Bosphorus to prevent them from falling into the hands of the raiders.

The Byzantine emperor Justinian I recalled Belisarius from retirement. Despite his age and the limited forces at his disposal, Belisarius accepted the command. He had three hundred experienced soldiers, while the remainder of his force consisted of civilians from Constantinople and farmers from the surrounding countryside, most of whom had little or no military experience and were poorly armed. Belisarius gathered whatever horses could be found in the area and equipped the men as best he could.

After assembling his forces, he established a camp near Constantinople, at the village of Chettus, and ordered a broad ditch to be dug around it. At the same time, scouts were sent out to observe the Kutrigurs and report on their movements and numbers. During these reconnaissance operations, the Byzantines captured and killed several Kutrigurs. During the night, he ordered numerous fires to be lit across the surrounding plain to conceal his army's numerical disadvantage. His men, encouraged by these preparations and their early successes, grew confident, but Belisarius warned them not to underestimate the Kutrigurs.

== Battle ==
Zabergan wanted to take the Byzantines by surprise. He sent about 2,000 cavalry to attack the Byzantine position. Belisarius was alerted by his scouts and prepared an ambush. He positioned his men in a narrow area where the Huns' superior numbers would be nullified. Upon encountering the Byzantines, the horsemen began to close in on the limited front of veterans, but hidden slingers and javelin men from the flanks attacked them. This caused the riders' ranks to close and become entangled in a mass, and about 400 were killed. At this point, according to the Byzantine historian Agathias, Belisarius used a stratagem to make the Kutrigurs believe that they were facing a sizeable force; he asked local peasants to scatter in the forest and hit the trees to make a lot of dust to scare the Kutrigur horses. The Kutrigurs panicked and retreated. Belisarius then withdrew his forces. He apparently wished to continue the pursuit but Justinian ordered him back to Constantinople. The recall was reportedly against his wishes, but his victory had already made him popular with the people of the capital. Belisarius's popularity irked those in high places, and no recognition was given for the victory.

== Aftermath ==
Defeated, the Kutrigurs retreated, plundered Thrace, and crossed the Danube River to return to their homeland. Justinian paid a ransom for the captives taken by the Kutrigurs. He then wrote to Sandichl, king of the rival Utigur Huns, informing him that the Kutrigurs had acquired a considerable amount of wealth that rightfully belonged to him. Justinian further threatened that if Sandichl hesitated, he would then transfer his amity to the Kutrigurs; Sandichl obliged, leading to extensive hostilities between the Utigurs and Kutrigurs.

== Sources ==
- Agathias (1975). Agathias: The Histories. Translated by Frendo, Joseph D. Berlin and New York: Walter de Gruyter. ISBN 3-11-003357-7.
- Baker, George P. (2002). Justinian: The Last Roman Emperor. New York: Cooper Square Press. ISBN 0-8154-1217-7.
- Bury, John Bagnell (1958) [1923]. History of the Later Roman Empire: From the Death of Theodosius I to the Death of Justinian. Vol. 2. Mineola, New York: Dover Publications, Inc. OCLC 606071669.
- Crow, James (2025). "From Long Walls to the Great Fence: The Loss of the Balkans and the Establishment of New Frontiers in the North". HiMA: revue internationale d'Histoire Militaire Ancienne. 14: 243–262. doi:10.58335/hima.2405.
- Martindale, John R. (1992). The Prosopography of the Later Roman Empire 2 Part Set: Volume 3, AD 527–641. Cambridge: Cambridge University Press. ISBN 978-0-521-20160-5. OCLC 614787910.
- Sarris, Peter (2023). Justinian Emperor, Soldier, Saint. New York: Basic Books. ISBN 978-1-529-36541-2.
