= Bulgarios =

Bulgarios may refer to:

- brother of Kozar or Kazarig in Khazar mythology
- Kutrigur chieftain Zabergan
- in Esperanto, word for Bulgarians
