= Sinnion =

Sinnion (Greek: Σιννίων or Σισίννιος; undetermined origin, perhaps Iranian) was the chieftain of the Kutrigurs, a Turkic nomadic tribe of the Pontic–Caspian steppe.

Sinnion was a veteran of the Vandalic War. Noted for their strength and bravery, Sinnion and Balas led a group of 600 auxiliaries (all mounted archers), at the Battle of Ad Decimum (September 13, 533).

After the Utigurs led by Sandilch had attacked the Kutrigurs, Sinnion succeeded Chinialon as leader of the Kutrigurs between 551 and 558. Having suffered great losses, the Kutrigurs made a peace treaty with Byzantine Empire, and 2000 Kutrigurs with their wives and children were led by Sinnion into the Empire's service and were settled in Thrace. The shelter provided to the Kutrigurs was not well received by Sandilch.

Sinnion was succeeded by Zabergan.

== Sources ==
- Curta, Florin (2015). "Avar Blitzkrieg, Slavic and Bulgar raiders, and Roman special ops: mobile warriors in the 6th-century Balkans". In Zimonyi István; Osman Karatay (eds.). Eurasia in the Middle Ages. Studies in Honour of Peter B. Golden. Wiesbaden: Otto Harrassowitz. pp. 69–89.
- Golden, Peter B. (2011). Studies on the Peoples and Cultures of the Eurasian Steppes. Editura Academiei Române; Editura Istros a Muzeului Brăilei. ISBN 9789732721520.

Preceded by Chinialon	Leader of the Kutrigurs fl. after 551–558	Succeeded by Zabergan
