= Kandik =

Sixth century European monarch

Kandik or Kazrig was one of the three Scythian brothers mentioned in the chronicle of Michael of Syria, the Jacobite Patriarch of Antioch. After leading their Iverian people as refugees away from the Turks as Pseudo-Avar khagans, Kazrig and his brothers Bolgaris and Bayan I approached Sarosius to mediate for him with the Byzantine Empire in 557. They soon conquered the remnant of the Akatziri Hunno-Bulgars also known as Kutrigurs from the time of Ernak.

Preceded by Shaush-over Avars	Avar Khagan; Kutrigur Ruler	Succeeded by Bayan I
