= Saragurs =

Extinct Turkic ethnic group

The Saragurs or Saraguri (Greek: Σαράγουροι, Syriac: s.r.w.r.g.wr, Šarağurs) were a Turkic nomadic tribe mentioned in the 5th and 6th centuries. They may be the Sulujie (蘇路羯, suoluo-kjɐt) mentioned in the Chinese Book of Sui. They originated from Western Siberia and the Kazakh steppes, from where they were displaced north of the Caucasus by the Sabirs.

Around 463 AD, the Akatziri and other tribes that had been part of the Hunnic union were attacked by the Saragurs, one of the first Oghur tribes that entered the Pontic–Caspian steppe as the result of migrations set off in Inner Asia by the Uar attacking the Kidara (a sub-group of the Xiyon). The Akatziri had lived north of the Black Sea, west of Crimea. According to Priscus, in 463 Ernakh and Dengizich sent the representatives of Saragurs, Oghurs (or Urogi, perhaps a Byzantine error for Uyghurs) and Onogurs to the Emperor in Constantinople, and explained they had been driven out of their homeland by the Sabirs, who had been attacked by the Avars in Inner Asia. In 469, the Saragurs requested and received Roman protection. In the late 500s, the Saragurs, Kutrigurs, Utigurs and Onogurs held part of the steppe north of the Black Sea. In 555, Pseudo-Zacharias Rhetor mentions the Saragurs as one of thirteen nomadic tribes north of Caucasus, however, it is uncertain if the tribe still existed at this time. Between 630 and 635, Khan Kubrat managed to unite the Onogur Bulgars with the tribes of the Kutrigurs and Utigurs, and probably the Saragurs, under a single rule, creating a powerful confederation which was referred to by the medieval authors in Western Europe as Old Great Bulgaria, or Patria Onoguria. According to some scholars, it is more correctly called the Onogundur-Bulgar Empire.

Saraγur or Šara Oγur means "yellow" or "white," and can even be translated as "western".

== See also ==
- Onogurs

== Sources ==
- Blockley, R. C. (1992). East Roman Foreign Policy: Formation and Conduct from Diocletian to Anastasius. Cairns. ISBN 978-0-905205-83-0.
- Curta, Florin (2001). The Making of the Slavs: History and Archaeology of the Lower Danube Region, c. 500–700. Cambridge: Cambridge University Press. ISBN 9781139428880.
- Hussey, Joan Mervyn (1966). The Cambridge Medieval History. CUP Archive. pp. 469–. GGKEY:W8456N5J140.
- Golden, Peter Benjamin (1992). An introduction to the History of the Turkic peoples: ethnogenesis and state formation in medieval and early modern Eurasia and the Middle East. Wiesbaden: Otto Harrassowitz. ISBN 9783447032742.
- Golden, Peter B. (2011). Studies on the Peoples and Cultures of the Eurasian Steppes. Editura Academiei Române; Editura Istros a Muzeului Brăilei. ISBN 9789732721520.
- Kim, Hyun Jin (2013). The Huns, Rome and the Birth of Europe. Cambridge University Press. pp. 141–. ISBN 978-1-107-06722-6.
