= Oghuric languages =

Branch of the Turkic languages

Oghuric
- Ogur
- Geographic distribution: Historically: Balkans, Caucasus, Northern China (presumably); Today: Volga region
- Linguistic classification: Turkic: Oghuric
- Subdivisions: Chuvash; † Bulgar; † Onogur; † Khazar (branch classification within the Turkic family is disputed)

Language codes
- Glottolog: bolg1249

The Oghuric, Onoguric (also known as Bulgar or Lir-Turkic) are a branch of the Turkic language family. The only extant member of the group is the Chuvash language. The first to branch off from the Turkic family, the Oghuric languages show significant divergence from other Turkic languages, which all share a later common ancestor. Languages from this family were spoken in some nomadic tribal confederations, such as those of the Onogurs, Bulgars and Khazars.

== History ==
The Oghuric languages are a distinct group of the Turkic languages, standing in contrast to Common Turkic. Today they are represented only by Chuvash. The only other language which is conclusively proven to be Oghuric is the long-extinct Bulgar, while Khazar may be a possible relative within the group. The Hunnic language, spoken by the Huns in Europe in the late fourth and fifth centuries AD, is occasionally described as a form of Bulgharic. This association is primarily based on historical rather than linguistic evidence. The few surviving traces of "Hunnic"—such as a small number of personal names and a few common nouns—lack sufficient evidence to draw definitive conclusions and may actually represent a mix of different languages. Oghuric was the lingua franca of the Khazar state.

There is no consensus among linguists on the relation between Oghuric and Common Turkic and several questions remain unsolved:

- Are they parallel branches of Proto-Turkic (c. 3000 BC–500 BC) and, if so, which branch is more archaic?
- Does Oghuric represent Archaic Turkic before phonetic changes in 100–400 AD and was it a separate language?

Fuzuli Bayat dates the separation into Oghur r-dialects and Oghuz z-dialects to the 2nd millennium BC.

== Features ==
The Oghuric languages are also known as "-r Turkic" because the final consonant in certain words is r, not z as in Common Turkic. For instance, in the Oghuz languages, such as Azeri and Turkish, öküz means ox (totemic animal). Compare the Chuvash wăkăr where the word has maintained the final /r/, and the Kipchak languages, where it is ögiz. Hence the name Oghur corresponds to Oghuz "tribe" in Common Turkic.

Other correspondences are :

Common Turkic		Oghur	Common Turkic	Oghur	Notes
š	→	l	tâš "stone"	tâl "stone"	
s	→	š			The shift from s to š operates before i, ï, and iV, and Dybo calls the sound change the "Bulgar palatalization".
*č	→	ś			
k/q	→	ğ			
y	→	j, ś			
d, δ	→	δ > z (10th cent.) > r (13th cent.)			
ğd	→	z > r (14th cent.)			
a	→	ı (after 9th cent.)			

Denis Sinor presumes that the differences noted above suggest that the Oghur-speaking tribes could not have originated in territories inhabited by speakers of Mongolic languages, given that Mongolian dialects feature the -z suffix. Peter Golden, however, has noted that there are many loanwords in Mongolic from Oghuric, such as Mongolic ikere, Oghuric *ikir, Hungarian iker, Common Turkic *ikiz 'twins', and holds the contradictory view that the Oghur inhabited the borderlands of Mongolia prior to the 5th century.

== Oghuric influence on other languages ==
=== Hungarian ===
The Hungarian language has many borrowings from Turkic languages, with phonological characteristics which indicate that they were borrowed from an Oghuric source language: Hung. tenger, Oghur. *tengir, Comm. *tengiz 'sea', Hung. gyűrű, Oghur. *ǰürük, Comm. *yüzük 'ring'. A number of Hungarian loanwords were borrowed before the 9th century, shown by sz- (< Oğ. *ś-) rather than gy- (< Oğ. *ǰ-), for example Hung. szél, Oghur. *śäl, Chuv. śil, Comm. *yel 'wind', Hung. szűcs 'tailor', and Hung. szőlő 'grapes'.

=== Mongolian ===
The Mongolian loanwords of Oghuric origin include Mon. "ikere" (Oghur. *iker, Chuvash "йĕкĕр", Comm. ekkiz/ikiz), Mon. "biragu" (Oghur. *burǝʷu, Comm. buzagu), Mon. "üker" (Oghur. *hekür, Comm. öküz), and Mon. "jer" (Oghur. *jer, Comm. jez). These loanwords were probably borrowed before the 4th century, before the Turkic migrations to West Asia happened.

== See also ==
- Oghur & Oghuz
- Onogurs
- Saragurs
- Kutrigurs
- Utigurs
