= Chinialon =

6th-century chieftain of the Kutrigurs

Khinialon or Chinialon or Chinialus (Greek: Χινιαλών; undetermined origin) was chieftain of the Kutrigurs. In 551 he came from the "western side of the Maeotic Lake" to assist the Gepids at the war with Lombards with 12,000 Kutrigurs. Later along with the Gepids they plundered the Byzantine lands. However, Byzantine emperor Justinian I (r. 527–565) through diplomatic persuasion and bribery dragged the Kutrigurs and Utigurs into mutual warfare. The Utigurs led by Sandilch attacked the Kutrigurs, who suffered great losses.

== See also ==
- Kutrigurs
- Utigurs

== Sources ==
- Curta, Florin (2015). "Avar Blitzkrieg, Slavic and Bulgar raiders, and Roman special ops: mobile warriors in the 6th-century Balkans". In Zimonyi István; Osman Karatay (eds.). Eurasia in the Middle Ages. Studies in Honour of Peter B. Golden. Wiesbaden: Otto Harrassowitz. pp. 69–89.
- Golden, Peter Benjamin (1992). An introduction to the History of the Turkic peoples: ethnogenesis and state formation in medieval and early modern Eurasia and the Middle East. Wiesbaden: Otto Harrassowitz. ISBN 9783447032742.
- Golden, Peter B. (2011). Studies on the Peoples and Cultures of the Eurasian Steppes. Editura Academiei Române; Editura Istros a Muzeului Brăilei. ISBN 9789732721520.

Preceded by Mugel	Leader of the Kutrigurs fl. 530–551	Succeeded by Sinnion
