= Jawashighar =

Khazar political title, meaning unknown

According to ibn Fadlan, the Jāwashīghar was an official in the Khazar government under the command of the Kündür Khagan, in turn under Khagan Bek's command. Ibn Fadlan did not describe the duties of this officer.

This title had been transcribed in different ways: Jāwshïghr or Jawshïghïr (Togan, 1939), Jāwshīghr (Canard, McKeithen 1979), Jawshighir (Frye, 2005), Jawshīghīr (Lunde & Stone, 2011) and Jāwash(y)īghar (Golden, 1980).

Scholarly theories to etymologize the title include:

- Douglas M. Dunlop (1954) hypothesized that the name derives from the phrase Chavush Uyghur or "Marshal of the Uyghurs";
- Golden (2005:214) proposed that Jāwshīghr might've been garbled from Jawašğır from javaš (Common Turkic yavaš) "gentle, mild" plus agentive suffix -ğır/ğur, thus "the one who makes peace" (cf. Uygh. Buddh. yavaš qıl "to make peace" (Clauson, 1972:880));
- Erdal (2007:80-81) reconstructed Čavïš-yïgar, meaning "the 'marshal' bringing together all the čavïš [who marshalled the ranks in battle and were in charge of order at court]";
- Klyashtorny (1997:22-23) reconstructed Čavšunqar (beg) "head of the royal falcon-hunting" (čav means falcon and šunqar gyrfalcon) and pointed to the Karakhanid title čavlï-beg.

== Sources ==
- Kevin Alan Brook. The Jews of Khazaria. 3rd ed. Lanham, MD: Rowman & Littlefield Publishers, Inc, 2018. ISBN 978-1-5381-0342-5
- Douglas M. Dunlop, The History of the Jewish Khazars, Princeton, N.J.: Princeton University Press, 1954.
- Peter B. Golden, Khazar Studies, Budapest: Akadémiai Kiadó, 1980.
- Peter B. Golden, "Khazarica: Notes on Some Khazar Terms", in Turkic Languages, ed. Lars Johanson, Harrassowitz Verlag, 2005
- Ahmad ibn Fadlan, Mission to the Volga, translated by James Montgomery, foreword by Tom Severin, 2017, NYU Press, 2017.
- Marcel Erdal, "The Khazar Language" in The World of the Khazars. Leiden: Brill, 2007. pp. 75-108
- Sergey Klyashtorny, "About One Khazar Title in ibn Faḍlān" in Manuscripta Orientalia 3.3, Thesa, 1997.
