= Mugel =

Hunnic ruler in Patria Onoguria

Mugel (or Muageris) succeeded his brother Grod (or Grodas), a Hunnic ruler in Patria Onoguria. Grod converted to Christianity on a visit to Constantinople and was established as a Byzantine puppet ruler, but when he began to melt down idols for the silver and electrum of which they were made, he was killed and replaced with Mugel. A Byzantine military expedition expelled the Huns from the city of Bosporus and after a rule of only 2 years, from AD 528 to 530, Mugel was succeeded by a civil war between Sandilch and Khinialon.

There was formerly a common view that Muageris derived from the word magyar, for the Hungarian people. The argument was that the Huns in Crimea were, really, the Onogur, and the names of the two princes mentioned by Malalas' chronicle (Theophanes the Confessor had, in his work also called Chronographia, copied data from the Malalas chronicle, and since he relied upon earlier manuscripts of the work, although not the original of the work, he preserved the Malalas report in more detail) as living in the region of the Maeotian Lake (Sea of Azov) and the Kuban River during the earlier half of the sixth century actually referred to people under the rule of the Magyar tribe. This derivation of the name has been discredited.

== See also ==
- List of kings of the Huns

Preceded by Gordas	Hunnic Ruler; Ruler in Onoguria 'Prince of Kutrigur Bulgars'; 528–530	Succeeded by Khinialon of Kutrigur & Sandilch of Utigur
