= Glom (Hun) =

Hun sub-king

Glom (fl. 528) was a Hun sub-king, or tribe king. He fought for the Sasanian Empire in the late 520s.

== Biography ==
Glom was a king of a section of the Huns. He became an ally of Persian king Kavad I and in 528 fought for him against the queen of the Hunnish tribe of the Sabirs, a woman named Boa (Boarez/Boarek), the widow of Balaq. He was defeated by Boa while marching to aid the Persians against the Romans.

== Etymology ==
His name might be of Iranian origin.

== Sources ==
- Maenchen-Helfen, Otto John (1973), The World of the Huns: Studies in Their History and Culture, University of California Press, ISBN 9780520015968
- Agathias (1975), The Histories, Walter de Gruyter, ISBN 978-3-11-082694-4
- Clauson, Gerard (1972). An Etymological Dictionary of Pre-Thirteenth-Century Turkish. Oxford: Clarendon Press.
- Golden, Peter Benjamin (1980). Khazar studies: An Historico-Philological Inquiry into the Origins of the Khazars. Vol. 1. Budapest: Akadémiai Kiadó. ISBN 9630515490.
- Sinor, Denis (1990), The Cambridge History of Early Inner Asia, Cambridge University Press, ISBN 978-0-521-24304-9
- Golden, Peter Benjamin (1992). An introduction to the History of the Turkic peoples: ethnogenesis and state formation in medieval and early modern Eurasia and the Middle East. Wiesbaden: Otto Harrassowitz. ISBN 9783447032742.
- Golden, Peter Benjamin (2013). "Some Notes on the Etymology of Sabirs". In Alexander A. Sinitsyn; Maxim M. Kholod (eds.). Κοινον Δωρον - Studies and Essays in Honour of Valery P. Nikonorov on the Occasion of His Sixtieth Birthday presented by His Friends and Colleagues. St. Petersburg State University - Faculty of Philology. pp. 49–55.
- Greatrex, Geoffrey; Lieu, Samuel N. C. (2007), The Roman Eastern Frontier and the Persian Wars Ad 363-628, Psychology Press, ISBN 978-0-415-46530-4
- Golden, Peter B. (2011). Studies on the Peoples and Cultures of the Eurasian Steppes. Editura Academiei Române; Editura Istros a Muzeului Brăilei. ISBN 9789732721520.
- Boris Zhivkov (2015). Khazaria in the Ninth and Tenth Centuries. Brill. ISBN 9789004294486.
- Zimonyi, Istvan (2015), Muslim Sources on the Magyars in the Second Half of the 9th Century: The Magyar Chapter of the Jayhānī Tradition, BRILL, ISBN 978-90-04-30611-0
