= Drypia =

Drypia (Greek: Δρυπία), also Dripeia (Δριπεία) or Grypes (Γρύπες), was a Byzantine-era settlement and rural suburb of Constantinople.

== Localization ==
In his studies on the topography of Constantinople, Raymond Janin identified the site with the locality of Ayazmaderesi, some 14 kilometres (8.7 mi) west of the Theodosian Walls, but this is rejected by Andreas Külzer, who identifies it—via the later corrupted form Grypes—with the modern Istanbul district of Bağcılar.

== History ==
In early Byzantine times, the settlement was known for its church dedicated to Thomas the Apostle, established in the late 4th century. In late 398, Empress Aelia Eudoxia ordered the translation of the relics of several unnamed saints to Dripya, which was done in a long procession from the Hagia Sophia. This was the occasion for a homily by John Chrysostom, then the Archbishop of Constantinople. The church is no longer mentioned in later times, and was probably destroyed in a raid during the 6th century. Thus already in 559, taking advantage of the destruction of parts of the Anastasian Wall during an earthquake two years before, the Kutrigurs raided the suburbs of Constantinople, including Drypia.

The settlement continued to be inhabited as shown by a fragmentary funeral inscription dating to the 8th/9th century, but the site is next mentioned only in historical accounts by George Pachymeres for 1299, when Emperor Andronikos II Palaiologos spent a few days in the village during his journey west to Thessalonica, and again for 1304, when Andronikos' son and co-emperor Michael IX Palaiologos also stopped there on his return from campaigning against the Ottoman Turks. Finally, a 1323 document of the Hilandar Monastery of Mount Athos mentions two local landowners, John Ktenas and Angelitzes Karyanites.

A church dedicated to St. George, which existed on the site in 1798, probably had a Byzantine antecedent. It also featured a chapel with a hagiasma (holy spring) dedicated to John the Forerunner. Similar springs dedicated to the Transfiguration of Christ and to Saint Photini are attested in the vicinity during the 19th century.

== Sources ==
- Allen, Pauline; Mayer, Wendy (2002). John Chrysostom. Routledge. ISBN 0-415-18252-2.
- Janin, Raymond (1964). Constantinople byzantine. Développement urbaine et répertoire topographique (in French) (Deuxième édition ed.). Paris: Institut français d'études byzantines.
- Külzer, Andreas (2008). Tabula Imperii Byzantini: Band 12, Ostthrakien (Eurōpē) (in German). Vienna: Österreichische Akademie der Wissenschaften. ISBN 978-3-7001-3945-4.
