= The Tales of an Old Drunkard =

13th-century Chinese story collection by Luo Ye

- Traditional Chinese: 醉翁談錄
- Simplified Chinese: 醉翁谈录
Transcriptions
Standard Mandarin
- Hanyu Pinyin: Zuì Wēng Tán Lù

The Tales of an Old Drunkard, or The Drunken Man's Talk, is a 13th-century Chinese story collection from the early Yuan dynasty (1271–1368). It was written by Luo Ye (羅燁), a Luling County (盧陵; modern Ji'an County) native who became a resident of the Southern Song dynasty capital Lin'an Prefecture (modern Hangzhou).

The only extant copy was discovered in Japan in the early 20th century.

== English translations ==
- Lo Yeh (1981). The Tales of an Old Drunkard. Translated by Gabriele Foccardi. Otto Harrassowitz. ISBN 3-447-02219-1.
- Luo Ye (2015). The Drunken Man's Talk: Tales from Medieval China. Translated by Alister D. Inglis. University of Washington Press. ISBN 978-0-295-99473-4.

External links

- The Chinese original in Wikisource
