= Sarosius =

Sarosius /səˈroʊʒəs/ (Greek: Σαρώσιος, Sarṓsios), also called Sarodius /səˈroʊdiəs/ (Σαρώδιος Sarṓdios) or Saroes /ˈsæroʊiːz/ (Σαρόης Saróēs), was the king of the Alans in the early 6th century while they were still in Ukraine. He acted as diplomatic negotiator between the Central Asian Pseudo-Avar refugees led by Kandik and the Byzantine emperor Justinian I in 557 and then again between Justin II and the Turks in 569. From the latter we learn that the Avars whom Sarosios helped in 557 were in fact renegades from the Rouran Khaganate and apparently had no right to use the title of Avar Khagan. The diplomatic ties that Sarosios fostered led to the Göktürks' agreement with Emperor Maurice in 598, to support a ruler, Sandilch, approved of by the Ashina clan.

The only written source about Sarosius is Menander the Guardsman's History.
