= Melantias =

Ancient settlement in Eastern Thrace

Coordinates: 41.0584°N 28.7384°E

Melantias (Greek: Μελαντιάς), often also Melantiada, Melentiana, Melitias, or Melitiada, was a settlement in Eastern Thrace in Roman and Byzantine times, near the city of Constantinople (modern Istanbul, Turkey).

== Location ==
The village lay on the road between Athyras (modern Büyükçekmece) and Rhegion (modern Küçükçekmece), near the modern suburb of Hoşköy. In the 18th century, it was erroneously localized at Kınıklı, west of Silivri; Konrad Miller located it not at Hoşköy, but at Yarımburgaz further east.

== History ==
The origin of the settlement is unknown. It has been suggested that the name derives from the ancient Thracian tribe of the Melanditae, but it is more likely that the name (from the root melas, "black") was given due to the area's black soil. Due to its location on one of the main roads leading to Byzantion/Constantinople, the village is mentioned in the late Roman itineraries such as the Tabula Peutingeriana or the Ravenna Cosmography. An imperial villa is attested in Melantias during Emperor Valens' ill-fated campaign against the Goths in 378.

As a suburb of Constantinople, Melantias is often mentioned in conjunction with enemy raids or invasions targeting the imperial capital. Thus according to Michael the Syrian the town was raided by the Ostrogoths under Theoderic the Great in 486/87, while Agathias records that the Kutrigurs under Zabergan camped there in 558/89, shortly before they were defeated and driven back by Belisarius in the Battle of Melantias. During the Avar–Slavic siege of Constantinople in 626, the Avar vanguard made camp at Melantias before reaching the capital.

In 886, Emperor Basil I the Macedonian was killed in a hunting accident somewhere between Melantias and Apameia. By c. 1000, according to the Suda encyclopedia, Melantias was commonly known as Melitias (Μελιτιὰς). In the early 14th century, the village belonged to the landowner Eudokia of Constantinople. Melantias is last mentioned in late June 1385, when another battle was fought there, between Emperor John V Palaiologos and his usurping son, Andronikos IV Palaiologos. Andronikos was defeated, and fled to Selymbria (Silivri), where he died after a few days.

== Sources ==
- Frendo, Joseph D., ed. (1975). Agathias: The Histories. Berlin and New York: Walter de Gruyter. ISBN 3-11-003357-7.
- Külzer, Andreas (2008). Tabula Imperii Byzantini: Band 12, Ostthrakien (Eurōpē) (in German). Vienna: Österreichische Akademie der Wissenschaften. ISBN 978-3-7001-3945-4.
- Miller, Konrad (1916). Itineraria Romana: Römische Reisewege an der Hand der Tabula Peutingeriana dargestellt [Itineraria Romana: Roman routes shown in the Tabula Peutingeriana] (in German). Stuttgart: Stecker and Schröder.
