= Kievan Letter =

c. 930 CE Hebrew-language letter; first mention of Kyiv (Kiev)

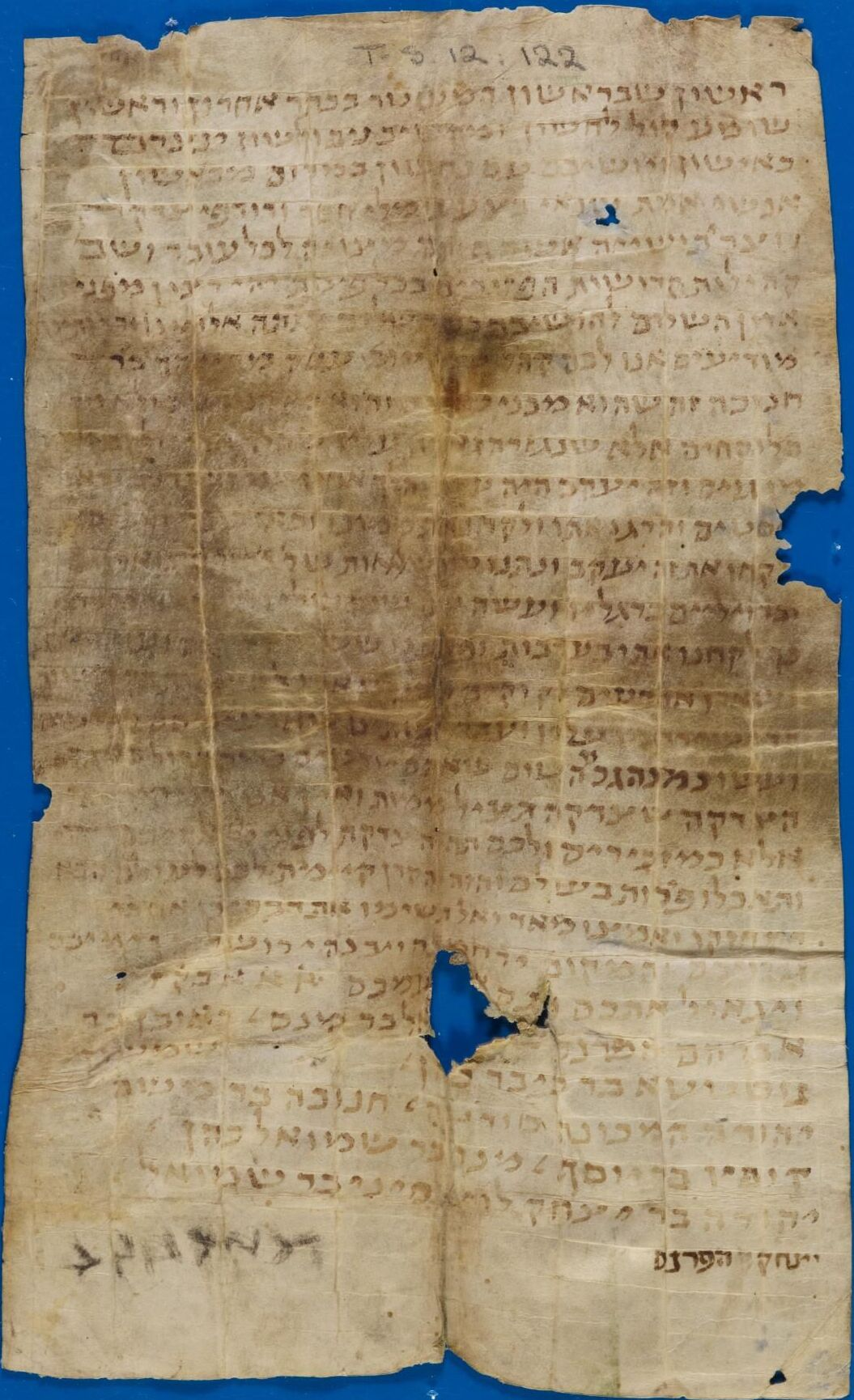
Kievan Letter, T-S 12.12, Cambridge University Library

The Kievan Letter, or Kyivan letter is a letter thought to be written by, or to, representatives of the Jewish community in Kiev and dated to the 10th or 11th century. The origin of the letter and whether it is connected to the Khazars or has a Slavic origin is disputed by historians and linguists. The letter is part of the Cairo Geniza collection and came to broader attention in the 1960s.

== History and provenance ==
The letter has typically been dated to the 10th century. It was part of the collection brought to Cambridge University by Solomon Schechter from the Cairo Geniza in Egypt. The letter was rediscovered in 1962 during a survey of the Geniza documents by Norman Golb of the University of Chicago and published by Golb and Omeljan Pritsak, who connected it to the Khazarian Jews. It was dated by Pritsak to around 930 CE. The text is a Hebrew-language recommendation written on behalf of or by an individual named Jacob bar Hanukkah, who needed assistance to cover a debt he had inherited. Some of the signed names at the end are apparently non-Semitic. Some think (on the basis of the "pleading" nature of the text, mentioned below) that the letter dates from a time when Khazars were no longer a dominant force in the politics of the city. According to Marcel Erdal, the letter does not come from Kiev but was sent to Kiev. The letter's identification as Kievan or a connection to the Khazars is controversial and robustly contested.

Prieto and Outhwaite contest the Khazarian provenance of the letter or its connection to the Radhanites, or of the relationship between the letter's main body and the apparently Turkish runiform word at the end of the letter. Most likely, according to them, it has a Slavic origin, noting the example of later patristic inscriptions from Christian Novgorodians under the Rus'. They propose Slavic origins of the names in the letter, and also identify cultural links with Byzantium. They propose a dating in the later 10th or 11th century. They note different types of ink used, carbon ink versus iron gall ink, which may indicate the runes were added in a different time and place, as well as the parchment folding pattern and the hand indicative of a later date, with possible Byzantine or Palestinian characteristics. Pritsak's emphasis on the Khazars is also disputed by Petro Tolochko and Constantin Zuckerman. Zuckerman believes Pritsak's dating is impossible, and identifies the Geniza document as a copy. He contests the premise that the runes were inscribed in Kiev. Zuckerman, based on analyzing the monetary units used (zaquq) associated with the Ashkenazi, proposes the document was originally meant for a journey west to the Carolingian Empire and not east to Khazar territory, and dates the document later than Golb and Pritsak, to 961, around the expulsion of Adalbert, while Shapira dates it to 968-71. Zuckerman believes the price mentioned in the letter would have been equivalent to the price in grivna to redeem or ransom a captive. Prieto and Outhwaite consider this level of high precision in dating not justifiable.

== Linguistic identification ==
The linguistic identity of the runic inscription and the non-Semitic names remain contested. Pritsak reads the apparently Turkic runic word as the Khazarian hoqurūm based on its similarity to Chuvash. This is contested by Kyzlasov and Napol'skikh, who per Zuckerman, identify Pritsak's translation as "linguistically impossible." The implicit assumption that it genuinely is Khazarian is problematic, as the letter would be the only written record of the Khazar language extant today, the single word-phrase "I have read [it]". Erdal favours Bolgar-Chuvash (hakurüm from the reconstructed verb *okï-, 'call out, recite, read') and suggests that it originated in the Danube-Bulgar region. Zuckerman finds Erdal's hypothesis implausible, stating that the Bulgars were not known to have used the runic script. Zuckerman proposed that the runic inscription could have been added by a Khazar official to certify copy of the letter, a laissez-passer or travel document, for a local Jewish community head at a transit hub such as Sarkel or Atil, without the letter itself being connected to the Khazars.

Ligeti, as elaborated by Prieto and Outhwaite, notes that Turkic rune usage by Kyivan Khazars is unlikely, and not exclusive to them. The identification of Chuvan, like Bolgarian, actually argues against the idea that the runes are Khazarian in origin or usage, as Khazarian was more likely a Common Turkish language, and the state was polyglot and polyethnic. Although the theory that the runes are Turkic cannot be ruled out, Prieto and Outhwaite consider Pritsak's hypotheses to be tenuously constructed. They note the terminology "I have read it" is characteristic of Byzantine chancellery, unlikely to have been used by the Khazars, and consider that the runes may have been inserted by another Turkic group trading in the area, and ultimately find the identification as Khazar questionable. Zuckerman proposes that the runes were added not in Kiev, but wherever the letter was copied, noting that the Jewish community head in Kiev was Abraham, not Isaac. Napolskikh claimed that Pritsak's phonetic assignments were arbitrary. Prieto and Outhwaite are skeptical of the copy hypothesis.

Per Prieto and Outhwaite, Erdal and Peter B. Golden point out flaws in Pritsak's identifications, with Erdal noting "philological and linguistic errors" in Pritsak's identification of Turkic origins for the non-Semitic names. Zuckerman and Kulik believe the Slavic interpretation for the non-Semitic names is more plausible, such as Gostjata (guest or trader) for GWSTT, and sirota for SWRTH, meaning orphan. Zuckerman cites Abram N. Torpusman and Vladimir Orjol identifying a known Slavic origin for some of the names, which had not been contested that he was aware of.

== Translation ==
1. First among the foremost, the One who is crowned with the coronet of last and first,
2. He who hears the whispering voice, and pays attention to the fruit (of the lips) and tongue – may He protect them
3. like the apple (of His eye), and let them dwell with Naḥshon on high from the first.
4. Men of truth and haters of unjust gain, who accomplish acts of kindness and pursue righteousness,
5. keepers of sound wisdom, who make their food available to all passers-by,
6. holy communities who are scattered to every corner – may it be the will
7. of the Lord of Peace to bring them to dwell in a peaceful habitation. And now, our leaders and our lords,
8. we, the community of Kyiv, are informing you of the affair of this master Jacob b.
9. Ḥanukka, who is of good family. He was one of the givers and not one of
10. the takers, until fate decreed for him that his brother should go and borrow money
11. from non-Jews, while this Jacob acted as guarantor. This man’s brother then took to the road and encountered
12. bandits who killed him and took his money. The lenders then came
13. and took this Jacob and put iron chains about his neck
14. and a pair of fetters on his feet. He remained in that state for a whole year, (until)
15. we took him on guarantee, having paid out sixty coins.
16. 40 coins still remain (to be paid), so we have sent him out among the holy communities
17. so that they can show him mercy. And now, our lords, raise your eyes heavenwards
18. and act in your usual good way, for you know how great a virtue
19. charity is, that charity can save from death. And we are not presuming to teach you this,
20. but only reminding you of it. May the Lord your God grant you righteousness,
21. and may you eat (its) fruits in this world while the (spiritual) capital is laid up for you in the world to come.
22. Just be strong and take great courage, and do not put our words behind
23. your backs. May the Lord have mercy on you and rebuild Jerusalem in your lifetime,
24. and may he redeem you as well as us with you. We are your brothers in a distant corner.
25. Abraham the Parnas._ [ ]ʾel b. MNS. Reuben b. Samson
26. GWSṬṬʾ b. KYBR Kohen.
27. Judah who is called SWRṬH. Ḥanukka b. Moses.
28. QWPYN b. Joseph. MNR b. Samuel Kohen.
29. Judah b. Isaac Levi. Sinai b. Samuel.
30. Isaac the Parnas. (HWQWRWM (hoqurüm))

== See also ==
- History of the Jews in Kyiv
- History of the Jews in Ukraine
