= Sabir people =

5th-7th–century nomadic ethnic group north of the Caucasus

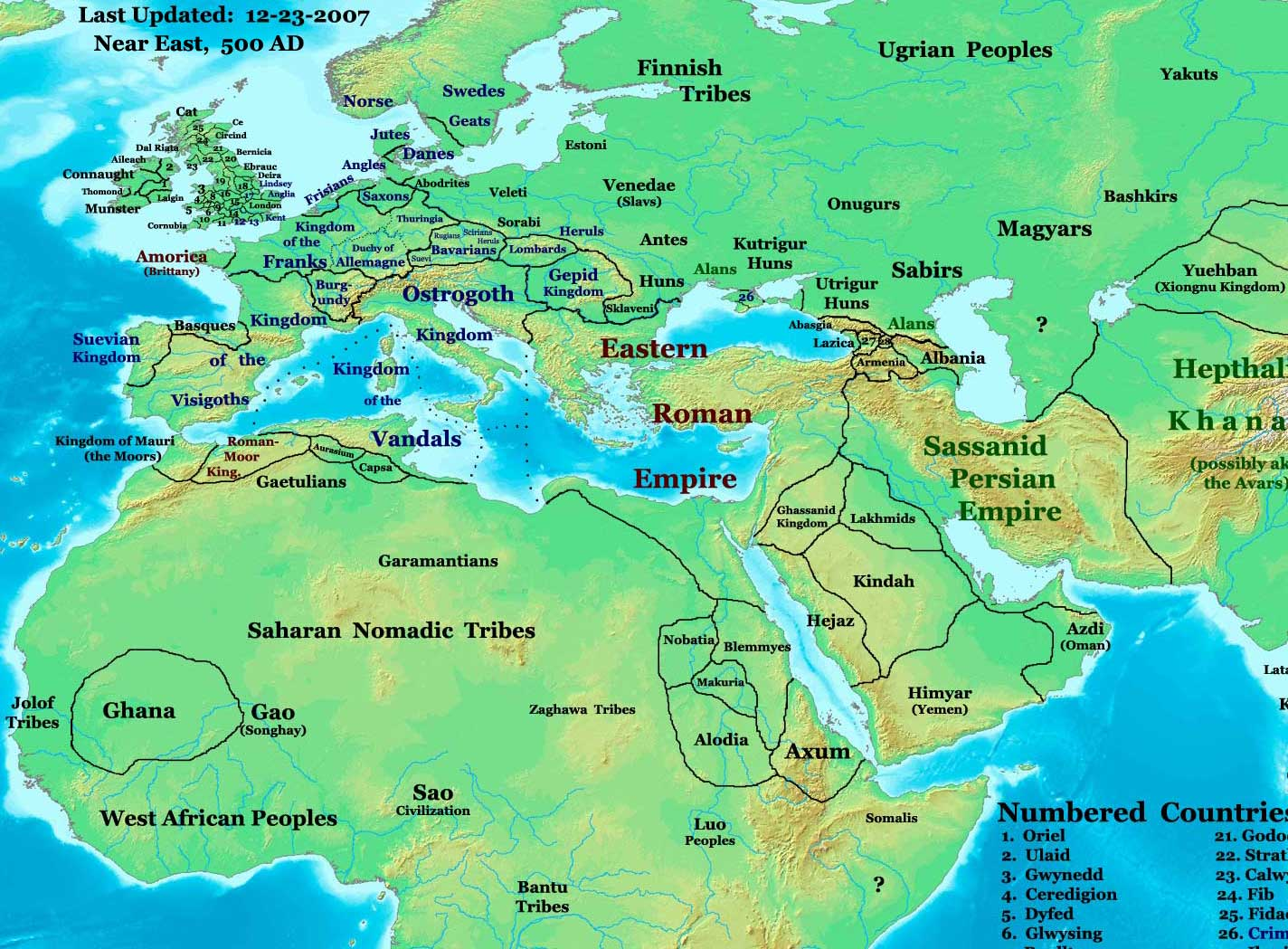
Near East in 500 AD, showing the Sabirs and neighboring peoples.

The Sabirs (Savirs, Suars, Sawar, Sawirk among others; Greek: Σάβιροι,) were a nomadic Turkic equestrian people who lived in the north of the Caucasus beginning in the late-5th–7th century, on the eastern shores of the Black Sea, in the Kuban area, and possibly came from Western Siberia. They were skilled in warfare, used siege machinery, had a large army (including women) and were boat-builders. They were also referred to as Huns, a title applied to various Eurasian nomadic tribes in the Pontic-Caspian Steppe during late antiquity. Sabirs led incursions into Transcaucasia in the late-400s/early-500s, but quickly began serving as soldiers and mercenaries during the Byzantine–Sasanian Wars on both sides. Their alliance with the Byzantines laid the basis for the later Khazar-Byzantine alliance.

== Etymology ==
Gyula Németh and Paul Pelliot considered Turkic etymology for Säbir / Sabïr / Sabar / Säβir / Sävir / Savar / Sävär / Sawār / Säwēr from the root *sap- 'to go astray', i.e. the 'wanderers, nomads', placed in a group of semantically similar names: Qazar, Qazaq, Yazar, and Qačar. Al-Masudi recorded that the Khazars were named as such in Persian, while in Turkic it is Sabir, implying the same semantic meaning, and related ethnogenesis.

However, Golden notes that root *sap-'s aorist (ending in -ar) is sapar; according to Gerard Clauson, the meanings "to go astray, to deviate" of root sap- ~ sep- only appeared as new words in later medieval period. (Note: As for the earliest attested meanings, sep- meant "to repair (something broken)" in Old Turkic and "to equip, fit out" in Old Uyghur and sap- meant "to instil, graft" in Old Uyghur) Golden suggests possible derivations (though still problematic) from other roots: sav- "to drive away, repulse, avoid, escape from", which fits better into the category of ethnonyms denoting nomads; or sipir- "to sweep, [...] to drive out, to send away", whose derivative would mean "those who sweep away [their foes]", even though the a/ä vocalization is unattested (unlike sipir- > süpür-).

Walter Bruno Henning considered to have found them in the Sogdian Nafnamak (near Turpan) long after the 5th century. Some scholars related their name to the name of Siberia (e.g. Harmatta), with a far-eastern Xianbei (e.g. Pritsak) and Finno-Ugric origin (e.g. Artamonov). The ancient historians related and differed them from the Huns, implying their mixed descent.

Byzantine documents normally refer to Sabirs as Sabiroi, although the Byzantine Emperor Constantine VII Porphyrogennetos (908–959) writes in his De Administrando Imperio that he was told by a Hungarian delegation visiting his court that the Tourkoi (the Byzantine name for the Hungarians) used to be called "sabartoi asphaloi", generally considered to mean "steadfast Sabirs", and still regularly sent delegations to those who stayed behind in the Caucasus region near Persia. Possibly some Hungarian group derived from the Sabirs as their name is reflected in Szavard, and personal clan name Zuard.

== History ==
In 463 AD, Priscus mentions that the Sabirs attacked the Saragurs, Oghurs and Onogurs, as a result of having themselves been attacked by the Avars. It has been suggested that the nomadic motion began with the Chinese attack in 450–458 against the Rouran Khaganate.

In 504 and 515, they held raids around the Caucasus, which was the Sasanian northern frontier during the rule of king Kavadh I, causing problems to the Persians in their war against the Byzantine Empire. It has been proposed that the 20,000 Huns led by Zilgibis were Sabirs. They made treaties with both Justin I and Kavadh I, but decided on the former, which resulted in mutual agreement between Justin I and Kavadh I, and the former devastating attack on Zilgibis and his army.

In 520s, the Queen Boareks, widow of the Sabir chieftain Balaq (Turkic balaq) through Justinian I's diplomacy came closer to the Byzantines, and successfully attacked two Hunnic leaders Astera/Styrax (executed in Constantinople) and Aglanos/Glones (Sasanian ally). She ruled over 100,000 people and could field 20,000 strong-men army. At the Battle of Satala (530), a mixed Persian army led by Mihr-Mihroe consisted of circa three thousand Sabirs. In December 531, many Sabirs were summoned by the Persians to plunder around Euphratesia, Cyrrhus, Cilicia, but some of the booty had been returned by the Roman magister militum.

During the Lazic War (541–562), in 548, along with the Alans they allied with Gubazes II of Lazica and conquered the Petra from the Persians. In 551, some Sabirs were allied to Bessas in the successful attempt to wrest Petra from the Persians, meanwhile, other four thousand led by Mihr-Mihroe were part of the unsuccessful siege of Archaeopolis. In 556, two thousand Sabirs served as heavy infantry mercenaries of the Byzantine Empire against the Sasanian Empire. They were led by Balmaq (Turkic barmaq, "finger"), Kutilzis (Turkic *qut-il-či, with qut meaning "majesty") and Iliger (Turkic Ilig-ār, "prince-man"). They won against the three thousand Dilimnites near Archaeopolis. Eight hundred Dilimnites were killed in a failed rush. In the same year, some five thousand Sabirs allied to the Persians were killed by three thousand Roman horsemen.

As part of the Byzantine–Sasanian War of 572–591, in 572–573, Sabirs lost as part of the Sasanian mixed army against the Marcian near Nisibis. In 578, some eight thousand Sabirs and Arab allies were on the side of the Persians and raided territory around Resaena and Constantia.

The Syriac translation of the Pseudo-Zacharias Rhetor's Ecclesiastical History (c. 555) in Western Eurasia recorded thirteen tribes, including the sbr (Sabir). They are described in typical phrases reserved for nomads in the ethnographic literature of the period, as people who "live in tents, earn their living on the meat of livestock and fish, of wild animals and by their weapons (plunder)".

The Armenian and Arabic sources placed them in the North Caucasus, near Laks, Alans, Filān, Masqat, Sāhib as-Sarīr and the Khazar town Samandar. By the late 6th century, the coming of the Pannonian Avars into Europe terminated the Sabir union in the North Caucasus. According to Theophylact Simocatta, when the Barsils, Onogurs and Sabirs saw the invading Uar and Chunni they panicked because thought the invaders were the Avars. Menander Protector placed the events between 558 and 560. He mentioned them last time in connection with the Byzantine conquest in Caucasian Albania during the reign of Tiberius II Constantine (578–582), but the large sums were not enough to stop them to rejoin the Persians.

They were assimilated into the Khazars and Bulgars confederations. The tribe Suwāz in Volga Bulgaria is related to the city Suwār in the same state, and North Caucasian kingdom Suwār. However, it is uncertain whether these Suwār i.e. Sawâr are the Sabirs who gone to the North Caucasus and after 558 retreated to the Volga, came there as the result of the Khazar state creation, or were tribes who never went to the North Caucasus, but stopped on the Volga. Ahmad ibn Fadlan recorded that in the 10th century they still had their own leader with the title Wirgh (*Vuyrigh, Turkic Buyruq), and there were some Suwār-Bulghar hostilities.

There is no reliable information supporting the view of Mikhail Artamonov, who has claimed the intermixing of the Sabirs and Khazars was facilitated by their common Bulgar ethnicity, or that they were Turkicized Ugrians. Károly Czeglédy considered that the Khazar state was composed of three basic groups, including the Sabirs. Dieter Ludwig suggested that the Khazars were Sabirs who had formed an alliance with the Uar of Khwarezm. The intimate ties between the Hungarians and the Sabirs led Lev Gumilev to speculate that rather than Oghuric they may have been Ugric speakers (both terms being of the same etymological origin). Al-Biruni remarked that the language of the Volga Bulgars and Sawârs was "compounded of Turkic and Khazar", while modern scholars like Gyula Németh, Lajos Ligeti and Peter Benjamin Golden consider that the Sabirs spoke standard Turkic rather than Oghuric Turkic.

== Legacy ==
A number of Caucasian toponyms derive from their name; Šaberan, Samir, Samirkent, Sabir-xost, Sibir-don, Sivir-don, Savir, Bila-suvar, Sebir-oba, Sevare, Suvar, and as well as the subdivisions Sabar and Sabur/Sabïr of the Kyrgyz. Chuvash historians postulate that their nation is descended from Sabirs. In the Mari language modern Volga Tatars are called Suas; Chuvash also are known as Suasenmari (which means Suar-icized Mari), or in Finnish Suaslanmari.

== Chieftains ==
- Balaq (Turkic balaq, 'child, boy', 'young of an animal')
- Boa/Boarez/Boareks - Sabir queen, widow of Balaq
- Balmaq/Barmaq (Turkic barmaq, 'finger')
- Iliger (Turkic 'prince-man')
- Kutilzis (Turkic qut-ilči/elči, 'heavenly good fortune' – 'majesty')

== See also ==
- Onogurs
- Khazars
- Hungarian prehistory
- North Caucasian Huns

== Sources ==
- Maenchen-Helfen, Otto John (1973), The World of the Huns: Studies in Their History and Culture, University of California Press, ISBN 9780520015968
- Agathias (1975), The Histories, Walter de Gruyter, ISBN 978-3-11-082694-4
- Clauson, Gerard (1972). An Etymological Dictionary of Pre-Thirteenth-Century Turkish. Oxford: Clarendon Press.
- Golden, Peter Benjamin (1980). Khazar studies: An Historico-Philological Inquiry into the Origins of the Khazars. Vol. 1. Budapest: Akadémiai Kiadó. ISBN 9630515490.
- Sinor, Denis (1990), The Cambridge History of Early Inner Asia, Cambridge University Press, ISBN 978-0-521-24304-9
- Golden, Peter Benjamin (1992). An introduction to the History of the Turkic peoples: ethnogenesis and state formation in medieval and early modern Eurasia and the Middle East. Wiesbaden: Otto Harrassowitz. ISBN 9783447032742.
- Golden, Peter Benjamin (2013). "Some Notes on the Etymology of Sabirs". In Alexander A. Sinitsyn; Maxim M. Kholod (eds.). Κοινον Δωρον - Studies and Essays in Honour of Valery P. Nikonorov on the Occasion of His Sixtieth Birthday presented by His Friends and Colleagues. St. Petersburg State University - Faculty of Philology. pp. 49–55.
- Greatrex, Geoffrey; Lieu, Samuel N. C. (2007), The Roman Eastern Frontier and the Persian Wars Ad 363-628, Psychology Press, ISBN 978-0-415-46530-4
- Golden, Peter B. (2011). Studies on the Peoples and Cultures of the Eurasian Steppes. Editura Academiei Române; Editura Istros a Muzeului Brăilei. ISBN 9789732721520.
- Boris Zhivkov (2015). Khazaria in the Ninth and Tenth Centuries. Brill. ISBN 9789004294486.
- Zimonyi, Istvan (2015), Muslim Sources on the Magyars in the Second Half of the 9th Century: The Magyar Chapter of the Jayhānī Tradition, BRILL, ISBN 978-90-04-30611-0
