= Oriens Christianus =

- Discipline: Eastern Christianity
- Language: English, French, German
- Edited by: Hubert Kaufhold, Manfred Kropp

Publication details
- History: 1901-present
- Publisher: Harrassowitz Verlag (Germany)
- Frequency: Annually

Standard abbreviations
- ISO 4: Oriens Christ.

Indexing
- ISSN: 0340-6407
- LCCN: unk83072246
- OCLC no.: 1642167

Links
- Journal homepage; Online table of contents

Oriens Christianus (English: "Christian East") is an academic journal established in 1901 by Otto Harrassowitz with Asian and oriental studies as the major focus. It was edited by Anton Baumstark (1872-1948). The current editors-in-chief are Hubert Kaufhold (LMU Munich) and Manfred Kropp (University of Mainz).

Its domain is Christianity in the Middle East from Georgia and Armenia to Ethiopia and Asian Christian communities as far as India and China. According to the founder of the program, all elements of the spiritual and material culture of the Christian communities of the East can be addressed. The journal publishes background articles, minutes of reading, but also source-texts in the various languages of Eastern Christendom. Articles can be written in different languages.

The review was led until 1941 (with brief interruptions) by its founder Carl Anton Baumstark, who has published 140 feature articles and 145 book reviews accounts.
