= Samvatas =

Samvatas (also Sambatas, Greek: Σαμβατας) is a historical name for Kyiv or its fortress. It is attested in the 10th century by the Byzantine emperor Constantine Porphyrogenitus, who reports in the treatise De Administrando Imperio (c. 948) regarding the "fortress of Kioava, called Sambatas". It is a hapax legomenon; the toponym is not mentioned anywhere else.

== Etymology and historical evidence ==
Attempts to explain the etymology of the word do not yet have a reliable basis. It has been proposed to derive it from Slavic, Scandinavian, or Turkic languages.

A Slavic etymology was proposed by the Polish linguist Stanisław Rospond, who reconstructed the toponym as Samvatas — Samvadas — *Sǫvodъ (backwater/confluence), in the sense of a harbor for river boats (on the trade route from the Varangians to the Greeks).

The Scandinavian version compares the name with the Swedish: sambåd, a term which in medieval Sweden designated a place for gathering tribute for the leidang, a naval military expedition.

The version claiming a Khazar origin enjoys the greatest popularity. Proponents of this hypothesis translate Sambatas as "Upper Fortress", from the Turkic words sam- ("high, upper") and bat ("strong"), or link it to the name of the legendary "Sabbath river" Sambation (compare Romanian: Sâmbătă — Saturday), which in Jewish literature flowed at the edge of the earth in the land of the lost ten tribes of Israel. In this case, the name could have arisen within the Jewish-Khazar community existing in Kyiv.

In Western historiography, the mention of Sambatas is sometimes interpreted as evidence of the Khazars founding Kyiv.

== See also ==
- Kievian Letter
- Khazars
- Names of Kiev

== Sources ==
- Arkhipov, A. A. (2002). "Об одном древнем названии Киева" [On one ancient name of Kiev]. Из истории русской культуры [From the History of Russian Culture] (in Russian). Vol. 2/1. Moscow: Yazyki slavyanskoy kultury. pp. 30–46. ISBN 5-7859-0142-0.
- Melin, Elsa (2003). ""Sambatas" and the City Names in Ch. IX of Constantine Porphyrogenetus 'De Administrando Imperio'". Die Welt der Slaven. XLVIII: 187–192.
- Rospond, S. (1968). "Значение древнерусской ономастики для истории: к этимологии топонима Киев" [The significance of Old Russian onomastics for history: on the etymology of the toponym Kiev]. Voprosy jazykoznanija (in Russian) (1): 103–108.
- "Sambat, Sambatas". Радянська енциклопедія історії України [Soviet Encyclopedia of History of Ukraine] (in Ukrainian). Vol. 4. Kyiv: Ukrainian Soviet Encyclopedia. 1972. p. 50.
- Vortman, D. Ya. (2009). "Sambatas". Енциклопедія історії України [Encyclopedia of History of Ukraine] (in Ukrainian). Vol. 9. Kyiv: Naukova Dumka. p. 429. ISBN 978-966-00-1290-5.
- Zotsenko, V. M. (1994). "Ще раз про "Самбатас"" [Once again about "Sambatas"]. Старожитності Русі-України [Antiquities of Rus-Ukraine] (in Ukrainian). Kyiv. pp. 126–132.
