= Altınbaş University =

Private university in İstanbul, Turkey

- Motto: Seni "en iyi sen" yapar
- Motto in English: Brings out the best in you
- Type: Private
- Established: 2008
- Affiliations: International Student Partnership Association (ISPA) , Acadex
- Rector: Prof. Dr. Cemal İbiş
- Students: 11.450
- Location: Istanbul, Turkey; 41°03′25″N 28°49′13″E
- Campus: Mahmutbey Technology Campus Bakırköy Health Sciences Campus Gayrettepe Social Sciences Campus,
- Language: English, Turkish
- Colors: Red, White
- Website: www.altinbas.edu.tr

Altınbaş University is a foundation university in Istanbul, Turkey. The university was established in 2008 as Istanbul Kemerburgaz University and changed to its current name in 2017. Altınbaş University has more than 5000 international students from 89 countries, approximately 40% of the students are international. The university has 3 campuses located in Istanbul, which are in Bağcılar, Bakırköy and Şişli. Home to 9 undergraduate schools, 3 graduate schools, 2 vocational schools as of the academic year 2019–2020, Altınbaş University is currently offering 30 bachelor's degree programmes, 34 associate degree programmes, 28 master's degree programmes and 6 PhD programmes.

== Accreditations ==
Officially recognized by the YÖK – Yüksekögretim Kurulu (YÖK – Council of Higher Education), Altinbas Üniversitesi (AU) is a medium-sized (uniRank enrollment range: 8,000-8,999 students) coeducational Turkish higher education institution.

The university is accredited by the European Union and a number of Arab countries such as Syria, Saudi Arabia and Egypt.

== Acadex Affiliation ==
Altinbas University became a member of the Acadex global association that standardized the admission process and orientation programs.

== Altinbas University Tuition ==
Altinbas University fees for medicine are 22,500.00 USD yearly, undergraduate fees 5,100.00 USD per year.

The university gives a 5% discount for non-installment payment.

== Faculties ==
- School of Medicine
- School of Engineering and Natural Sciences
- School of Dentistry
- School of Pharmacy
- School of Economic and Administrative Sciences
- School of Law
- School of applied sciences
- School of Management
- School of Fine Arts and Design

== University Gallery ==
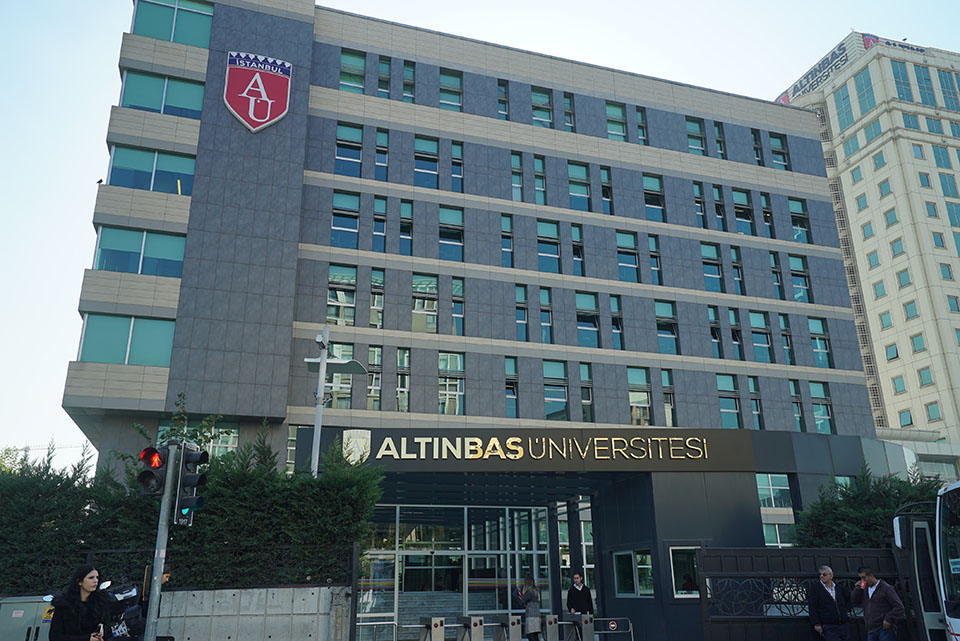
Mahmutbey Campus (Technology Campus)

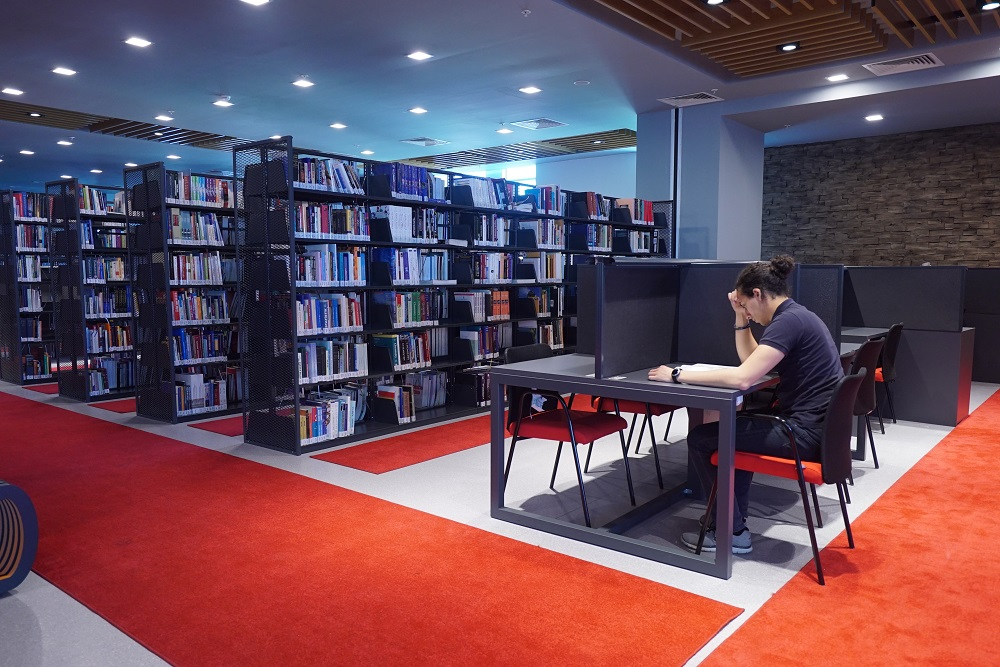
Altinbas University Library with 56.553 publications, over 1.350.000 electronic books and journals.

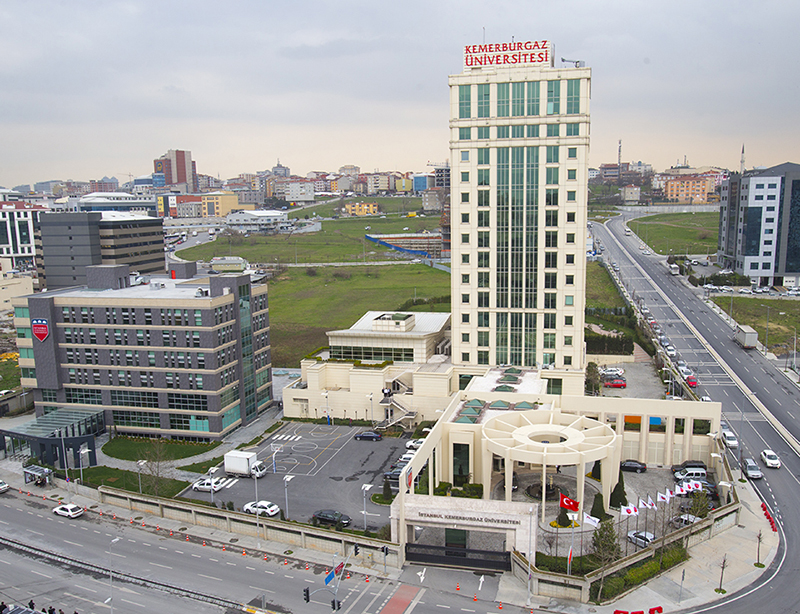
Address: Mahmutbey Mahallesi, Dilmenler Caddesi Mahmutbey Yerleşkesi No:26, 34218 Bağcılar/İstanbul

== See Also ==
- YÖK Council of Higher Education (Turkey)
- Altinbas University for International Students
- Altinbas University Ranking
