= Bağcılar =

District in İstanbul, Turkey

- District and municipality
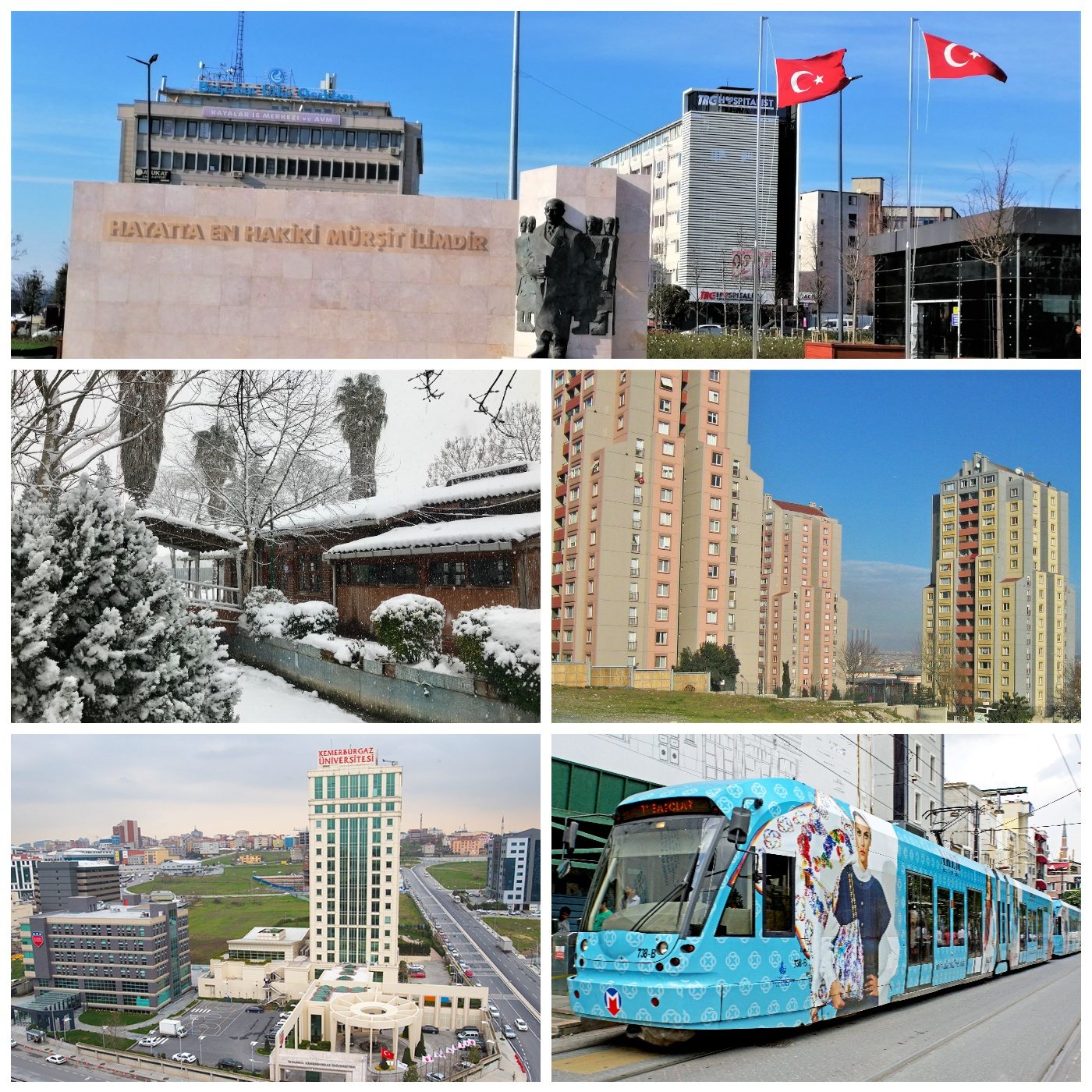
- From top to bottom: Bağcılar Square • Molla Gürani Park in winter • Eston Kirazlı Apartment Buildings • Altınbaş University • T1 Kabataş-Bağcılar Tram

- Logo

- Map showing Bağcılar District in Istanbul Province

- Location within Turkey Location within Istanbul
- Coordinates: 41°02′04″N 28°51′23″E
- Country: Turkey
- Province: Istanbul

Government
  - Mayor: Yasin Yıldız (AKP)
- Area: 23 km^{2} (8.9 sq mi)
- Population (2022): 740,069
  - Density: 32,000/km^{2} (83,000/sq mi)
- Time zone: UTC+3 (TRT)
- Postal code: 34200
- Area code: 0212
- Website: www.bagcilar.bel.tr

Bağcılar is a municipality and district of Istanbul Province, Turkey. Its area is 23 km^{2}, and its population is 740,069 (2022). It is located on the European side of Istanbul, near the city centre, just north of Bahçelievler, between the two major ring roads, TEM and D100 (formerly E5). The district is the fourth most populous in the Istanbul Municipality. Bağcılar developed rapidly between the 1970s and 1990s and is primarily residential in nature. The neighborhood is served by the Istanbul Metro and the T1 line of the Istanbul Tram. The mayor is Yasin Yıldız from the Justice and Development Party, elected in January 2025.

== Etymology ==
The area is presumed to have been inhabited in Byzantine times under the name Drypia, as a rural suburb of Constantinople. The name Bağcılar was given due to the abundance of vineyards. The name bağcılar means "vine growers" in Turkish. The district used to be known as Yeşilbağ, which translates to "green vineyard". The name was changed to Yeşilbağ when Bağcılar became a town and the name Bağcılar was given again when Bağcılar became a district. The old name of Bagcilar, which was largely populated by non-Muslim people in the Ottoman period, was Çıfıtburgaz (Yahudburgaz).

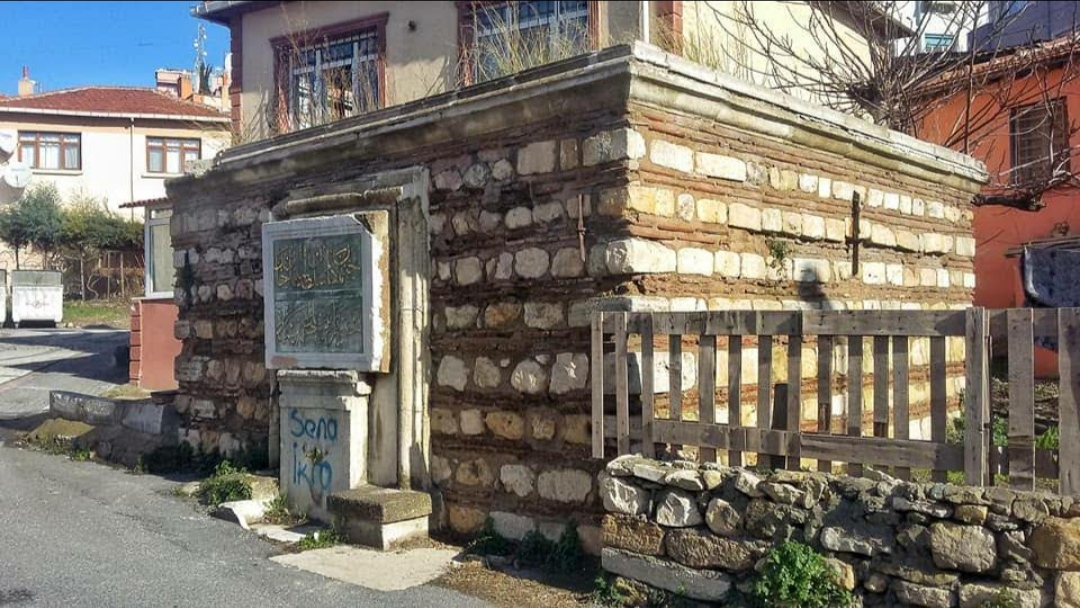
Mahmutbey Sultan Süleyman Han Burmalı Fountain

== History ==
=== Ottoman period ===
The area of Bağcılar encompassed sparsely populated countryside during the time of the Ottoman Empire until the time of the founding of the Republic of Turkey. Osman II constructed a mosque approximately 400 years ago in an area which is today the center of the district. There is a second 400-year-old mosque built by Osman II which is located on the border of neighboring Güngören.

Archeological teams and builders have been known to discover historical artifacts while working in Bağcılar. There are aqueducts located in the military area of the Bağcılar district which were once in charge of meeting the water needs of Istanbul. One of the oldest historical structures in Bağcılar is the historical fountain located in the Mahmutbey neighborhood. These fountains were built by the Ottoman sultans in various parts of Istanbul at the time. In 2023, a chapel has been discovered which has been built by the Greeks most probably during the 1800.

=== Republican era ===
Nearer to the Turkish War of Independence, Bağcılar was one of the villages of Mahmutbey where the Greek population lived during the Ottoman period. This population worked in the areas lush vineyards.

Mahmutbey was one of the oldest settlements in Istanbul and was a settlement center to which 11 small villages were attached. Six of these villages appear in a work titled "Istanbul City Statistical Yearbook 1930-31" by the Istanbul Metropolitan Municipality. The villages were called Avaz, Ayapa, Ayayorgi, Çıfitburgaz, Vidoz and Yenibosna. In the 1950s, Mahmutbey had a village mansion with gendarmerie station, health center, pharmacy, post office, cinema, guesthouse, and a small municipal office.

The first urbanization phase of Bağcılar started near what is today Bağcılar Square. The first wave of urbanization was experienced in the Merkez and Yenigün neighborhoods of Bağcılar, which were closest to the Istanbul city centre and Bakırköy districts. Being close to the city center and Bakırköy district of Istanbul, this area was completely parceled out by formal and informal builders and renamed Parseller in the 1980s. The Yenigün Neighborhood, which is currently the most densely populated neighborhood of Bağcılar, is considered to be the first and oldest urban neighborhood in the district.

Urbanization rapidly spread to other parts of Bağcılar causing a redrawing of maps which created the separate urban district of Bakırköy. Bağcılar continues to be known as a district known for rapid population growth and poor or informal urban planning. The presence of informally built apartment blocks remains a major concern for planning officials due to Istanbul's high earthquake risk. In an attempt to reduce the risk of a mass casualty event as a result of a major earthquake, the Istanbul Metropolitan Municipality has undertaken several major housing development initiatives. In 1989, the M1 line of the Istanbul Metro was extended to and terminates at Bağcılar. Later in 1992, the Istanbul Tram was extended to Bağcılar Square. The area is also extensively served by Istanbul's bus system.

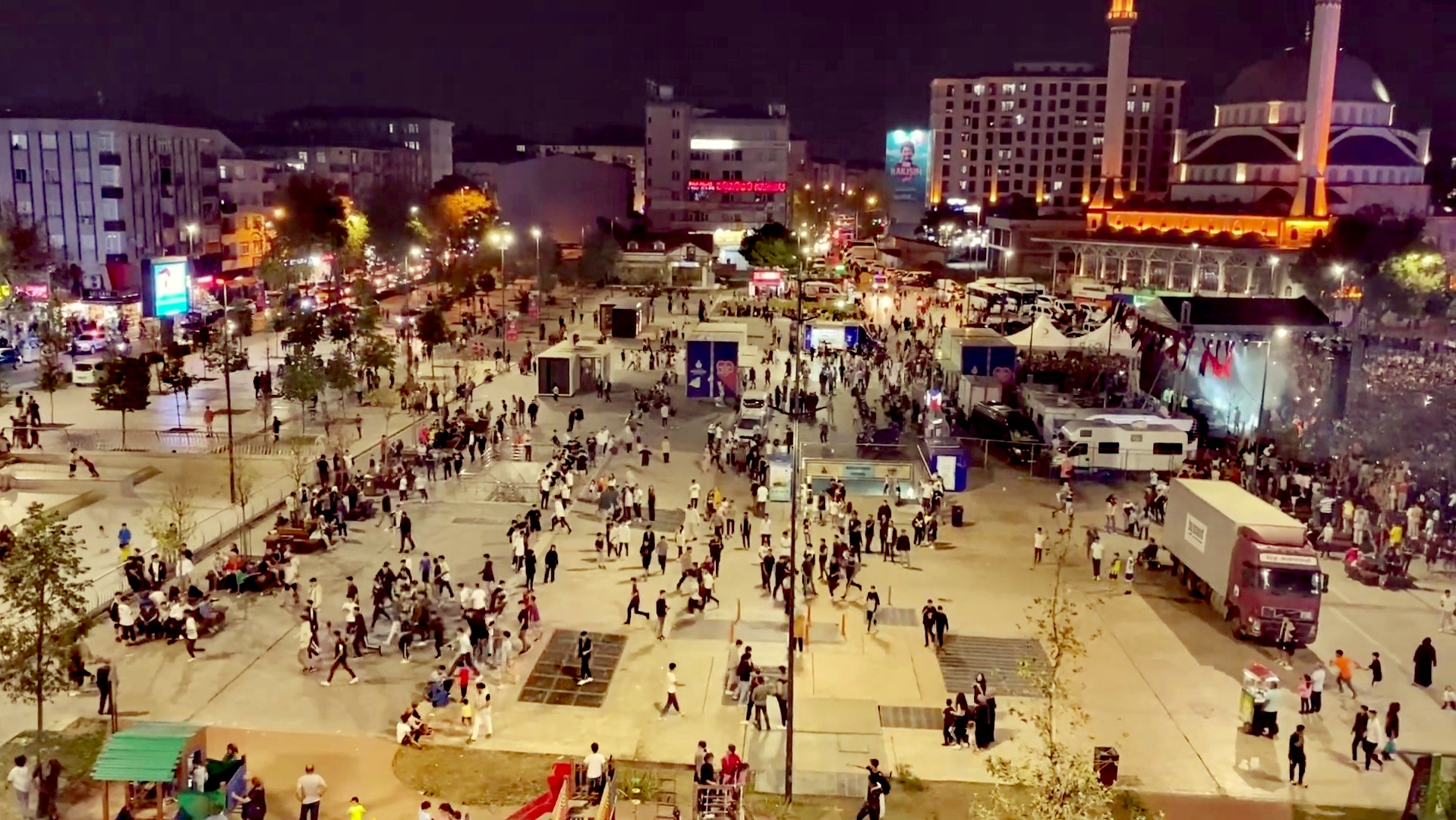
Bağcılar Square

== Geography ==
Bağcılar is located on the European side of Istanbul, within the service boundaries of Istanbul Metropolitan Municipality. Its area is 22 km^{2} (8.5 sq mi). The district is now known as an immigrant quarter. It lies between E-5 and TEM. In the south Bahçelievler, in the west Küçükçekmece, in the northwest Başakşehir, in the east Güngören, in the north Esenler, Esenler and Başakşehir. lands exist. It has no coastline. Bağcılar is situated on a flat and wavy plateau which varies in elevation between 50 and 130 meters.

Bağcılar is a primarily residential district composed of 5-6 story concrete frame structures with balconies and red tile roofs. The district is largely defined by informal paved roadways which struggle with issues like traffic congestion and flooding. The area also houses a great deal of industry, particularly light engineering, textiles, printing, a wholesale market for dry goods, a large second-hand car market, and many trucking companies. Most of the industrial land uses in the district are located along the Gunesli link road from the TEM motorway to Istanbul airport.

== Composition ==
There are 22 neighbourhoods in Bağcılar District:

- 100. Yıl
- 15 Temmuz
- Bağlar
- Barbaros
- Çınar
- Demirkapı
- Fatih
- Fevzi Çakmak
- Göztepe
- Güneşli
- Hürriyet
- İnönü
- Kazım Karabekir
- Kemalpaşa
- Kirazlı
- Mahmutbey
- Merkez
- Sancaktepe
- Yavuz Selim
- Yenigün
- Yenimahalle
- Yıldıztepe

== Public transportation ==
Bağcılar is one of the most developed districts in Istanbul in terms of public transportation. It is connected to Yenikapı by the M1ʙ subway line. It is connected to Başakşehir by the M3 subway line, Mecidiyeköy by the M7 subway line. Moreover, the T1 tram line leads from Bağcılar to Kabataş. Many subway lines in the project also pass through the district. Beside those, the district has several bus options as well.

== Culture ==
People under the age of 22 make up 33% of the population in Bağcılar. Despite having a high primary school enrollment rate, there remains a persistent shortage of school capacity as there are many immigrant families who are not registered to live in Turkey. There are 118,250 students in primary and high schools in Bağcılar. Altınbaş University is located in Bağcılar. There is a public library near the Mahmutbey (Istanbul Metro) station. In addition to this facility, smaller libraries have been established in 22 neighborhoods of the district. There are a total of 16 Information Houses, the first of which was opened in 2008, that can support the education of children between the ages of 8 and 14.

The Bağcılar Cultural Center was established to assist cultural activities in the district. The cultural center also includes a library with a capacity of 20,000 books, sports halls, cinema-conference halls and indoor sports halls. The absence of sufficient green and recreational areas in the district remains a major quality of life issue. There are 0.35 km^{2} (0.14 sq mi) per person in terms of parks and children's playgrounds in the district.

Per Istanbul Municipal statistics, there are 2796 streets/streets, 88 mosques, 12 high schools and equivalent schools, 101 primary schools, 17 private schools, 22 neighborhoods, one training and research hospital, 41 family health centers, one metropolitan health center, seven private hospitals, 23 private clinic centers, two tuberculosis control centers, 1 mother-child health center, one health counseling center and four municipal cultural centers.

=== Local elections ===
Bağcılar has recently been a strong hold for the AK Party. The party controls most government seats in the district and President Recep Tayyip Erdoğan remains popular. The area was once populated primarily by conservative Anatolian residents but is increasingly home to large populations of Syrians and Afghans. Bağcılar is considered to be a religiously conservative district in Istanbul.

Bağcılar Mayors and Their Parties
Year	Mayor	Party	Vote Rate
1992*	Feyzullah Kıyıklık	RP	35.09%
1994	Feyzullah Kıyıklık	RP	37.30%
1999	Feyzullah Kıyıklık	FP	37.74%
2004*	Feyzullah Kıyıklık	AK Party	43.91%
2009	Lokman Çağrıcı	AK Party	49.39%
2014	Lokman Çağrıcı	AK Party	57.20%
2019	Lokman Çağrıcı	AK Party	57.89%
2024	Abdullah Özdemir	AK Party	55.42%

- After Bağcılar left Bakırköy in 1992, Feyzullah Kıyıklık was elected mayor in the by-elections.
- Feyzullah Kıyıklık resigned to become a member of parliament 2007 Turkish general election and handed over the task to Lokman Çağırıcı.
- With the resignation of Lokman Çağrıcı in 2022, Abdullah Özdemir was elected as the mayor instead.
- With Abdullah Özdemir being assigned to the position of the provincial chairman of the Justice and Development Party of Istanbul, Yasin Yıldız was elected as the mayor instead by the municipal council.

== Twin towns – sister cities ==
Bağcılar is twinned with:

=== International ===
- Lubnin, Poland
- Kragujevac, Serbia
- Mamuša, Kosovo
- Jeti-Ögüz District, Kyrgyzstan
- Serai Naurang (Lakki Marwat), Pakistan
- Dannieh District, Lebanon
- Berat, Albania
- Çorovodë, Albania
