= Yazar =

Yazar is a Turkish surname. Notable people with the name include:

- Ceyhun Yazar (born 1992), Turkish footballer
- Gönül Yazar (born 1936), Turkish singer and actress
- Saffet Gurur Yazar (born 1987), Turkish footballer
