= Zilgibis =

Ruler of the North Caucasian Huns

Zilgibis (fl. 520) was a ruler of the North Caucasian Huns.

He received gifts from the Byzantine emperor Justin I, with whom he made a treaty against Sassanid Persia. However, the Sassanid king Kavad I also sent an embassy to him, and he also made a treaty with him. He eventually opted to side with the Persians, sending 20,000 troops to their aid. Upon hearing this, Justin informed Kavad that Zilgibis had also sworn allegiance to him. He advised them to become friends. Kavad agreed and had the Hun king and his troops killed.
