= Otto Harrassowitz =

German book seller and publisher

Otto Wilhelm Harrassowitz (18 December 1845 in La Guayra, Venezuela – 24 June 1920 in Gaschwitz near Leipzig) was a German book seller and publisher.

His business, Otto Harrassowitz GmbH & Co. KG, became an important book vendor for academic and research libraries beginning in the 19th century, and survives in that role today. A subsidiary, Harrassowitz Verlag (Harrassowitz Publishing House), is an academic publishing company.

== See also ==
- Carl Anton Baumstark
- Oriens Christianus
