= Saffet Gurur Yazar =

Turkish footballer

Personal information
- Full name: Saffet Gurur Yazar
- Date of birth: April 16, 1987 (age 39)
- Place of birth: İzmir, Turkey
- Height: 1.87 m (6 ft 1 1/2 in)
- Position: Centre back

Team information
- Current team: Artvin Hopaspor

Youth career
- 1999–2005: Karşıyaka

Senior career*
Years	Team	Apps	(Gls)
2005–2011	Karşıyaka	79	(6)
2011–2012	Samsunspor	1	(0)
2013	Karşıyaka	8	(0)
2013–2014	Altay	19	(0)
2014–2015	Nazilli Belediyespor	21	(0)
2015–2016	Ankara Demirspor	26	(2)
2016–2017	Aydınspor 1923	9	(0)
2017–2018	Kırklarelispor	42	(2)
2018–2019	Diyarbakırspor	16	(0)
2019	Nevşehir Belediyespor	12	(0)
2019–	Artvin Hopaspor	0	(0)

International career
2011	Turkey A2	3	(1)
- * Club domestic league appearances and goals as of 17:58, 6 August 2019 (UTC)

Saffet Gurur Yazar (born 16 April 1987) is a Turkish professional footballer who currently plays as a centre back for Artvin Hopaspor.
