= Turkic tribal confederations =

Historical term for "military division, clan, or tribe" among the Turkic peoples

The Turkic term oğuz or oğur (in z- and r-Turkic, respectively) is a historical term for "military division, clan, or tribe" among the Turkic peoples. With the Mongol invasions of 1206–21, the Turkic khaganates were replaced by Mongol or hybrid Turco-Mongol confederations, where the corresponding military division came to be known as orda.

== Background ==
The 8th-century Kul Tigin stela has the earliest instance of the term in Old Turkic epigraphy: Toquz Oghuz, the "nine tribes".

Later the word appears often for two largely separate groups of the Turkic migration in the early medieval period, namely:

- Onogur ("ten tribes")
- Utigurs
- Kutrigurs
- Uyghur
- Saragurs

The stem uq-, oq- "kin, tribe" is from a Proto-Turkic *uk. The Old Turkic word has often been connected with oq "arrow"; Pohl (2002) in explanation of this connection adduces the Chinese T'ang-shu chronicle, which reports: "the khan divided his realm into ten tribes. To the leader of each tribe, he sent an arrow. The name [of these ten leaders] was 'the ten she', but they were also called 'the ten arrows'." An oguz (ogur) was in origin a military division of a Nomadic empire, which acquired tribal or ethnic connotations, by processes of ethnogenesis.

== See also ==
- Turkic peoples
- Oghur Turks
- Oghuz Turks
- Huns
- Xiongnu
- Khaganate
- Turkic migration
- Orda (organization)
