= Ishad =

Ishad was an Old Turkic word used to designate the highest-ranking Göktürk generals (e.g., Buri-sad). It is also used in some Arabic sources to describe the Khagan Bek of the Khazars. Brook, citing Golden, proposes that Ishad is a variant of Shad, a Turkic title of Iranian origin.
