= Kündür =

According to ibn Fadlan, the Kündür (also Kundur Qagan) was an official in the Khazar government under the command of the Khagan Bek. Ibn Fadlan did not describe the duties of this officer, nor does any extant source. The Magyars had a dual-kingship system in which power was divided between a gyula and a kende; therefore it has been hypothesized that the kündür was a client-ruler of Hungarian remnants who remained in the Pontic steppe during the 10th century. Alternatively, it has been suggested that the title may derive from an Old Turkic word for law, and that the kündür may have been a judicial officer, possibly the head of the Khazar judiciary. Noting that kündü only exists in Siberian Turkic where it means "awe, politeness, reverence, regale", Peter B. Golden proposes that Turkic kündü is borrowed from Mongolic *kündü- (> Middle Mongol kündü > Khalkha хүнд hünd, meaning "heavy"). Additionally, modern Azerbaijani hündür "high; tall" is very likely to have been borrowed from Ilkhanid Mongolian that might have become öndö "high" in modern Mongolian.

== Sources ==
- Kevin Alan Brook. The Jews of Khazaria. 2nd ed. Rowman & Littlefield Publishers, Inc, 2006.
- Douglas M. Dunlop, The History of the Jewish Khazars, Princeton, N.J.: Princeton University Press, 1954.
- Peter B. Golden. "Khazarica: Notes on Some Khazar Terms", in Turkic Languages, ed. Lars Johanson, Harrassowitz Verlag, 2005.
- Klyashtorny, S. G. (November 1997). "About One Khazar Title in the Old Turkic Inscriptions" (PDF). Manuscripta Orientalia. 3 (3): 22–23. ISSN 1238-5018.
