= Turan, Azerbaijan =

Turan
- Location within Azerbaijan Location within Shaki-Zagatala Economic Region
- Coordinates: 40°51′33″N 47°14′31″E
- Country: Azerbaijan
- Rayon: Shaki

Population
  - Total: 1,796
- Time zone: UTC+4 (AZT)
  - Summer (DST): UTC+5 (AZT)

Turan (known as Orconikidze until 1999) is a village and municipality in the Shaki Rayon of Azerbaijan. It has a population of 1,796.
