= Zabergan =

Chieftain of the Kutrigurs

Zabergan (Medieval Greek: Ζαβεργάν) was the chieftain of the Kutrigurs, a Turkic nomadic tribe of the Pontic–Caspian steppe, after Sinnion. His name is Iranian, meaning full moon. Either under pressure from incoming Avars, or in revolt against the Byzantine Empire, in the winter of 558, he led a large Kutrigur army that crossed the frozen Danube. The army was divided into three sections: one raided south far as Thermopylae, while two others the Thracian Chersonesus and the periphery of Constantinople. In March 559 Zabergan attacked Constantinople, and one part of his forces consisted of 7,000 horsemen, but Belisarius defeated him at the Battle of Melantias and he was forced to withdraw.

The transit of such big distances in a short period of time shows that the Kutrigurs were mounted warriors, and Zabergan's raiders were already encamped near the banks of the Danube. However, once again Emperor Justinian I (r. 527–565) managed to persuade the Utigur chieftain Sandilch to attack the Kutrigurs, which resulted in the decimation of both. Nevertheless, according to the 12th-century chronicle of Michael the Syrian the remnant of those Bulgars were granted Dacia in the time of Maurice (r. 582-602). It is unknown if Zabergan was related to the Byzantine general named Zabergan, who in 586 defended the fortress Chlomaron against the Romans.

== Honours ==
Zabergan Peak in Antarctica is named after Zabergan.

== Sources ==
- Curta, Florin (2015). "Avar Blitzkrieg, Slavic and Bulgar raiders, and Roman special ops: mobile warriors in the 6th-century Balkans". In Zimonyi István; Osman Karatay (eds.). Eurasia in the Middle Ages. Studies in Honour of Peter B. Golden. Wiesbaden: Otto Harrassowitz. pp. 69–89.
- Golden, Peter Benjamin (1992). An introduction to the History of the Turkic peoples: ethnogenesis and state formation in medieval and early modern Eurasia and the Middle East. Wiesbaden: Otto Harrassowitz. ISBN 9783447032742.
- Golden, Peter B. (2011). Studies on the Peoples and Cultures of the Eurasian Steppes. Editura Academiei Române; Editura Istros a Muzeului Brăilei. ISBN 9789732721520.
- Maenchen-Helfen, Otto J. (1973). "Chapter IX. Language: 5. Iranian names". The World of the Huns: Studies in Their History and Culture. University of California Press. p. 392. ISBN 9780520015968.

Preceded by Sinnion	Leader of the Kutrigurs fl. 558–586	Succeeded by Bulgarios
