= Marcel Erdal =

German linguist and Turkologist (born 1945)

- Born: 8 July 1945 (age 81)

Marcel Erdal (born 8 July 1945) is a linguist and Turkologist. He is Head of the Turcology department at the Goethe University in Frankfurt. He graduated from Istanbul's Robert College in 1963.

== Publications ==
- The Turkic Nagy-Szent-Miklos Inscription in Greek Letters, 1988
- Old Turkic Word Formation: A Functional Approach to the Lexicon, 1991
- Die Sprache der wolgabolgarischen Inschriften, 1993
- A Grammar of Old Turkic, 2004
