= Anastasian Wall =

Defensive wall in Thrace

- Ἀναστάσειον Τεῖχος (Ancient Greek); Anastáseion Teîchos (Ancient Greek); Anastasius Suru (Turkish)
- Long Walls of Thrace
- Map showing the course of the wall

- Location within Turkey
- 41°12′0″N 28°20′0″E
- Type: Defensive wall
- Periods: Early Medieval
- Location: Istanbul, Turkey
- Region: Thrace

Site notes
- Height: 5 m (16 ft)
- Length: 56 km (35 mi)
- Width: 3.3 m (11 ft)

The Anastasian Wall (Ancient Greek: Ἀναστάσειον Τεῖχος, Anastáseion Teîchos; Turkish: Anastasius Suru) or the Long Walls of Thrace (Greek: Μακρὰ Τείχη τῆς Θράκης, Makrà Teíchē tês Thrákēs) or simply the Long Wall (Ancient Greek: Μακρὸν τεῖχος; Turkish: Uzun Duvar) is an ancient stone and turf fortification located 64 km (40 mi) west of Constantinople, built by the Eastern Roman Empire during the late 5th century.

== Construction ==
Originally some 56 km (35 mi) long, it stretches from Evcik İskelesi in Çatalca at the Black Sea coast across the Thracian peninsula to the coast of the Sea of Marmara at 6 km (3.7 mi) west of Silivri (ancient Selymbria). It ran from north to south through the locations that are today Karacaköy Merkez, Gümüşpınar, Pınarca, Kurfallı, Silivri, Fener, and Alipaşa, Silivri. Remains of the wall are visible in Gümüşpınar junction in Karacaköy, Hisartepe in Yalıköy, Pınarca in İhsaniye and Kurfallı village. The wall was part of an additional outer defense system for Constantinople, capital of the Eastern Roman Empire and probably continued in use until the 7th century.

The wall was named after the Emperor Anastasius I (r. 491–518). Scholarly opinion on the date of its construction is divided, with some, such as Brian Croke, arguing that it was indeed built by Anastasius, while others, such as Michael Whitby, advocate the older view that Anastasius merely refurbished it. There is evidence that the fortification already existed in 469 during the reign of Leo I (r. 457–474) and in 478 in the era of Zeno (r. 476–491), and that it was maintained and renewed by Anastasius from 507 to 512. The wall had a thickness of 3.3 m (11 ft) and a height over 5 m (16 ft). It was built complete with towers, gates, forts, ditches and a military way to protect Constantinople from invasions from the west by Huns, Slavs and Bulgars. A rectangular castrum with dimensions of 250 m (820 ft) by 300 m (980 ft) existed in the central section of the wall.

== Effectiveness ==
It is known that the wall had only a limited effectiveness, and various groups attacking Constantinople penetrated it many times, because the fortification's length made it difficult to defend the wall completely by a limited garrison, and also because the wall was not sufficiently strong due to its hasty construction.

The wall fell into ruin after it was abandoned in the 7th century because of the difficulty of keeping it manned and repaired. Over the centuries, the stone of more than half of the total length was reused in other local buildings. It is best preserved in the woodlands of the northern sector.

== See also ==
- Walls of Constantinople
- List of walls
- Çakmak Line, An abandoned Turkish defensive line for similar aims

== Sources ==
- Schuchhardt, C. (1901), "Die Anastasius-Mauer bei Constantinopel und die Dobrudcha-Wälle", Jahrbuch des Kaiserlich Deutschen Arhäologischen Instituts (in German), XVI: 107–127
- Crow, J.G. (1995), "The Long Walls of Thrace", in Mango, Cyril; Dagron, Gilbert (eds.), Constantinople and its Hinterland: Papers from the Twenty-seventh Spring Symposium on Byzantine Studies, Oxford, April 1993, Variorum, pp. 109–124, ISBN 0-86078-487-8
- Crow, J.G.; Ricci, A. (1997), "Investigating the hinterland of Constantinople: interim report on the Anastasian Long Wall", Journal of Roman Archaeology, 10: 253–288
