= Sandilch =

6th century Utigurs leader

Sandilch (Σάνδιλ, Σάνδιλχος; Turkic: "boat") was a chieftain of the Utigurs in the 6th century. The origin of the name is probably Hunnic. Although he initially protested against leading the Utigurs into war against a related people, the Kutrigurs, the Byzantine Emperor Justinian I (527–565) convinced him to do so through diplomatic persuasion and bribery. The Utigurs led by Sandilch attacked the Kutrigurs, who suffered great losses.

Sandilch's own words:

"It is neither fair nor decent to exterminate our tribesmen (the Kutrigurs), who not only speak a language, identical to ours, who are our neighbours and have the same dressing and manners of life, but who are also our relatives, even though subjected to other lords".

After decimating each other, the remnant of Zabergan's and Sandilch's Bulgars acquired Dacia during the reign of Emperor Maurice.

The 17th century Volga Bulgar compilation Ja'far Tarikh (a work of disputed authenticity) represents Boyan Chelbir (i.e., Sandilch) as the son of Bayan Tatra, and brother of Bulyak Bulgar (i.e. Balaq, see Sabirs). Further more Bayan Tatra is a son of Djurash Masgut, who is a son of Irnik (i.e., Ernak), son of Attila.

== Honours ==
Sandilh Point in Antarctica is named after Sandilch.

== See also ==
- Utigurs
- Kutrigurs

== Bibliography ==
- Golden, Peter Benjamin (1992). An introduction to the History of the Turkic peoples: ethnogenesis and state formation in medieval and early modern Eurasia and the Middle East. Wiesbaden: Otto Harrassowitz. ISBN 9783447032742.
- Golden, Peter B. (2011). Studies on the Peoples and Cultures of the Eurasian Steppes. Editura Academiei Române; Editura Istros a Muzeului Brăilei. ISBN 9789732721520.
