= Kutrigurs =

Historical ethnic group in Caucasus

The Kutrigurs were a Turkic nomadic equestrian tribe who flourished on the Pontic–Caspian steppe in the 6th century AD. To their east were the similar Utigurs; both may have been closely related to the Bulgars. The Kutrigeers warred with the Byzantine Empire and the Utigurs. Towards the end of the 6th century, they were absorbed by the Pannonian Avars under pressure from other Turkic groups.

== Etymology ==
The name Kutrigur, also recorded as Kwrtrgr, Κουτρίγουροι, Κουτούργουροι, Κοτρίγουροι, Κοτρίγοροι, Κουτρίγοροι, Κοτράγηροι, Κουτράγουροι, Κοτριαγήροι, has been suggested as a metathesized form of Turkic *Toqur-Oğur, with *quturoğur meaning "nine Oğur (tribes)". David Marshall Lang derived it from Turkic kötrügür ("conspicuous, eminent, renowned"). Few scholars support theories deriving the Kutrigurs from the Guti/Quti and the Utigurs from the Udi/Uti, of ancient Southwest Asia and the Caucasus respectively, posited by Osman Karatay. Similarly, few considr Duč'i, a term for the Bulgars (some read Kuchi), as a root of Kutrigur, as posited by Josef Markwart.

== History ==
René Grousset thought that the Kutrigurs were remnants of the Huns. Procopius recounts:

in the old days many Huns, (Note: The ethnonym of the Huns, like those of Scythians and Türks, became a generic term for steppe-people (nomads) and invading enemies from the East, no matter of their actual origin and identity. However, this remains controversial.) called then Cimmerians, inhabited the lands I mentioned already. They all had a single king. Once one of their kings had two sons: one called Utigur and another called Kutrigur. After their father's death they shared the power and gave their names to the subjected peoples, so that even nowadays some of them are called Utigurs and the others - Kutrigurs.

They occupied the Tanaitic–Maeotic (Don–Azov) steppe zone, the Kutrigurs in the western part and the Utrigurs towards the east. This story was also confirmed by the words of the Utigur ruler Sandilch:

It is neither fair nor decent to exterminate our tribesmen (the Kutrigurs), who not only speak a language, identical to ours, who are our neighbours and have the same dressing and manners of life, but who are also our relatives, even though subjected to other lords".

Agathias Scholasticus, Greek poet and the principal historian of part of the reign of the Roman emperor Justinian I recalls the origin of their name as follows:

In ancient times the Huns inhabited the region east of lake Maeotis to the north of the river Don, as did the rest of the barbarian peoples established in Asia on the near side of Mount Imaeus. All these peoples were referred to by the general name of Scythians or Huns, whereas individual tribes had their own particular names, rooted in ancestral tradition, such as Cotrigurs, Utigurs, Ultizurs, Bourougounds and so on and so forth.

The Syriac translation of Pseudo-Zacharias Rhetor's Ecclesiastical History (c. 555) of Western Eurasia records 13 tribes: the wngwr (Onogur), wgr (Oğur), sbr (Sabir), bwrgr (Burğar, i.e. Bulgars), kwrtrgr (Kutriğurs), br (probably Abar, i.e. Avars), ksr (Kasr; Akatziri?), srwrgwr (Saragurs), dyrmr (*[I]di[r]mar? < Ιτιμαροι), b'grsyq (Bagrasik, i.e. Barsils), kwls (Khalyzians?), bdl (Abdali?), and ftlyt (Hephthalite). They are described in typical phrases used for nomads in the ethnographic literature of the period, as people who "live in tents, earn their living on the meat of livestock and fish, of wild animals and by their weapons (plunder)".

=== War with the Byzantines ===
In the late 6th century, Agathias wrote of the western steppe peoples:

... all of them are called in general Scythians and Huns and in particular according to their nation. Thus, some are Kotrigouroi or Outigouroi and yet others are Oultizouroi and Bourougoundoi [... who] were known up to the time of the Emperor Leo and the Romans of that time and appeared to have been strong. We, however, in this day, neither know them, nor, I think, will we. Perhaps, they have perished or perhaps they have moved off to very far places.

In 551, a 12,000-strong Kutrigur army led by many commanders, including Chinialon, came from the "western side of the Maeotic Lake" to assist the Gepids, who were at the war with the Lombards. Later, with the Gepids, they plundered Byzantine lands. Emperor Justinian I (527–565), through diplomatic persuasion and bribery, tricked the Kutrigurs and Utigurs into mutual warfare. Utigurs led by Sandilch attacked the Kutrigurs, who suffered great losses.

The Kutrigurs made a peace treaty with the Byzantine Empire, and 2,000 Kutrigurs on horseback, accompanied by their wives and children and led by Sinnion, entered imperial service and were settled in Thrace. Sandilch viewed this friendly treatment of those Kutrigurs negatively.

In the winter of 558, the remaining Kutrigur army led by Zabergan crossed the frozen Danube and divided into three sections: one raided south as far as Thermopylae, one in the Thracian Chersonesus, and one in the periphery of Constantinople. In March 559, Zabergan attacked Constantinople with forces that included 7,000 horsemen. The transit of such distances in a short period of time shows that they were mounted warriors. In contrast to Chinialon's army, Zabergan's raiders had already been encamped near the banks of the Danube.

Although Procopius, Agathias, and Menander Protector deemed the Kutrigurs and Utigurs a threat to the stability of the Byzantine Empire, ultimately the two peoples decimated one another. Some Kutrigur remnants were swept away by the Avars to Pannonia. By 569 the Κοτζαγηροί (Kotzagiroi, possibly Kutrigurs), Ταρνιάχ (Tarniach), and Ζαβενδὲρ (Zabender) had fled to the Avars from the Türks. Avar Khagan Bayan I in 568 ordered 10,000 so-called Kutrigur Huns to cross the Sava river. The Utigurs remained in the Pontic steppe and fell under the rule of the Türks.

Between 630 and 635, Khan Kubrat managed to unite the Onogur Bulgars with the tribes of the Kutrigurs and Utigurs under a single rule, creating a powerful confederation that medieval authors in Western Europe referred to as Old Great Bulgaria, or Patria Onoguria. According to some scholars, it is more correctly called the Onogundur-Bulgar Empire.
