= Utigurs =

Historical ethnical group

Utigurs were Turkic nomadic equestrians who flourished in the Pontic–Caspian steppe in the 6th century AD. They possibly were closely related to the Kutrigurs and Bulgars.

== Etymology ==
The name Ut(r)igur, recorded as Οὺτ(τ)ρίγουροι, Οὺτούργουροι and Οὺτρίγου, is generally considered as a metathesized form suggested by Gyula Németh of Turkic *Otur-Oğur, thus the *Uturğur mean "Thirty Oğurs (tribes)". Lajos Ligeti proposed utur- (to resist), while Louis Bazin uturkar (the victors-conquerors), Quturgur and qudurmaq (the enrages).

There has been little scholarly support for theories linking the names Kutrigur and Utigur to peoples such as the Guti/Quti and/or Udi/Uti, of Ancient Southwest Asia and the Caucasus respectively, which have been posited by scholars such as Osman Karatay, and Yury Zuev. No evidence has been presented that the Guti moved from their homeland in the Zagros Mountains (modern Iran/Iraq) to the Steppes, and they are believed to have spoken a language different from known languages. The Udi were mentioned by Pliny the Elder (Natural History, VI, book, 39), in connection with the Aorsi (sometimes jointly as the Utidorsi), the Sarmatians and a Scythian caste/tribe known as the Aroteres ("Cultivators"), who lived "above the maritime coast of [Caucasian] Albania and the ... Udini" on the western shores of the Caspian Sea. Neither is there general acceptance of Edwin G. Pulleyblank's suggestion that the Utigurs may be linked to the Yuezhi – an Indo-European people that settled in Western China during ancient times.

== History ==
The origin of relative tribes Utigurs and Kutrigurs is obscure. Procopius wrote that "Beyond the Sagins dwell many Hunnish (Note: The ethnonym of the Huns, like those of Scythians and Türks, became a generic term for steppe-people (nomads) and invading enemies from the East, no matter of their actual origin and identity.) tribes. The land is called Evlisia and barbarians populate the sea-coast and the inland up to the so-called lake of Meotida and the river Tanais. The people living there were called Cimmerians, and now they are called Utigurs. North of them are the populous tribes of the Antes." They occupied the Don-Azov steppe zone, the Kutrigurs in the Western part and the Utigurs towards the East.

Procopius also recorded a genealogical legend according to which:

...in the old days many Huns, called then Cimmerians, inhabited the lands I mentioned already. They all had a single king. Once one of their kings had two sons: one called Utigur and another called Kutrigur. After their father's death they shared the power and gave their names to the subjected peoples, so that even nowadays some of them are called Utigurs and the others - Kutrigurs.

This story was also confirmed by the words of the Utigur ruler Sandilch, "it is neither fair nor decent to exterminate our tribesmen (the Kutrigurs), who not only speak a language, identical to ours, who are our neighbours and have the same dressing and manners of life, but who are also our relatives, even though subjected to other lords".

Agathias (c. 579–582) wrote:

..all of them are called in general Scythians and Huns in particular according to their nation. Thus, some are Koutrigours or Outigours and yet others are Oultizurs and Bourougounds... the Oultizurs and Bourougounds were known up to the time of the Emperor Leo (457–474) and the Romans of that time and appeared to have been strong. We, however, in this day, neither know them, nor, I think, will we. Perhaps, they have perished or perhaps they have moved off to very far place.

When the Kutrigurs invaded the lands of the Byzantine Empire, Emperor Justinian I (527–565) through diplomatic persuasion and bribery dragged the Kutrigurs and Utigurs into mutual warfare. The Utigurs led by Sandilch attacked the Kutrigurs, who suffered great losses. According to Procopius, Agathias and Menander, the Kutrigurs and Utigurs decimated one another, until they lost even their tribal names. Some Kutrigur remnants were swept away by the Avars to Pannonia, while the Utigurs remained in the Pontic steppe and fell under the rule of the Türks.

Their last mention was by Menander Protector, who recorded among the Türk forces that attacked Bosporos in 576 an Utigur army led by chieftain Ανάγαιος (Anagai, Anağay). Bosphoros fell to them c. 579 AD. In the same year, Byzantine embassy to the Türks passed through the territory of Ἀκκάγας (Akagas, Aq-Qağan), "which is the name of the woman who rules the Scythians there, having been appointed at that time by Anagai, chief of the tribe of the Utigurs".

== See also ==
- Kutrigurs
- Onogurs
- Bulgars
