= Harrassowitz Verlag =

German academic publishing house

- Founded: 1872; 153 years ago
- Founder: Otto Harrassowitz
- Country of origin: Germany
- Headquarters location: Wiesbaden
- Publication types: Books and academic journals
- Official website: www.harrassowitz-verlag.de

Harrassowitz Verlag is a German academic publishing house, based in Wiesbaden. It publishes about 250 scholarly books and periodicals per year on Oriental, Slavic, and Book and Library Studies. The publishing house is part of the company Otto Harrassowitz GmbH & Co. KG, founded by Otto Harrassowitz. Otto Harrassowitz GmbH & Co. KG is a book vendor for academic and research libraries, founded in Leipzig in 1872.
