= Peter Benjamin Golden =

American historian of Central Asia (born 1941)

Peter B. Golden
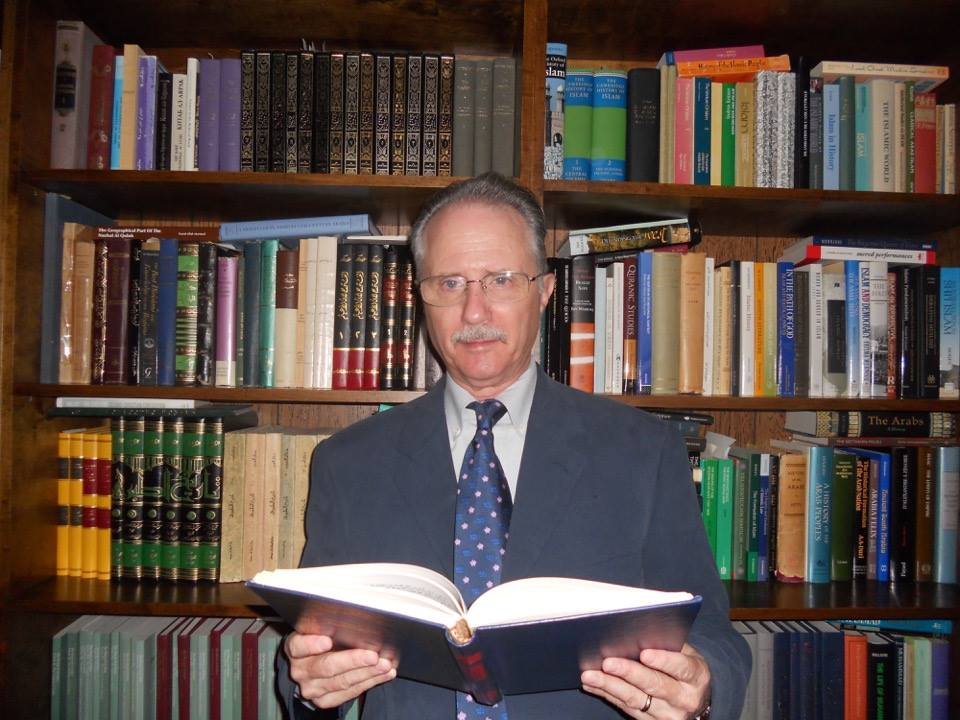
- Golden in 2015
- Born: 1941 (age 84–85)
- Occupation: Professor

Academic background
- Education: High School of Music & Art
- Alma mater: Queens College, CUNY (BA); Ankara University; Columbia University (MA, PhD)

Academic work
- Institutions: Rutgers University
- Main interests: Turkology; Near Eastern Studies; Middle Eastern Studies

Peter Benjamin Golden (born 1941) is an American professor emeritus of history, Turkish and Middle Eastern Studies at Rutgers University. He has written many books and articles on Turkic and Central Asian studies, such as An Introduction to the History of the Turkic Peoples.

Golden grew up in New York and attended Music & Art High School. He graduated from CUNY Queens College in 1963, before obtaining his M.A. and Ph.D. in History from Columbia University in 1968 and 1970, respectively. Golden also studied at the School of Language and History – Geography, Ankara University from 1967 to 1968. He taught at Rutgers University from 1969 until his retirement in 2012. He was Director of the Middle Eastern Studies Program at Rutgers from 2008 to 2011. He is an honorary member of the Turkish Language Association and Kőrösi Csoma Society of Hungarian Orientalists and was a member of the School of Historical Studies at the Institute for Advanced Study in Princeton from 2005 to 2006. In 2019, he was elected an honorary member of the Hungarian Academy of Sciences.

The historian Bulat L. Khamidullin considers Golden's body of work to have made an "enormous contribution" to the study of Turkic and Mongol history.

== Works ==
- (1980) Khazar studies: An Historico-philological Inquiry into the Origins of the Khazars, Budapest: Akadémiai Kiadó.
- (1992) An Introduction to the History of the Turkic Peoples: Ethnogenesis and State-Formation in Medieval and Early Modern Eurasia and the Middle East, Wiesbaden: Harrassowitz Verlag.
- (1998) Nomads and Sedentary Societies in Medieval Eurasia, Washington, D.C.: American Historical Association.
- (2000) The King's Dictionary. The Rasulid Hexaglot: Fourteenth Century Vocabularies in Arabic, Persian, Turkic, Greek, Armenian and Mongol, Leiden: Brill Publishers (book, edited, Vol. 4 in the series Handbuch der Orientalistik, 8. Abteilung Zentralasien).
- (2003) Nomads and their Neighbours in the Russian Steppe. Turks, Khazars and Qipchaqs, Aldershot, UK: Ashgate Publishing.
- Golden, Peter (2005). Хазары, евреи и славяне [Khazars, Jews and Slavey] (in Russian). Jerusalem and Moscow: Gesharim. ISBN 5-93273-196-6.
- (2007) The World of the Khazars: New Perspectives, co-edited with H. Ben-Shammai and A. Róna-Tas. Leiden: Brill Publishers.
- (2009) The Cambridge History of Inner Asia: The Chinggisid Age, co-edited with N. Di Cosmo, A.J. Frank, Cambridge: Cambridge University Press.
- (2010) Turks and Khazars: Origins, Institutions, and Interactions in Pre-Mongol Eurasia, Aldershot, UK: Ashgate Publishing.
- (2011) Studies on the Peoples and Cultures of the Eurasian Steppes, Bucharest–Brăila: Editura Academiei Române – Muzeul Brăilei Editura Istros.
- (2011) Central Asia in World History, Oxford–New York: Oxford University Press.

== Festschrift ==
- Osman Karatay, István Zimonyi, ed. (2016). Central Eurasia in the Middle Ages: Studies in Honor of Peter B. Golden. Harrassowitz. ISBN 978-3-447-10534-7.
