= Peter of Alexandria =

Peter of Alexandria may refer to:

- Pope Peter of Alexandria (disambiguation), seven Coptic popes from the year 300 to 1852
- Patriarch Peter of Alexandria (disambiguation), seven Greek Orthodox patriarchs from the year 300 to 2004
- Peter of Alexandria (chronicler)
