= Avar March =

Frontier province of the Frankish Empire

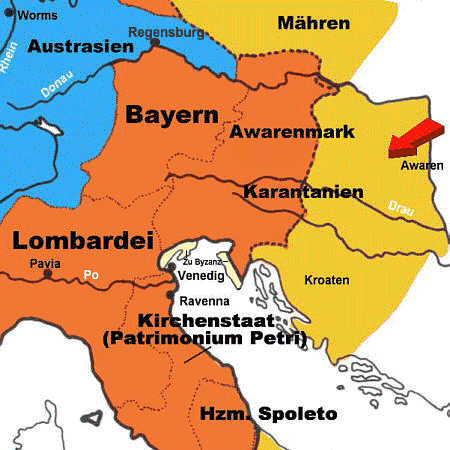
Southeastern Frankish territories, including the Avar March, at the beginning of the 9th century Frankish Austrasia in 774 Territories incorporated by 800 Dependent territories

The Avar March (Latin: Provincia Avarorum; German: Awarenmark) was a southeastern frontier province of the Frankish Empire, established after successful Frankish campaigns and conquests of Avarian territories along the river Danube, to the east from the river Enns, in what is today Lower Austria and northwestern Hungary. Since the Frankish conquest in the late 8th century, there were several administrative changes in those regions. Territory along the river Danube, from the river Enns to the Vienna Woods, was ruled directly, as a frontier extension (march) of the Frankish Bavaria, while regions further to the east, up to the river Rába, were initially designated to remaining Avarian princes, under the Frankish supreme rule. During the 820s and 830s, additional administrative changes were made in the wider region of Frankish Pannonia, inhabited mainly by Pannonian Slavs. Territories of the remaining Avarian princes were fully incorporated, and Avars eventually disappeared from the region.

Later during the 9th century, the region was contested between Eastern Frankish Kingdom and Great Moravia, while at the very beginning of the 10th century it was invaded and conquered by the Magyars. After the Battle of Lechfeld (955), territories along the river Danube, from the river Enns to the Vienna Woods, were reconquered by Germans, and new march was established (c. 972) thus creating the nucleus of the Margraviate of Austria.

== History ==
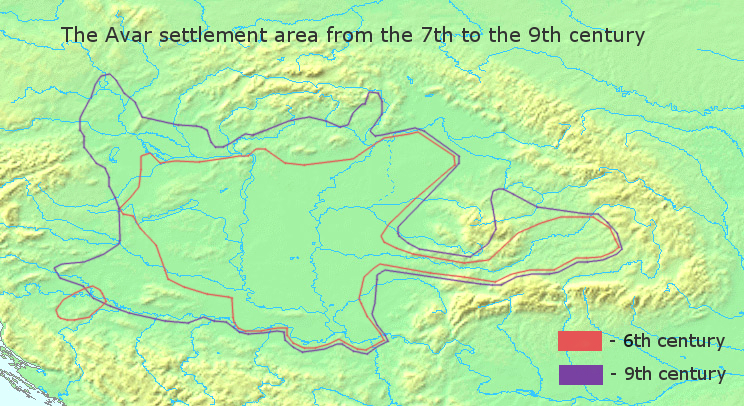
Settlement area of Avars in the Pannonian basin, from the 7th to the 9th century

During the 8th century, Avarian rule in the regions along the river Danube stretched towards the west up to the river Enns, bordering Bavaria. In 788, Franks had established direct rule over Bavaria, and also strengthened their influence over the vassal Carantania, thus provoking neighbouring Avars. During the same year, Avars made an incursion into Bavaria, but Franko-Bavarian forces succeeded in repelling them, and then launched a counterattack towards neighbouring Avarian territories, situated along Danube, eastern from Enns. Two sides clashed near the river Ybbs, on the Ybbs Field (German: Ybbsfeld), where Avars suffered a major defeat (788).

=== Frankish offensives ===
In order to secure eastern borders, Charlemagne came to Bavaria in person, during the autumn of the same year (788). He held a council in Regensburg and regulated several issues regarding Bavarian frontier regions (marches), thus preparing the basis for future actions towards the east. In 790, Avars tried to negotiate a peace settlement with Franks, but no agreement was reached.

In 791, large Frankish army, led by Charlemagne, crossed from Bavaria in to the Avarian territory beyond the river Enns. Frankish army was advancing along the river Danube, divided in two columns, but neither of them found any active resistance, and soon both reached the region of Vienna Woods, at the gates of the Pannonian Plain. No decisive battles were fought, since Avars had retreated deeper into Pannonia, allowing Franks to advance up to the river Rába.

In 796, Frankish forces under Charlemagne's son, king Pepin of Italy (d. 810) and local commanders Eric of Friuli and Voynomir the Slav launched major offensive against Avars in Pannonia. Frankish army allied with local Pannonian Slavs, reached the river Drava, crossed the river Danube to the east and destroyed the main Avarian fortress called the Ring of the Avars. Avarian might was decisively crushed and their khagan became a Frankish vassal, while the remaining Avars retreated behind the river Tisza. Those victories were perpetuated by the epic poem De Pippini regis Victoria Avarica. Frankish campaigns against Avars were also described in the Vita Karoli Magni.

=== New frontier administration ===
Successful Frankish conquests and acquisition of new territories, particularly those between the river Enns and the Vienna Woods, and further towards the river Rába, represented a significant gain for the security of the Frankish state, and particularly for Bavaria. At first, new territories in Upper Pannonia were placed under the jurisdiction of Bavarian prefect Gerold, and subsequently organized as a frontier unit, that became known as the (Bavarian) Eastern March (Latin: marcha orientalis) or Avarian Province (Latin: Provincia Avarorum). It provided safety for Bavarian eastern borders, also securing main communication between Frankish Bavaria and Pannonia.

In the same time, further to the south, neighbouring Carantania, Carniola and southeastern Pannonian regions (Lower Pannonia) were left under the jurisdiction of king Pepin of Italy. Those regions were governed as frontier territories and dependencies of the Carolingian Duchy of Friuli. Thus, at the beginning of the 9th century, Frankish possessions in Pannonia were governed from two centers: Frankish administration in Bavaria was in charge of the northwestern regions of Pannonia (Avarian March in Upper Pannonia), while Frankish administration in Italy was in charge of the southern and eastern regions (Lower Pannonia with Slavic dependencies).

In 799, Bavarian prefect Gerold was killed fighting the Avars, and by 803 situation in Pannonian regions demanded another Frankish intervention. Charlemagne came to Bavaria and dispatched an army to the east, headed by new Bavarian prefect Audulf and frontier count Werner, commander of the eastern march, whose seat was in Lorch (ancient Roman Lauriacum, on the confluence of Enns and Danube). The campaign was successful, and by the end of the same year several Avarian and Slavic lords from Pannonia came to Regensburg, to pay personal homage to Charlrmagne.

During those years, territory along the river Danube, between Enns and Vienna Woods, was ruled directly, as a frontier extension (march) of the Frankish Bavaria, while regions further to the east, up to the river Rába, were designated to remaining Avarian princes, Theodor (d. 805) and Abraham. Avarian princes converted to Christianity and continued to govern their people under the Frankish supreme rule, in the regions of Upper Pannonia, between Carnuntum and Savaria (modern Szombathely, in Hungary).

In 811, another Frankish expedition was sent to the east, this time in order to settle ongoing disputes between Avars and Slavs in Danubian regions of Pannonia. In the autumn of the same year, several Avarian and Slavic lords came to Aachen, in order to resolve mutual disputes in front of the Charlrmagne, thus reaffirming their submission to the supreme Frankish rule. In 822, remaining Avars from Pannonia reaffirmed their allegiance to the Frankish rule.

=== Administrative changes ===
Realm (green) of king Louis of Bavaria, that included (since 828) all southeastern frontier regions

In 817, new emperor Louis I (d. 840) decided to regulate (in advance) various issues related to succession, including the question of governance over dependent peoples on Frankish eastern frontiers. Announcing the future division of Frankish provinces among his three sons, the emperor decided to bestow his young son Louis (d. 876) with prospect of Bavaria, including the rule over dependent Avars and Slavs (Bohemians and Carantanians).

Since prince Louis was still underage, those provisions were not put into immediate effect, but they heralded an important change: since the time of late king Pepin (d. 810), dependent Slavic regions in Carantania, Carniola and southern Pannonia were not governed from Frankish Bavaria, but from Frankish Italy, as territories dependent to the Carolingian Duchy of Friuli. When prince Louis finally became of age in 825–826, those regions were still under administration of his older brother Lothar I (d. 855), ruler of Italy, and his frontier commander, duke Baldric of Friuli.

Upon receiving Bavarian royal crown in 826, young king Louis also wanted to take charge (as soon as possible) of all other regions that were promised to him in 817. Very soon, he got the chance to achieve that goal, and concentrate in his hands governance over Bavaria and Carantania, including all eastern and southeastern marches and dependent Avarian and Slavic territories.

In 826, emperor Louis sent Bertrich, count of the palace, to inspect southeastern frontier regions, regarding the possible Bulgarian threat. Neglected by the emperor, those threats turned out to be real and already by 827–828, king Lothar of Italy and duke Baldric of Friuli failed to secure southeastern frontiers from Bulgarian intrusions. Because of that, emperor Louis decided to divide the vast Duchy of Friuli into four counties, consequently placing Carantania and adjacent regions under the charge of Louis of Bavaria (828). At that point, king Louis of Bavaria became direct ruler of entire Frankish southeast, that included Bavaria and Carantania with all eastern marches and dependent Avarian and Slavic regions throughout Pannonia.

=== The aftermath ===
Unified under Louis of Bavaria (828), entire Frankish southeast became linked to the emerging Eastern Frankish Kingdom, and was subsequently reorganized as the March of Pannonia. During the 830s and 840s, further administrative changes were made in the wider region of Frankish Pannonia, that was by then inhabited mainly by Slavs. By that time, territories of the remaining Avarian princes were fully incorporated into regular administrative structure, and Avars eventually disappeared from the region. Avarian designation for the march also disappeared, and by the 850s, the entire region to the east from Bavaria was already known as the Bavarian wasteland.

In the aftermath, within the further internal subdivisions of the Frankish Empire, Bavaria and southeastern frontier regions remained linked to the Eastern Frankish Kingdom. By the middle of the 9th century, Frankish rule in the region was contested by the Slavic princes of Great Moravia. At the very beginning of the 10th century, the region was invaded and conquered by the Magyars. After the Battle of Lechfeld (955), territories along the river Danube, from the river Enns to the Vienna Woods, were reconquered by Germans, and new Bavarian Eastern March (Latin: marcha orientalis) was established (c. 972) thus creating the nucleus of the Margraviate of Austria.

== See also ==
- Avar Wars
- History of Austria
- History of Hungary
- History of Slovenia
