= Gerold, Prefect of Bavaria =

Gerold (died 1 September 799) was a Franconian nobleman who served the Frankish King, Charlemagne, as Margrave of the Avar March and Prefect of Bavaria in what is now South-Eastern Germany. Gerold played a significant role in the integration of Bavaria into the Frankish Kingdom during Carolingian expansion in the late 8th, and early 9th centuries. Gerold both aided the continuity of Agilofing rule of Bavaria, as well as took steps to integrate Bavarians into the wider scope of the Frankish Kingdom. Gerold was related both to the Agilofing family, the ruling class of Bavaria, as well as the Carolingian family. The Agilofings had ruled Bavaria since Duke Garibald I in 548. Gerold was born into the Agilofings, and his sister Hildegard was married to Charlemagne in 771. From these familial connections, he was appointed Prefect of Bavaria following the deposition of Duke Tassilo III in 788. Gerold was heralded as a superb military commander, giving rise to his promotion to Prefect as a defender of the eastern border of the Frankish Kingdom. In 799, Gerold is said to have fallen in battle against the Avars, shortly after the same Avars killed his brother and ally, Eric, Duke of Friuli, through treachery.

== Carolingian conquest of Bavaria and the deposition of Duke Tassilo III ==
The Agilofing family had dominated the position of Duke of Bavaria from 548 until 788, when Duke Tassilo III was deposed in the wake of his surrender of the Duchy of Bavaria. In 787, following the conquests of both Lombardy and Saxony by the Franks, the Frankish King, Charlemagne, invaded Bavaria from Pannonia, determined to seize it as a buffer state against the Avars, much like he had done in Friuli. In October of 787, having been unable to mount a suitable defense against the Franks, Tassilo III was forced to capitulate, surrendering to Charlemagne both himself and his Duchy, in the hope of continued rule as a vassal to the Frankish King. No such good will was to be found. In 788, following a brief continued rule by Tassio, Charlemagne had him retroactively accused and denounced as an oath-breaker, as he had betrayed the Franks, and namely Charlemagne's father Pippin, years earlier. Tassilo III was sentenced to death. This sentence was commuted, and Tassilo III was sentenced to monastic exile. Tassilo would eventually be called out of exile to surrender all claim to his Ducal title.

== Gerold's rule as Prefect of Bavaria ==
Charlemagne appointed Gerold as Prefect of Bavaria in 788, after Tassilo III was exiled. Gerold was an ideal candidate as he was Charlemagne's brother-in-law; his sister Hildegard had married Charlemagne in 771, as it was common for Carolingian kings to take their wives from the aristocracy of neighboring states. Gerold was also part of the Agilofing family, the traditional rulers of the region. This would aid Bavaria, and particularly the Bavarian aristocracy, in making a smooth transition from Duchy to Frankish Prefecture. Bavaria had long seen itself an independent state, yet throughout the reign of the Merovingian as well as the Carolingian Frankish dynasties, they saw it as a far-flung, unruly, yet still Frankish duchy. With Gerold in power, with ties to both the Agilofing Bavarian aristocracy, as well as the Carolingians through Charlemagne, Bavaria would be brought more into the fold of the Frankish Kingdom. Gerold made his seat of power at Lorch. From here he was granted considerable power in comparison with other counts throughout the Frankish Kingdom, making final rulings on matters such as church inheritances, as well as being in charge of the Bavarian army in times of war. Gerold would go on to battle the Avars to the south-west, as Charlemagne appointed Gerold to prefect of Bavaria well aware of his military prowess, with his main focus during his rule as prefect to be that of a military commander rather than a civil administrator.

== Avar War ==
The Avars, a nomadic, slavized central Asian people, were situated along what is referred to as the eastern Marches of Bavaria, and where Gerold's military command was to be focused for the entirety of his career as prefect of Bavaria. He was, for instance, described in the Royal Frankish Annals as "guard of the Avar border". Historians have referred to the Avar War as one of Charlemagne's greatest wars he ever waged. This is due to the zeal and tenacity with which the Franks, and specifically the Bavarian contingent under Gerold, fought. The war with the Avars began after the deposition of Tassilo III, the last Duke of Bavaria, prior to the full takeover of the state by the Franks, in 787. Tassilo was accused of inciting the Avars into a war with the Franks, promising to attack them with his Bavarian soldiers if the Avars would invade. This accusation led to a charge of treason and treachery against the Franks, which culminated in his exile. Despite Tassilo III's deposition, the Avars decided to wage this war all the same. The Avars led two campaigns against the Franks, invading Bavaria, and both times were beaten back by Gerold, who had newly taken command of the army in the eastern Marches of Bavaria, and his Bavarian contingent. As the war dragged on, the Franks successfully raided the Avars in 791, beating them continually in battle, but never decisively. Eventually the 'Rings of the Avars', a collection of grand fortresses that the Avars were famous for having constructed, were breached by collective efforts from Gerold and his Bavarians, Eric of Friuli, and King Pepin of Italy. The Franks razed the fortresses, plundered them, sending many great riches back to Aachen, Charlemagne's capital, and proceeded to drive the Avars off, considerably weakening their hold in the Avarian marches and western Pannonia, though not breaking the back of their military capabilities completely. This plunder taken from the Avars was to be sent by the Carolingians to many other states, such as that of Mercia, as a show of good faith. The Bavarian troops under Gerold, in combination with Pepin, King of Italy, Charlemagne's son, were later successful in pushing the Avars across the Theiss River, deeper into Pannonia, as the Avars were not inclined to fighting large scale, pitched battles with the Franks, who, with the support, manpower, and arms Charlemagne had collected at Regensburg, were now fully prepared to strike the death-blow at the Avars. In 797 and 799 Charlemagne came to Bavaria, mustering a large force of Franks, Allemans, Bavarians, and soldiers fighting under King Pepin of Italy, at Lorch, where Gerold held his court as prefect. These two campaigns were exceedingly successful in pushing the Avars continually eastwards towards the Danube River.

== Death ==
In 799, the Avars offered Charlemagne gifts as a sign of peace. The Avars would go on to break this peace by attacking the land of Friuli, where his brother the Count of Friuli, Eric, was killed. As punishment for this, Gerold marched his Bavarian contingent into Pannonia to deal with the Avars. It is in this last campaign that Gerold died. There are many conflicting explanations, as the sources all disagree, as to whether he fell in battle fighting, was assassinated, or was the victim of friendly fire while marshaling his forces for battle against the Avars. Upon his death, Gerold's body was taken to the Abbey of Reichenau, in southern Germany, where he was interred. On his tomb was written:

Mole sub hac magni servantur membra Geroldi,
Huius iura loci cunctis qui viribus auxit,
Pannoniis vera Ecclesiae pro pace peremptus,
Oppetiit saevo Septembribus ense Kalendis,
Sideribusque animam dedit. Artus Saxo fidelis
Abstulit, huc retulit dignoque hic clausit honore.

Translation:

'Beneath this monument are kept Gerold's bones,
who did everything in his power to increase the rights of this place [Reichenau];
[he was] killed in Pannonia [fighting] for the true peace of the Church.
He met the savage sword of the Kalends of September [Sept.1],
and gave up his soul to the heavens. His limbs faithful Saxo
carried off, and brought hither, and enclosed them here in worthy honour'.

— Epitaph of Gerold of Bavaria, MGH Poetae I, p.114, trans. Richard Matthew Pollard

Charlemagne and the Franks would go on to defeat the Avars, forcing them to re-settle due to increased hostility from the Slavs to the east. However, Bavaria, under Audulf, would have a much more minor role in the Avar war after Gerold's death.

== Legacy ==
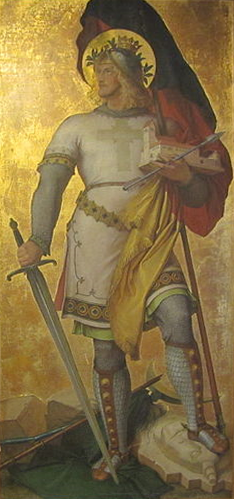
Gerold the Younger by Karl Baumeister.

After Gerold's death in 799 in battle with the Avars, his name lived on. Bavaria, newly brought into the Frankish Kingdom under Charlemagne, would continue to serve as the eastern bulwark of the Franks. It would also see an increased importance within the Frankish Kingdom, being given over to Louis the Pious as his part of the kingdom, after Charlemagne divided it among his heirs. Gerold, while in power, was able to wield traditional Bavarian Law as well as new Frankish customs, allowing the land he presided over to change from an unruly and rebellious duchy into an integrated and functioning cog in the machine of the Frankish kingdom. Gerold was also seen by medieval authors as a champion of the faith, being likened to a Christian martyr, fighting for the peace of the church, in Walafrid Strabo's Visio Wettini, where it says "Since he had such zeal for the Lord, he attacked the heathens to defend the Christian people, [and] suffered the loss of his life; as such he deserved to gleam with eternal trophies, seizing hold of the great gifts of everlasting life". This can be seen as a start of the tradition of fighting to extend the bounds of Christendom by fighting heathen groups such as the Avars; conquering new lands to spread the Christian religion. Gerold also gave much of his own lands to the Church. This was a considerable portion, given that Gerold was descended from some of the richest Allemanian aristocrats at the time. This is again referenced in the Visio Wettini, whereby Gerold is said to have stated that: "The Lord denies me an heir, [but] He will remain as my survivor. What he gave me, he will receive back; I commend [it] to blessed Mary." This may be reference to an altar he dedicated to St. Mary at Reichenau, upon which is written: "Hanc quique devote convenitis ad aulam, Poplitibusque flexis propiatis ad aram, Cernite conspicuum sacris aedibus altar, Geroltus quod condidit lamina ninenti, Virgineo qoud condecent alvo pudoris, Subque voto Mariae intulit in aulam. Hic agni cruor caroque propinatur ex ara, Cuius tactu huius sacrantur lamina axis. Huc quicumque cum prece penetrates ad aram, Dicite, rogo: 'Alme miserer Gerolto', Titulo qui tali ornovit virginis templum, Aetherio fruatur sede felix in aevum!" This translates to: 'You, who have come devotedly to this hall, approach the altar on bent knees, and look at this wondrous altar in this sacred place, [an altar] which Gerold built, with gleaming giltwork that becomes the virginal womb of chastity. As an offering to Mary he brought it into the hall. Here the blood and flesh of the lamb [i.e. Christ] is set out, By whose touch the giltwork of the [table?] is sanctified. Whoever ventures with a prayer to this altar, Say, I beg, "Kindly [God], take pity on Gerold, Who decorated the temple of the Virgin with such a glorious thing, And may he happily enjoy a heavenly seat forever!'"

This dedication by Gerold serves to reinforce the fact that Gerold was indeed a champion of the Christian religion. He made it his legacy to give to the Church, leaving behind him a tradition of rich Frankish Christians making donations to the Church.

== Literature ==
- Gerold, Neue deutsche Biographie, p. 316, 1964.
- Gerold, genealogie-mittelalter.de
