= Bayan II =

Avar khagan

Bayan II was an Avar khagan between 602 and 617.

Preceded by Bayan I	Avar Khagan; Kutrigur Ruler	Succeeded by Organa
