= Abraham (Avar khagan) =

Khagan of the Avar Khaganate

Abraham became an Avar khagan around 805. He was the successor of Theodorus.

Abraham was baptised in Germany. He died or was deposed before 811, because in this year, the Avar khagan was his successor.

== Footnotes ==
Preceded by Theodorus	Avar Khagan; 805— c.811?	Succeeded by Isaac
