= Patriarch Peter of Alexandria =

Patriarch Peter of Alexandria may refer to:

- Patriarch Peter I of Alexandria, Greek Patriarch of Alexandria in 300–311
- Patriarch Peter II of Alexandria, Greek Patriarch of Alexandria in 373–380
- Patriarch Peter III of Alexandria, Greek Patriarch of Alexandria in 477 and 482–490
- Patriarch Peter IV of Alexandria, Greek Patriarch of Alexandria in 642–651
- Patriarch Peter V of Alexandria, Greek Patriarch of Alexandria between the 7th and 8th centuries
- Patriarch Peter VI of Alexandria, Greek Patriarch of Alexandria between the 7th and 8th centuries
- Patriarch Peter VII of Alexandria, Greek Patriarch of Alexandria and all Africa in 1997–2004
