= De Pippini regis Victoria Avarica =

Rythmus (or Carmen) de Pippini regis Victoria Avarica ("Poem [song] of king Pippin's Avar victory"), also known by its incipit as Omnes gentes qui fecisti ("All peoples whom you created"), is a medieval Latin encomium celebrating the victory of King Pepin of Italy over the Avars in the summer of 796. It is associated with an experimental trend of the Carolingian Renaissance and, though its author, probably a cleric, is unknown, is associated with the Veronese "school" of poets, one of whom, at the same time, produced the Versus de Verona, praising the royal capital of Italy, where it and De Pippini were probably written.

De Pippini is usually classified as a "popular ballad", though it does not fit stereotypes of either popular or learned literature and has been likened more to a chanson de geste. It contains some vulgarisms in grammar, orthography, syntax, style, and form, but much of its hybrid nature is probably purposed. Despite this, and its unusual metre, its rhythm is regular. It contains fifteen stanzas and a final line.

Historically, the Avars settled in Pannonia in a series of ring-shaped fortresses arranged in an even larger ring. An Avar army first appeared on the borders of the Carolingian world in 782 at the river Enns. They were defeated in 795 by Duke Eric of Friuli, who sent an enormous booty to the imperial capital of Aachen; one of their princes, a tudun, submitted and did homage. In 796 Pepin forced their supreme prince to likewise submit. Structurally, the poet moves from divine praise, a condemnation of the Avars (in language similar to that found in contemporary annals), a narrative of events (including dialogue), and finally praise of its hero, Pepin. The words put in the mouth of the defeated Avar leader, the Kagan (Cacanus), mirror contemporary legal formulae of submission. The Kagan, and his wife Catuna, had previously been warned by one of his men, Unguimer, that his kingdom would fall to the princeps catholicus (catholic prince) Pepin. At the news of Pepin's approaching army, the Kagan, cum Tarcan primatibus, went to do him homage. The final stanzas, with the acclamatory Vivat, vivat rex Pippinus ("Long live king Pepin!") at stanza 14 and the final line of Gloria aeterna patri, gloria sit filio ("Eternal glory be to the Father, glory to His son"), suggest public recitation and liturgical influence.

The poem was translated into English by Jack Lindsay in Medieval Latin Poets (E. Mathews and Marrot, 1934). It was also translated into English and published in booklet form in a limited edition of 300 copies: Bill Griffiths (1976), The Song of the Hunnish Victory of Pippin the King (Earthgrip Press, ISBN 0-905341-02-3). Its most recent translator, Peter Godman (1985), Latin Poetry of the Carolingian Renaissance (Norman: University of Oklahoma Press), titled it "King Pippin's victory over the Avars". The first stanza as edited and translated by Godman, goes:

Omnes gentes qui fecisti, tu Christe, dei suboles,
terras, fontes, rivos, montes et formasti hominem,
Avaresque convertisti ultimis temporibus.

Translation:

Christ, son of God, who created all peoples,
lands, springs, rivers, mountains and formed mankind,
has converted the Avars in the recent past.
