= Pope Peter of Alexandria =

Pope Peter of Alexandria may refer to:

- Pope Peter I of Alexandria, ruled in 300–311
- Pope Peter II of Alexandria, ruled in 373–380
- Pope Peter III of Alexandria, ruled in 477–490
- Pope Peter IV of Alexandria, ruled in 565–569
- Pope Peter V of Alexandria, ruled in 1340–1348
- Pope Peter VI of Alexandria, ruled in 1718–1726
- Pope Peter VII of Alexandria, ruled in 1809–1852
