= Chronicle of Peter of Alexandria =

The Brief Survey of the Times from Adam to the Present, known conventionally as the Chronicle of Peter of Alexandria, is a Byzantine history of the world from Creation to the reign of Leo VI the Wise. It was completed sometime between Leo's accession in 886 and the coronation of his son, Constantine VII, in 908.

The author of the Chronicle is described as "the Orthodox and Christian Peter of Alexandria", but is otherwise unknown. Theologically he was a Chalcedonian and an iconophile. He was probably not writing in Alexandria, where there was a small Greek Orthodox community, but had likely relocated to Constantinople as a young man, as his fellow historian George Synkellos had relocated from Palestine.

The Chronicle contains 26 chapters. Peter's main source was the Bible. More than half the Chronicle is based on the Book of Genesis. His use of the Alexandrian era, dating Creation to 5493 BC, may come from Panodoros of Alexandria, but it was already the standard Byzantine calendar in his time. Peter had an interest in chronology, computing the time between the births of the biblical patriarchs and between biblical events. For later history, he includes lists of rulers of Egypt and Rome. He is the only known source for the number of times the emperors assumed the consulship between 630 and 886, after which Leo VI abolished the office. He is also the unique Byzantine source for the claim that Prokopia, the wife of Emperor Michael I Rangabe, poisoned the Emperor Staurakios.

The Chronicle is short: 32 pages in the manuscript, 17 in its modern edition. Only a single manuscript is now known, the former Coislinianus 229 now in Moscow. It has been dated on stylistic grounds to the 10th century. Two other manuscripts are thought to be lost, one from the Escorial and another that was in Dresden during World War II. The Dresden manuscript, Sächsische Landesbibliothek cod. Da. 52, was from the 13th century. Zinaida Samodurova published the Chronicle from the Moscow manuscript in 1961 with a short introduction in Russian. An English translation from the Greek has been made of the first six chapters.

== Bibliography ==
- Hilmarsen, Eva Louise (2024). The Chronicle of Peter of Alexandria: Translation and Commentary of the First Six Chapters of the CPA (Graduate thesis). Norwegian University of Science and Technology.
- Mariev, Sergei (2016). "Peter of Alexandria". Encyclopedia of the Medieval Chronicle Online. Brill. doi:10.1163/2213-2139_emc_SIM_02032.
- Neville, Leonora (2018). Guide to Byzantine Historical Writing. Cambridge University Press.
- Treadgold, Warren (2013). The Middle Byzantine Historians. Palgrave Macmillan.
- Wahlgren, Staffan (2025). "From Theophanes to Psellos: The Middle Byzantine Period". In Raimondo Tocci (ed.). A Companion to Byzantine Chronicles. Brill. pp. 367–389.
