= Turkic migration =

Historical expansion of Turkic tribes and languages

The Turkic migrations were the spread of Turkic tribes and Turkic languages across Eurasia between the 6th and 11th centuries. In the 6th century, the Göktürks overthrew the Rouran Khaganate in what is now Mongolia and expanded in all directions, spreading Turkic culture throughout the Eurasian steppes. Although Göktürk empires came to an end in the 8th century, they were succeeded by numerous Turkic empires such as the Uyghur Khaganate, Kara-Khanid Khanate, Khazars, and the Cumans. Some Turks eventually settled down into sedentary societies such as the Qocho and Ganzhou Uyghurs. The Seljuq dynasty invaded Anatolia starting in the 11th century, resulting in permanent Turkic settlement and presence there. Modern nations with large Turkic populations include Kyrgyzstan, Turkmenistan, Turkey, Azerbaijan, Uzbekistan, and Kazakhstan, and Turkic populations also exist within other nations, such as Chuvashia, Bashkortostan, Tatarstan and the Sakha Republic of Siberia in Russia, Northern Cyprus, the Crimean Tatars, the Kazakhs in Mongolia, the Uyghurs in China, and the Azeris in Iran.

== Origin theories ==
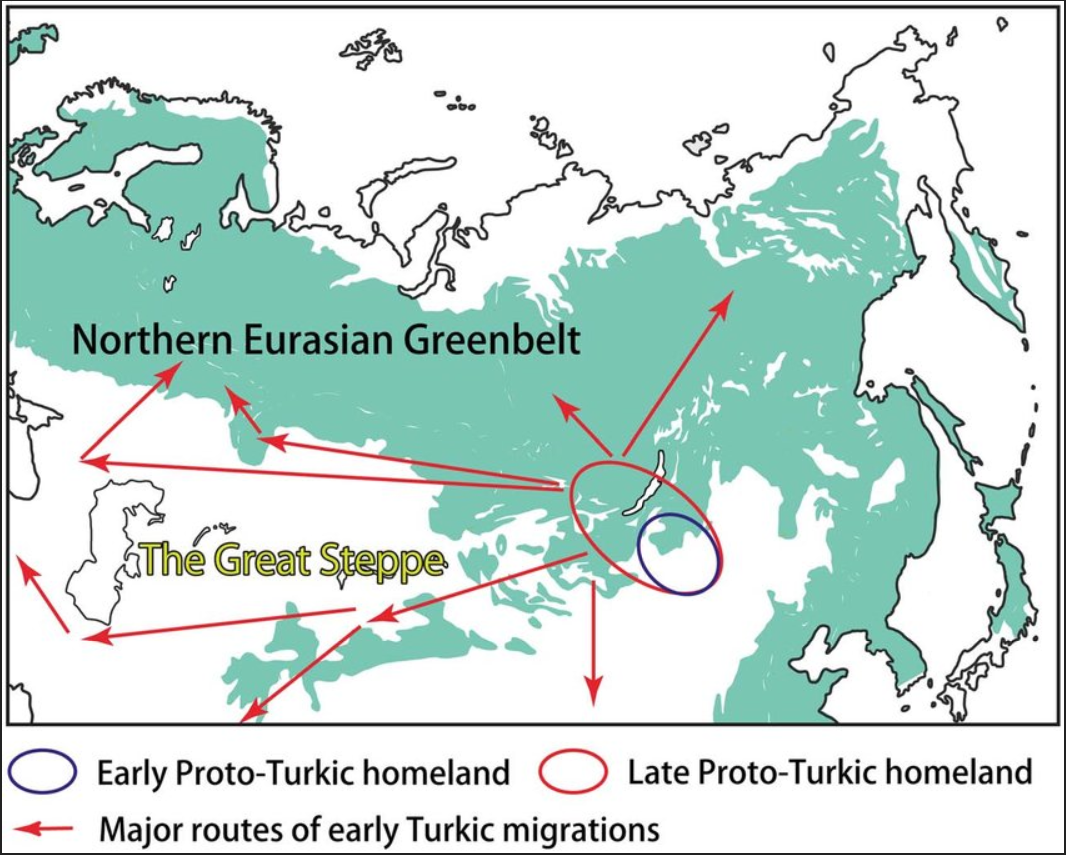
The origin and later expansion of the Turkic peoples from Uchiyama et al. 2020

Proposals for the homeland (Urheimat) of the Turkic peoples and their language are far-ranging, from the Transcaspian steppe to Northeastern Asia (Manchuria). Peter Benjamin Golden listed Proto-Turkic lexical items about the climate, topography, flora, fauna, people's modes of subsistence in the hypothetical Proto-Turkic Urheimat and proposed that the Proto-Turkic Urheimat was located at the southern, taiga-steppe zone of the Sayan-Altay region. According to Yunusbayev et al. (2015), genetic evidence points to an origin in the region near South Siberia and Mongolia as the "Inner Asian Homeland" of the Turkic ethnicity. Similarly several linguists, including Juha Janhunen, Roger Blench and Matthew Spriggs, suggest that Mongolia is the homeland of the early Turkic language. According to Robbeets, the Turkic people descend from people who lived in a region extending from present-day South Siberia and Mongolia to the West Liao River Basin (modern Manchuria). Authors Joo-Yup Lee and Shuntu Kuang analyzed ten years of genetic research on Turkic people and compiled scholarly information about Turkic origins, and said that the early and medieval Turks were a heterogeneous group and that the Turkification of Eurasia was a result of language diffusion, not a migration of a homogeneous population. Uchiyama et al argue that since nomadic peoples such as Xiongnu, Rouran and Xianbei share underlying genetic ancestry "that falls into or close to the northeast Asian gene pool", the proto-Turkic language likely originated in northeastern Asia, on the eastern fringes of the Northern Eurasian Greenbelt forest zone. Around 1200 BC, the (hunter-gathering and semi-agricultural) ancestors of the Turkic peoples probably migrated westwards into the steppe of Mongolia, where they adopted a pastoral lifestyle, in part borrowed from Iranian peoples.

=== Debate about the origins of the Huns ===
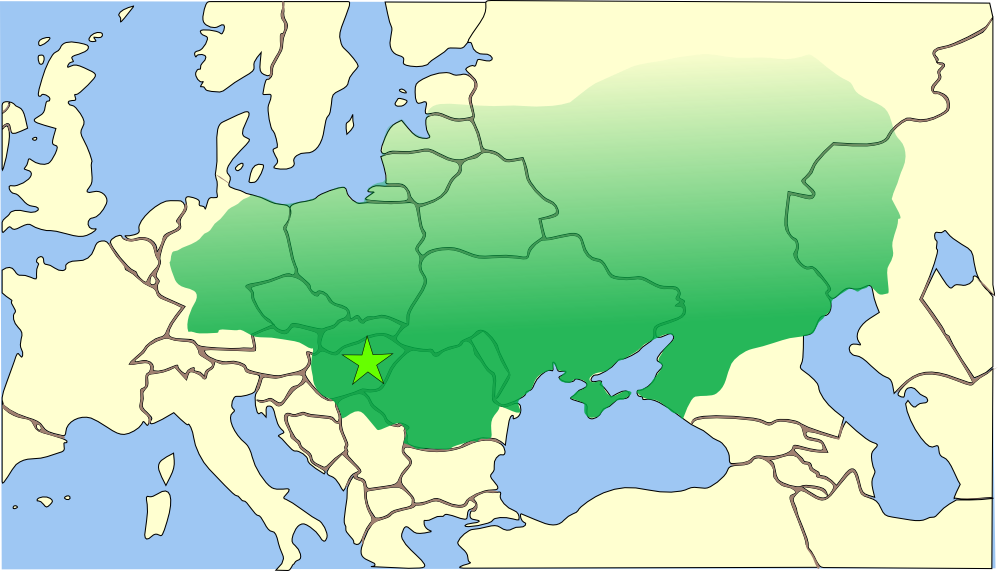
The Hun Empire in about 450, according to European authors. The star marks where the nomadic Huns chose to encamp, the Hungarian plain, a sort of enclave of steppe country in a mountainous region.

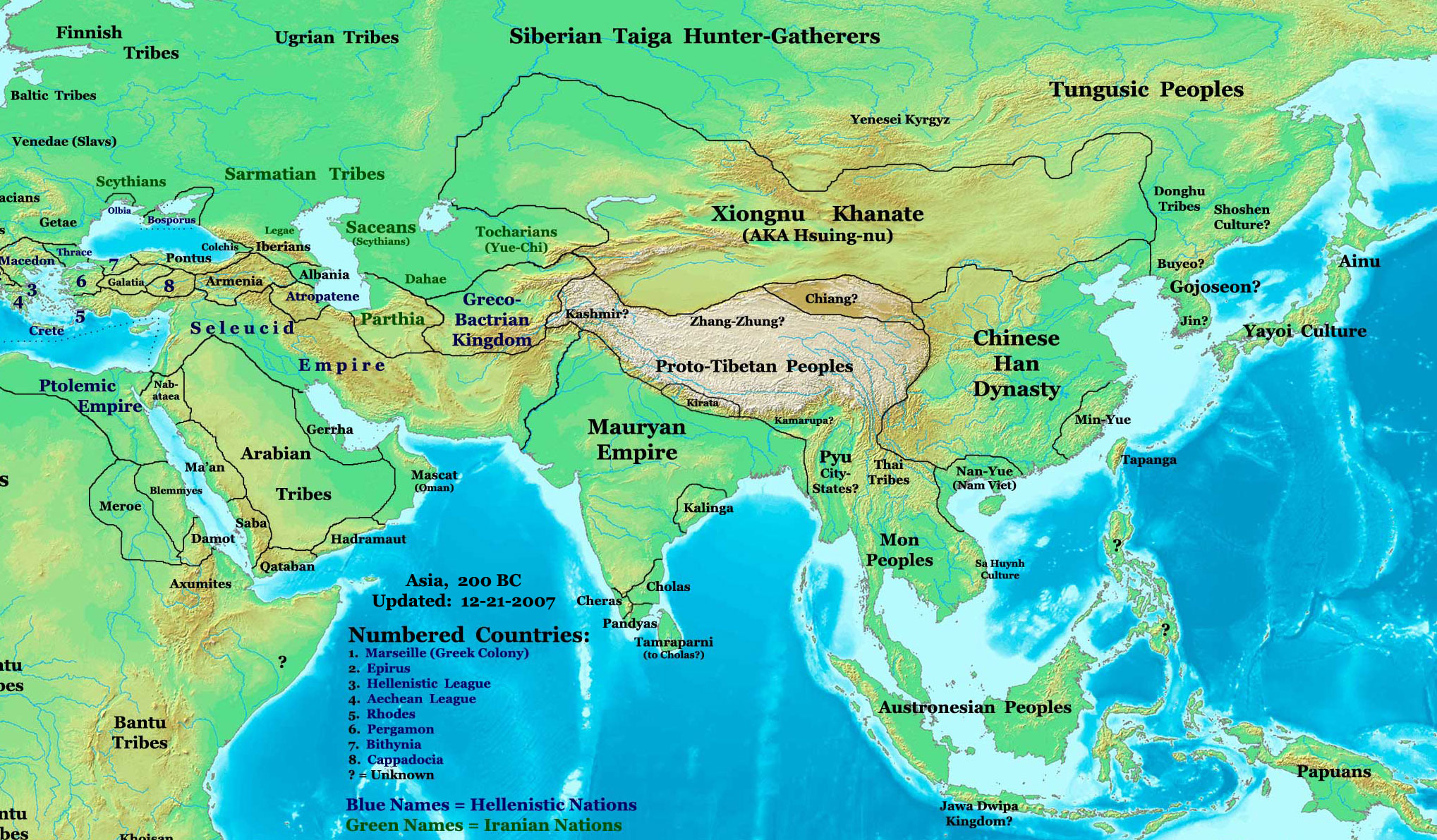
Asia in 200 BC, showing the early Xiongnu state and its neighbors

The Huns have often been considered a people with Turkic origins and/or associated with the Xiongnu. However, the precise origins and identity of the Huns are still debated. In regard to their cultural genesis, the Cambridge Ancient History of China asserts that "from about the eighth century BC, throughout inner Asia horse-riding pastoral communities appeared, giving origin to warrior societies". These were part of a larger belt of equestrian pastoralists stretching from the Black Sea to Mongolia, and known collectively to the Greeks as Scythians. The Huns per se were first documented as a nomadic people, in Central Asia, the Caucasus, and Eastern Europe, between the 4th and 6th century AD. According to the first European sources to mention the Huns, they were then living east of the Volga River, in an area that was part of Scythia at the time; the Huns' arrival is associated with the migration westward of an Indo-Iranian people, the Alans. After entering Europe, the Huns incorporated members of other peoples, such as the Alans, Slavs and Goths.

None or few of the Huns were literate (judging by the accounts of contemporaries such as Procopius). They left no texts and few other linguistic clues to their origins, apart from personal names. Some names, such as Ultinčur and Alpilčur, apparently had endings related to suffixes used in Turkic personal names: Old Turkic -čor, Pecheneg -tzour and Kirghiz -čoro. Some Turkic ethnonyms had cognate endings, such as Utigur, Onogur, and Ultingir. However, other personal names among the Huns appear to have had Iranian, Germanic, mixed or unknown origins.

== History ==
=== Göktürk wave (5th – 8th c.) ===
==== Tiele and Turk ====
The earliest Turks mentioned in textual sources are the Xinli (薪犁), Gekun (鬲昆), and Tiele (鐵勒), the last of which possibly transcribes endonym *Tegreg '[People of the] Carts', recorded by the Chinese in the 6th century. According to the New Book of Tang, Tiele may be a mistaken form of Chile/Gaoche, who themselves may be related to Xiongnu and Dingling.

Many scholars believe the Di, Dili, Dingling, and later Tujue mentioned in textual sources are all just Chinese transcriptions of the same Turkic word türk, yet Golden proposes that Tujue transcribed *Türküt while Dili, Dingling, Chile, Tele, & Tiele transcribed *Tegreg.

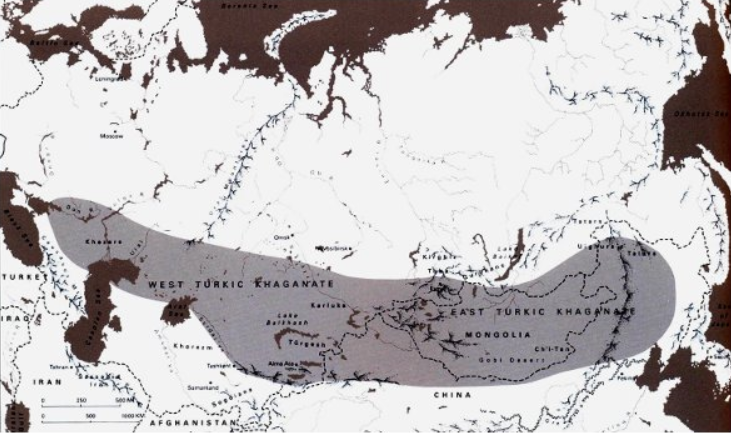
The First Turkic Khaganate in 568

The first reference to Türk or Türküt appears in 6th-century Chinese sources as the transcription Tūjué (突厥). The earliest evidence of Turkic languages and the use of Turk as an endonym comes from the Orkhon inscriptions of the Göktürks (English: 'Celestial Turks' ) in the early 8th century. Many groups speaking Turkic languages never adopted the name Turk for their own identity. Among the peoples that came under Göktürk dominance and adopted its political culture and lingua-franca, the name Turk was not always the preferred identity. Turk, therefore, did not apply to all Turkic peoples at the time, but only referred to the Eastern Turkic Khaganate, while the Western Turkic Khaganate and Tiele used their own tribal names. Of the Tiele, the Book of Sui mentions only tribes which were not a part of the First Turkic Khaganate. There was not a unified expansion of Turkic tribes. Peripheral Turkic peoples in the Göktürk Empire like the Bulgars and even central ones like the Oghuz and Karluks migrated autonomously with migrating traders, soldiers and townspeople.

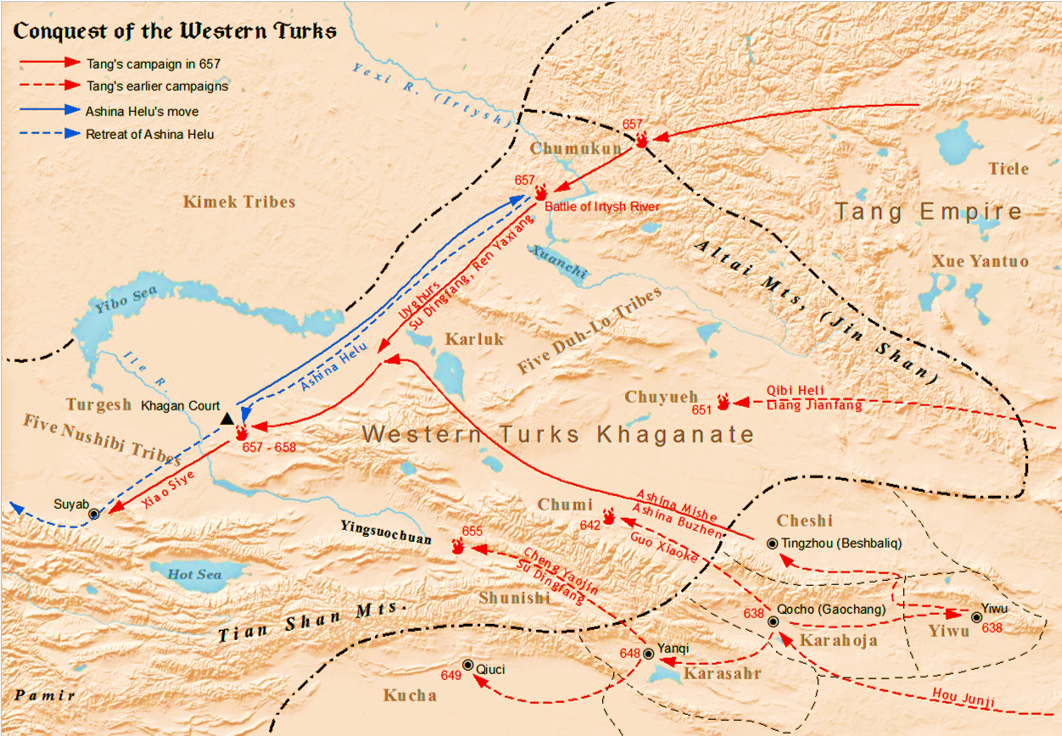
Tang campaigns against the Western Turks

The precise date of the initial expansion from the early homeland remains unknown. The first state known as Turk, giving its name to the many states and peoples afterward, was that of the Göktürks (gök 'blue' or 'celestial', however in this context gök refers to the direction 'east'. Therefore, Gökturks only denoted the Eastern Turks in the 6th century. In 439, the head of the Ashina clan led his people from Pingliang (now in modern Gansu province, China) to the Rouran seeking inclusion in their confederacy and protection. His tribe consisted of famed metalsmiths and was granted land near a mountain quarry that looked like a helmet, from which they got the name Turk/Tujue 突厥. In 546, the leader of the Ashina, Bumin, aided the Rouran in putting down a Tiele revolt. Bumin requested a Rouran princess for his service but was denied, after which he declared independence. In 551, Bumin declared himself Khagan and married Princess Changle from Western Wei. He then dealt a serious blow to the Rouran Khaganate the next year, but died soon after. His sons, Issik Qaghan and Muqan Qaghan, continued to wage war on the Rouran, finishing them off in 554. By 568, their territory had reached the edges of the Byzantine Empire, where the Avars, possibly related to the Rouran in some fashion, escaped. In 581, Taspar Qaghan died and the khaganate entered a civil war that resulted in two separate Turkic factions. The Eastern Khaganate was defeated by the Tang dynasty in 630 while the Western Khaganate fell to the Tang in 657. In 682, Ilterish Qaghan rebelled against the Tang and founded the Second Turkic Khaganate, which fell to the Uyghurs in 744.

==== Bulgar ====
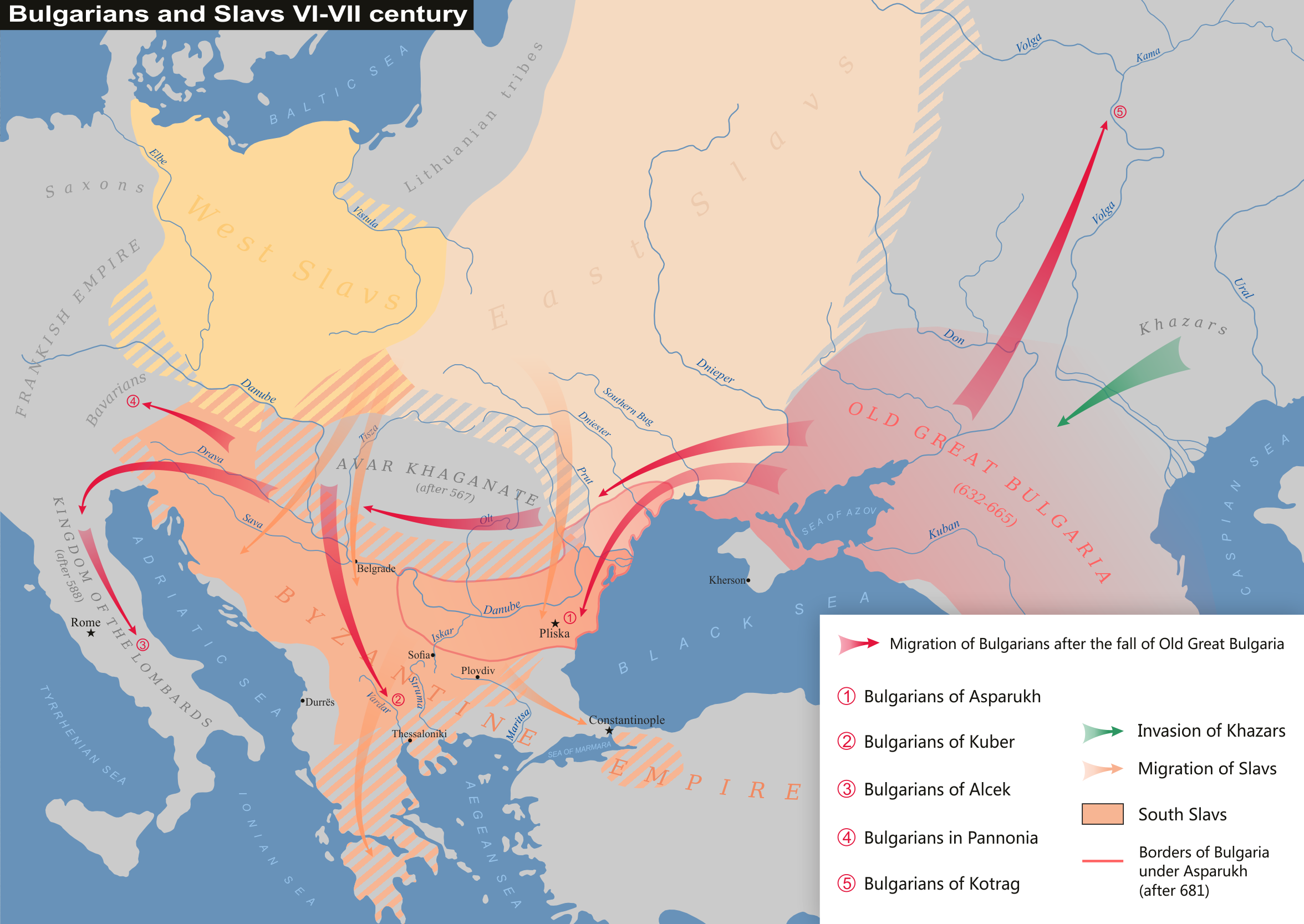
The migration of the Bulgars after the fall of Old Great Bulgaria in the 7th century

The Bulgars, also known as the Onogur-Bulgars or Onogundurs, occupied the Black Sea Kuban steppe zone sometime during the 5th century. It would be in 480, while serving as allies of Byzantine Emperor Zeno, that the Bulgars are first mentioned. John of Nikiû (fl. 680–690) wrote about Vitalian (Roman general and consul, died 520) in his "Chronicle of John, bishop of Nikiu": "Vitalian withdrew into the province of Bulgaria." By the 7th century, they were under the rule of the Avars, who they revolted against in 635 under the leadership of Kubrat. Prior to this, Kubrat had made an alliance with Heraclius of the Byzantine Empire. He was baptized in 619. Kubrat died in the 660s and his territory, Old Great Bulgaria, was divided between his five sons.

One of them, the elder brother Batbayan stayed and was subjugated by the Khazars.

Another one, Kotrag, following the death of his father, began to extend the influence of his Bulgars to the Volga River. He is remembered as the founder of Volga Bulgaria.

Another of the sons named Kuber headed to Pannonia where he revolted against the Pannonian Avars and migrated to Thessalonika by 679.

Alcek was allegedly a son of Kubrat and led the Bulgars to Ravenna that later settled the lands of the Longobard Kingdom in the villages of Gallo Matese, Sepino, Boiano and Isernia in the Matese mountains of southern Italy.

Asparuh was the first ruler of the First Bulgarian Empire, the first state the Roman empire recognised in the Balkans and the first time it legally surrendered claims to part of its Balkan dominions. In 680 the Byzantine Emperor Constantine IV (r. 668–685), having recently defeated the Arabs, led an expedition at the head of a huge army and fleet to drive off the Bulgars but suffered a disastrous defeat at the hands of Asparuh at Onglos, a swampy region in or around the Danube Delta where the Bulgars had set a fortified camp. The Bulgars advanced south, crossed the Balkan Mountains and invaded Thrace. In 681, the Byzantines were compelled to sign a humiliating peace treaty, forcing them to acknowledge Bulgaria as an independent state, to cede the territories to the north of the Balkan Mountains and to pay an annual tribute.

==== Khazar ====
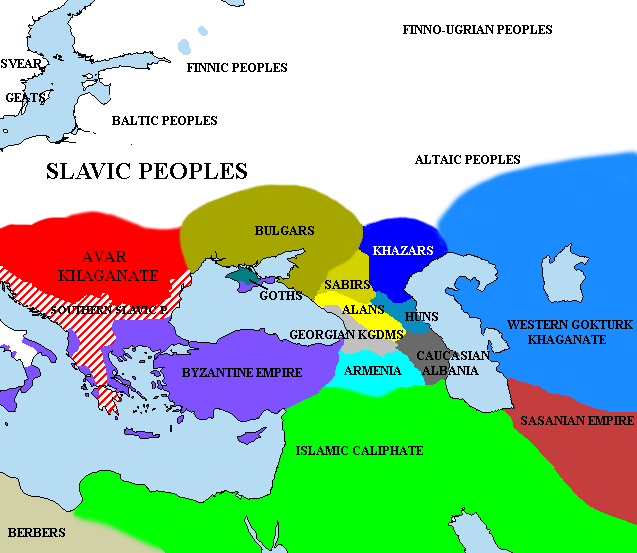
The Pontic–Caspian steppe around 650 AD

The origin of the Khazars is unclear. According to Al-Masudi, the Khazars were called Sabirs in Turkic. Dunlop (1954) suggests a relation to Uyghurs, some of whom might have migrated west before 555 CE. Because imperial Chinese sources linked Khazars to Göktürks, others believe the Khazars were founded by Irbis Seguy, the penultimate ruler of the Western Turkic Khaganate, since the Hudud al-'Alam says the Khazar king descended from the Ansa, which has been interpreted as Ashina. By the mid-7th century, the Khazars were located in the North Caucasus, where they fought against the Umayyads constantly.

==== Kyrgyz ====
According to the Book of Tang, the Yenisei Kyrgyz were tall, red-haired, pale-faced, and green-eyed; black-eyed Kyrgyz were claimed to be descendants of Han general Li Ling, presumably including the Kyrgyz Khagans who claimed such descent. It also notes that Kyrgyz women outnumbered men, both men and women wore tattoos, and they made weapons which they gave to the Turks. They practiced agriculture but did not grow fruits. The Kyrgyz lived west of Lake Baikal and east of the Karluks. According to the Book of Sui, the Kyrgyz chafed at the domination of the First Turkic Khaganate. The Uyghur Khaganate also made war on the Kyrgyz and cut them off from trade with China, which the Uyghurs monopolized. As a result, the Kyrgyz turned to other channels of trade such as with the Tibetans, Arabs, and Karluks. From 820 onward, the Kyrgyz were constantly at war with the Uyghurs, until 840, when the Uyghur Khaganate was dismantled. Although the Kyrgyz managed to occupy some of the Uyghur lands, they had no great effect on the geopolitical configuration around them. The Chinese paid no heed to them other than to award them with some titles and reasoned that since the Uyghurs were no longer in power, there was no reason to maintain relations with the Kyrgyz any longer. The Kyrgyz themselves seemed to lack any interest in occupying the former territory of the Uyghurs in the east. By 924, the Khitans had occupied Otuken in the territory of the former Uyghur Khaganate.

==== Turgesh ====
In 699, the Turgesh ruler Wuzhile founded a khaganate stretching from Chach to Beshbalik. He and his successor Saqal campaigned against the Tang dynasty and their Turkic allies until 711 when the resurgent Second Turkic Khaganate crushed the Turgesh in battle. Turgesh remnants under Suluk re-established themselves in Zhetysu. Suluk was killed by one of his subordinates in 737 after he was defeated by the Umayyads. The Tang took advantage of the situation to invade Turgesh territory and took the city of Suyab. In the 760s, the Karluks drove out the Turgesh.

==== Karluk ====
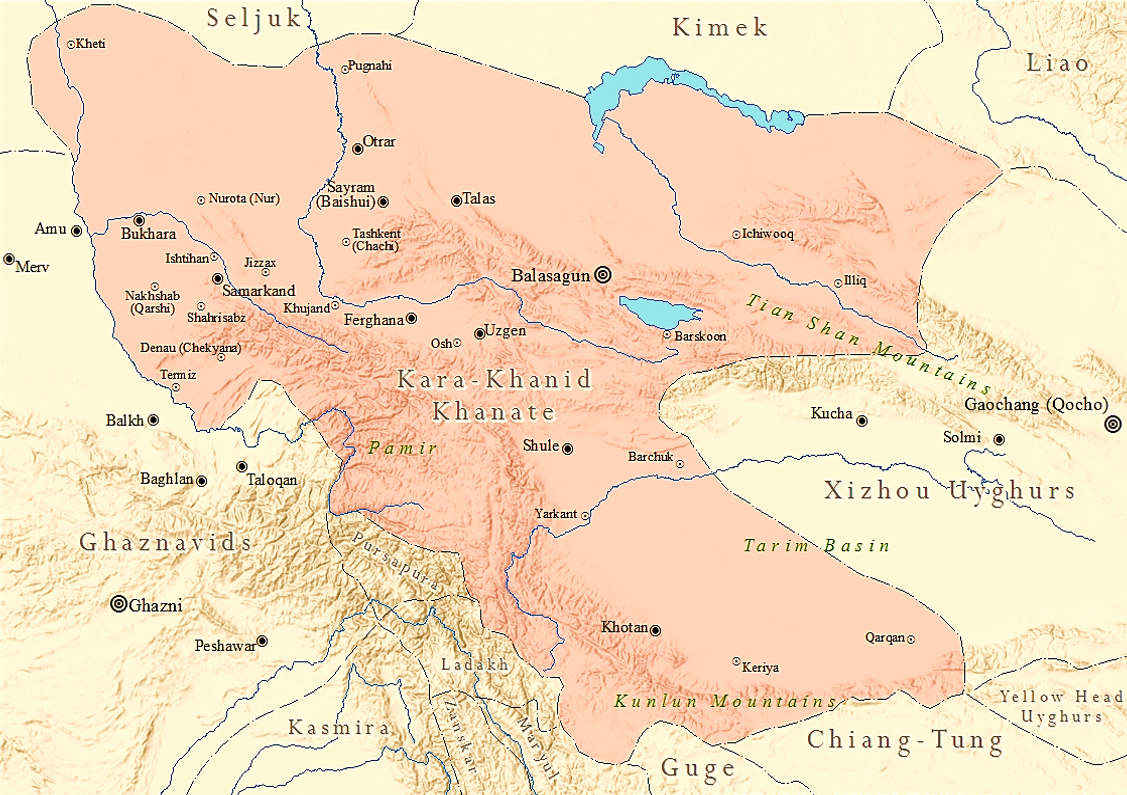
Kara-Khanid Khanate in 1006

The Karluks (Note: Their name qarluğ ~ *qarluq is often derived from Proto-Turkic *qar, meaning "snow". Marcel Erdal critiques that suggestion as folk-etymology and proposes that "the name is likely to be an exonym, formed as an -(O)k derivate from the verb kar-ıl- 'to mingle (intr.)' discussed in Erdal (1991: 662); it would thus have signified 'the mingled ones', presumably because the tribe evolved from the mingling of discrete groups," as already suggested by Doerfer.) migrated into the area of Tokharistan as early as the 7th century. In 744, they participated in the Uyghur Khaganate's rise by overthrowing the Second Turkic Khaganate, but conflict with the Uyghurs forced them to migrate further west into Zhetysu. By 766, they had pushed out the Turgesh and took the Western Turkic capital of Suyab. Islam began spreading in the Karluk tribes during the 9th century. According to the Hudud al-'Alam, written in the 10th century, the Karluks were pleasant nearly civilized people who participated in agriculture as well as herding and hunting. Al-Masudi considered the Karluks to be the most beautiful people among the Turks, being tall in stature, and lordly in appearance. By the 11th century, they had integrated a considerable number of Sogdians into their population, resulting in speech that to Mahmud al-Kashgari, sounded slurred. The Karluks, Chigils, and Yagmas formed the Kara-Khanid Khanate in the 9th century, but it's unclear whether the leadership of the new polity fell to the Karluks or the Yagmas.

==== Pecheneg ====
Territories of the Pechenegs c. 1030

Paul Pelliot (apud Pritsak, 1975) first proposed that the 7th century Chinese historical Book of Sui preserved the earliest record on the Pechenegs; the book mentioned a people named Bĕirù (北褥; LMC: *puǝ̌k-rjwk < EMC: *pǝk-ŋuawk), who had settled near the Ēnqū (恩屈; LMC: *ʔən-kʰyt < EMC: *ʔən-kʰut < *On[o]gur) and Alan (阿蘭; MC: *ʔa-lan) peoples (identified as Onogurs and Alans, respectively), to the east of Fulin (拂菻) (or the Eastern Roman Empire). Victor Spinei emphasizes that the Pechenegs' association with the Bĕirù is "uncertain"; instead, he asserts that an 8th-century Uighur envoy's report, which survives in Tibetan translation, contains the first certain reference to the Pechenegs: the report recorded an armed conflict between the Be-ča-nag and the Hor (Uyghurs or Oghuz Turks) peoples in the region of the river Syr Darya. The Pecheneg tribes were possibly related to the Kangly. In the late 9th century, conflict with the Khazars drove the Pechenegs into the Pontic steppes. In the 10th century, they had substantial interactions with the Byzantine Empire, who depended on them for keeping control of their neighbors. Byzantine and Muslim sources confirm that the Pechenegs had a leader, but the position was not passed down from father to son. In the 10th century, the Pechenegs came into military conflict with the Rus', and in the early 11th century, military conflict with the Oghuz Turks drove them further west across the Danube into Byzantine territory.

=== Uyghur wave (8th – 9th c.) ===
==== Oghuz ====
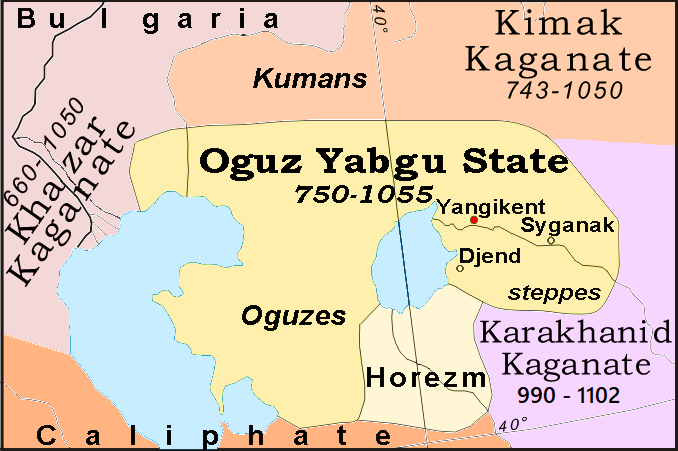
The Oghuz Yabgu State c. 750

The Oghuz Turks take their name from the Turkic word for 'clan', 'tribe', or 'kinship'. As such, Oghuz is a common appellation for many Turkic groups, such as the Toquz Oghuz (nine tribes), Sekiz Oghuz (eight tribes), and Uch Oghuz (three tribes). Oghuz has been used to refer to many different Turkic tribes, causing much confusion. For example, the ruler of the Oghuz was called the Toquz Khagan, even though there were twelve tribes instead of nine. It is uncertain if the Oghuz Turks were directly descended from the Toquz Oghuz. They may have been under the direct leadership of the Toquz at some point, but by the 11th century, the Oghuz were already linguistically distinct from their neighbors such as the Kipchaks and Karakhanids. Zuev (1960) connects the Oghuzes to the Western Turkic tribe 姑蘇 Gūsū (< MC *kuo-suo) mentioned in the Chinese encyclopedia Tongdian, as well as the 三屈 'Three Qu' (< MC *k(h)ɨut̚) in the 8th-century Taibo Yinjing (太白陰經) 'Venus's Secret Classic' and the three Ġuz hordes mentioned in Al-Masudi's Meadows of Gold and Mines of Gems.

The Oghuz migration westward began with the fall of the Second Turkic Khaganate and the rise of the Uyghur Khaganate in 744. Under the Uyghur rule, the Oghuz leader obtained the title of "right yabgu". When they appeared in Muslim textual sources in the 9th century, they were described using the same title. The Oghuz fought a series of wars with the Pechenegs, Khalaj, Charuk, and Khazars for the steppes, emerging victorious and establishing the Oghuz Yabgu State. The Oghuz were in constant conflict with the Pechenegs and Khazars throughout the 10th century, as recorded by Muslim texts, but they also cooperated at times. In one instance, the Khazars hired the Oghuz to fight off an attack by the Alans. In 965, the Oghuz took part in a Rus' attack on the Khazars and in 985 they joined the Rus' again in attacking Volga Bulgaria. The Yabgu State of the Oghuz did not have a central leadership and there is no evidence of the Yabgu acting as a spokesman for the entire Oghuz people. By the 10th century, some Oghuz had settled in towns and converted to Islam, although many tribes still followed Tengrism.

==== Cuman Kipchak ====
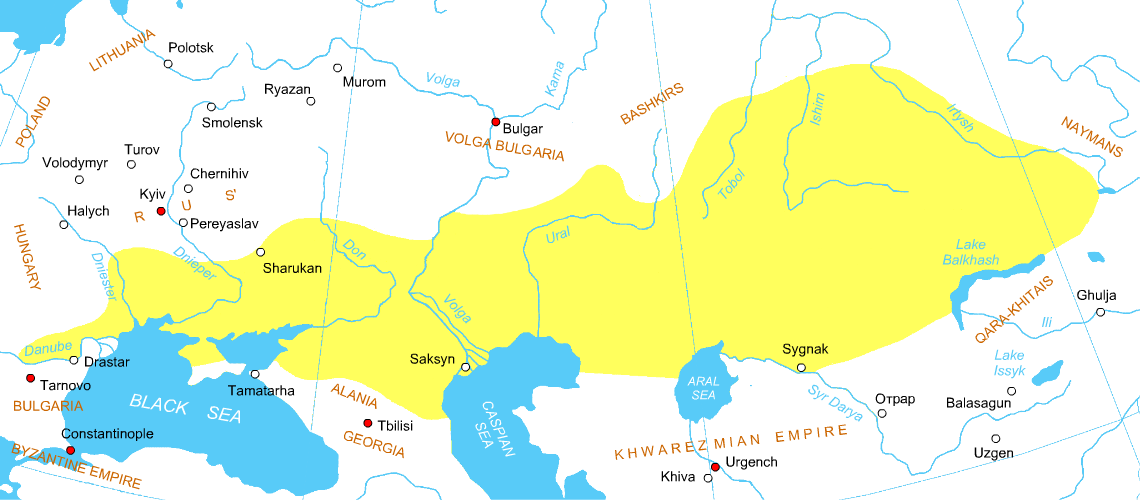
Cuman–Kipchak confederation in Eurasia circa 1200

The relationship and origins of the Cumans and Kipchaks is uncertain. Probably, Cumans and Kipchaks had originally been two distinct Turkic peoples who joined one same confederation, with Cumans constituting the western part and Kipchaks the eastern part. According to Rashid al-Din Hamadani, writing much later in the Ilkhanate, Kipchak is derived from a Turkic word which means 'hollow rotted out tree'. Cuman may be derived from the Turkic word qun, which means 'pale' or 'yellow". Some scholars associate the Cumans-Kipchaks with the Kankalis. The Kipchaks might have been mentioned as Turk-Kibchak in the 8th century Moyun Chur inscription, though this was uncertain as only the letters 𐰲𐰴 (čq *čaq?) were readable on the damaged inscription; they were first definitely mentioned in the 9th century by Ibn Khordadbeh, who placed them next to the Toquz Oghuz, while Al-Biruni claimed that the Qun were further east of them. Habash al-Hasib al-Marwazi writes that the Qun came from the lands of Cathay which they fled from in fear of the Khitans. This may have been what the Armenian chronicler Matthew of Edessa was referring to when he recounted Pale Ones being driven out by the people of the Snakes, whom Golden identified as a Mongolic or para-Mongolic people known as Qay in Arabic, Tatabï in Old Turkic, and Kumo Xi in Chinese language.

==== Kimek ====
In the mid-9th century, the Kimek-Kipchak confederation emerged in the northern steppes stretching from Lake Balkhash in the east to the Aral Sea in the west. They were a confederation of seven minor tribes: Yemeks, Imur, Tatars, Bayandur, Kipchaks, Lanikaz, and Ajlad; and whose leader held the title of "Shad Tutuk", derived from the Middle Chinese military title tuo-tuok 都督 'military governor' (> standard Chinese: dūdū), but started using the title of "Yabgu" instead when remnants of the Uyghur Khaganate fled to them in 840. By the early 10th century, the Kimeks bordered the Oghuz to the south, where the Ural formed the boundary. According to the Hudud al-'Alam, written in the 10th century, the Kimeks used the title of Khagan. They were the most removed from the sedentary civilization of all the Turks and had only one town within their territory. In the 11th century, the Kimeks were displaced by the Cumans.

=== Later Turkic peoples ===
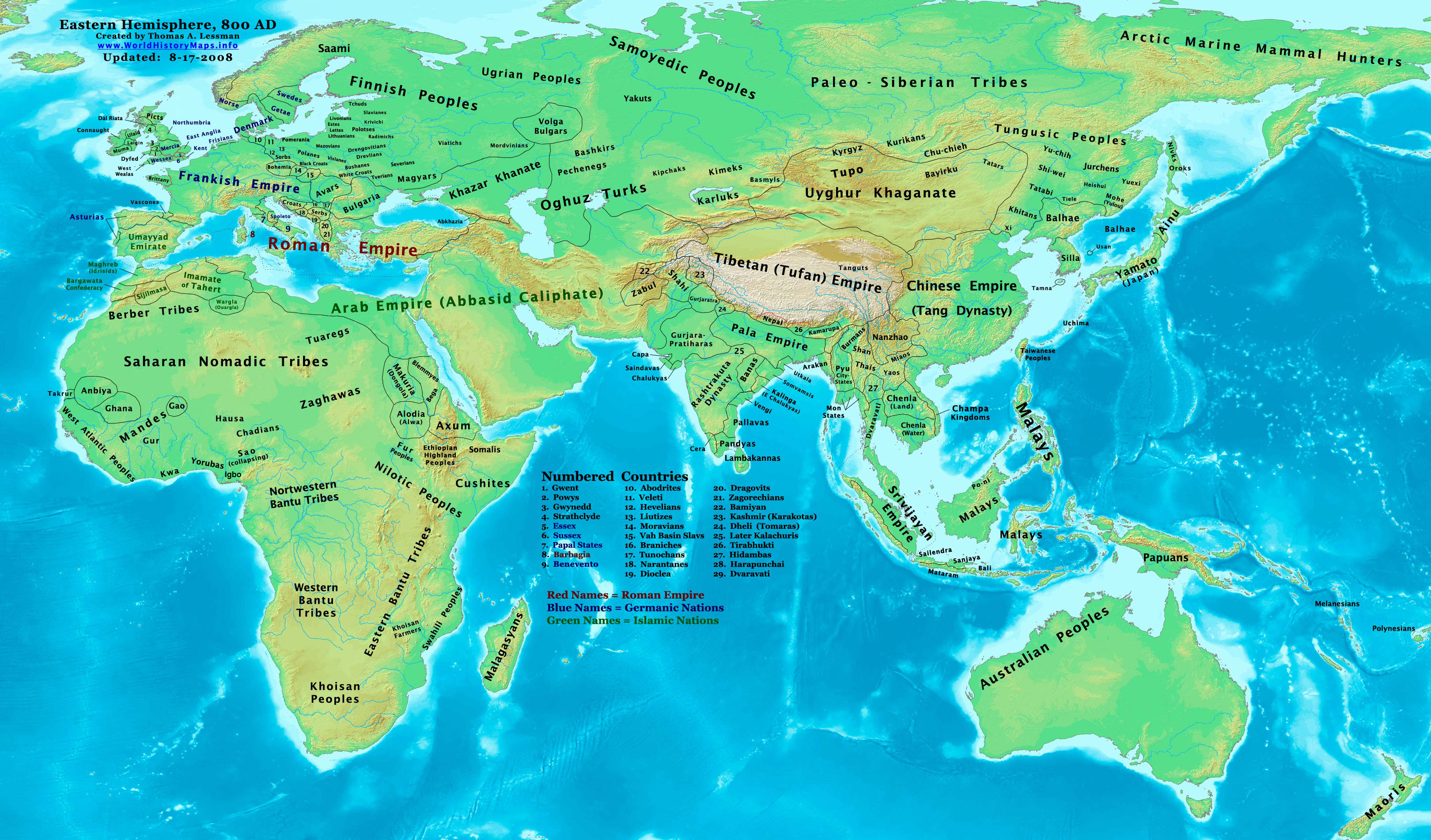
Uyghur Khaganate in geopolitical context c. AD 800

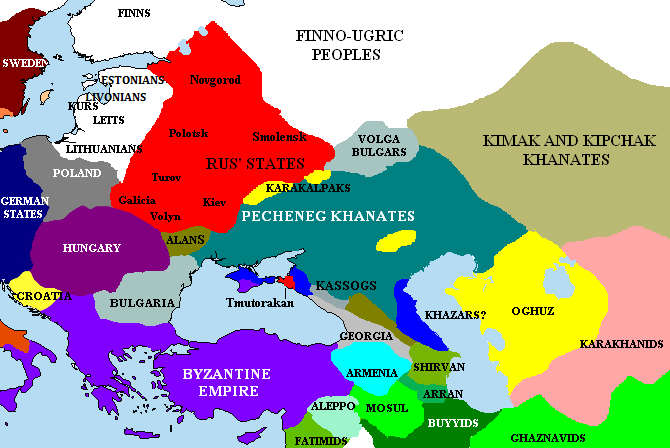
The Pontic steppes, c. 1015

Later Turkic peoples include the Khazars, Turkmens: either Karluks (mainly 8th century) or Oghuz Turks, Uyghurs, Yenisei Kyrgyz, Pechenegs, Cumans-Kipchaks, etc. As these peoples were founding states in the area between Mongolia and Transoxiana, they came into contact with Muslims, and most gradually adopted Islam. However, most groups of Turkic people who belonged to other religions, including Christians, Judaists, Buddhists, Manichaeans, and Zoroastrians continued to exist in smaller numbers, up until the Mongol Invasions of Inner and Central Asia.

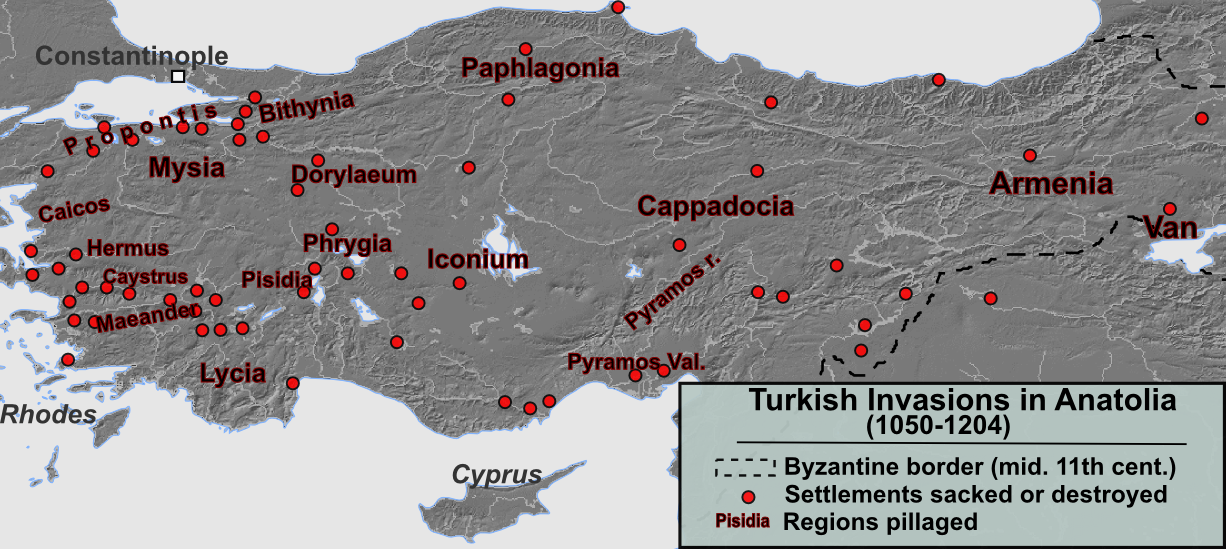
Settlements and regions affected during the first wave of Turkish invasions in Asia Minor (11th–13th century). In the ten years following the Battle of Manzikert in 1071, the Seljuk Turks from Central Asia migrated over large areas of Anatolia.

==== Turkmens ====
While the Karakhanid state remained in this territory until its conquest by Genghis Khan, the Turkmen group of tribes was formed around the core of the Karluks and the more westward Oghuzes. The current majority view for the etymology of the name is that it comes from Türk and the Turkic emphasizing suffix -men, meaning 'most Turkish of the Turks' or 'pure-blooded Turks.' Thus, the ethnic consciousness among some, but not all Turkic tribes as "Turkmens" in the Islamic era came long after the fall of the non-Muslim Gokturk (and Eastern and Western) Khanates.

Turkic soldiers in the army of the Abbasid caliphs emerged as the de facto rulers of much of the Muslim Middle East (apart from Syria and North Africa) from the 13th century. The Oghuz and other tribes captured and dominated various countries under the leadership of the Seljuk dynasty, and eventually captured the territories of the Abbasid dynasty and the Byzantine Empire.

Meanwhile, the Kyrgyz and Uyghurs were struggling with one another and with the Chinese Empire. The Kyrgyz people ultimately settled in the region now referred to as Kyrgyzstan. The Batu hordes conquered the Volga Bulgars in what is today Tatarstan and Kypchaks in what is now Southern Russia, following the westward sweep of the Mongols in the 13th century. Other Bulgars settled in Europe in the seventh and eighth centuries, but were assimilated by the Slavs, giving the name to the Bulgarians and the Slavic Bulgarian language.

It was under Seljuq suzerainty that numerous Turkmen tribes, especially those that came through the Caucasus via Azerbaijan, acquired fiefdoms (beyliks) in newly conquered areas of Anatolia, Iraq and even the Levant. Thus, the ancestors of the founding stock of the modern Turkish nation were most closely related to the Oghuz Turkmen groups that settled in the Caucasus and later became the Azerbaijani nation.

By early modern times, the name Turkestan has several definitions:

1. land of sedentary Turkic-speaking townspeople that have been subjects of the Central Asian Chagatayids, i.e. Sarts, Central Asian Mughals, Central Asian Timurids, Taranchi of Chinese Turkestan, and the later invading East Kipchak Tatars who mixed with local Sarts and Chagatais to form the Uzbeks; This area roughly coincides with Khorasan in the widest sense, plus Tarim Basin which was known as Chinese Turkestan. It is ethnically diverse, and includes homelands of non-Turkic peoples like the Tajiks, Pashtuns, Dungans, and Dzungars. Turkic peoples of the Kypchak branch, i.e. Kazakhs and Kyrgyz, are not normally considered Turkestanis but are also populous (as pastoralists) in many parts of Turkestan.
2. a specific district governed by a 17th-century Kazakh Khan, in modern-day Kazakhstan, which were more sedentary than other Kazakh areas, and were populated by towns-dwelling Sarts

The Salars are descended from Turkmen who migrated from Central Asia and settled in a Tibetan area of Qinghai under Ming Chinese rule. The Salar ethnicity formed and underwent ethnogenesis from a process of male Turkmen migrants from Central Asia marrying Amdo Tibetan women during the early Ming dynasty.

== See also ==
- Migration Period
- Middle Ages
- Nomadic empire
- Eurasian nomads
- Turkic tribal confederations
- History of Central Asia
- Hephthalites
- Xionites
- Tatar invasions
- Turco-Mongol tradition
- Pre-modern human migration
