= Ongal =

- Settlement

Area
  - Total: 48 km^{2} (19 sq mi)

Ongal (or Onglos) was the first settlement of the Asparuh Bulgars after their settlement on the Lower Danube in the second half of the 7th century.

The Ongal began as a fortified camp with an area of 48 km². The location of the Ongal is described by Byzantine chroniclers Theophanes the Confessor and Nikephoros I of Constantinople.

== History ==
More than 3,000 years ago, Ongal was home to the Moesi who were subdued by the Roman general Crassus around 29 BC. The political independence of Old Great Bulgaria, like other nomadic state formations, did not last long. United by Khan Kubrat, the Bulgar tribes quickly divided after his death sometime around 660. Most of the Asparuh Bulgars settled in the area around the Ongal, called Scythia Minor.

== See also ==
- Battle of Ongal
- Peuce Island

== Sources ==
- История на България 2003, ISBN 954528613X,проф. д-р Георги Бакалов и проф. д-р Милен Куманов
