= Dulo =

Bulgar Clan

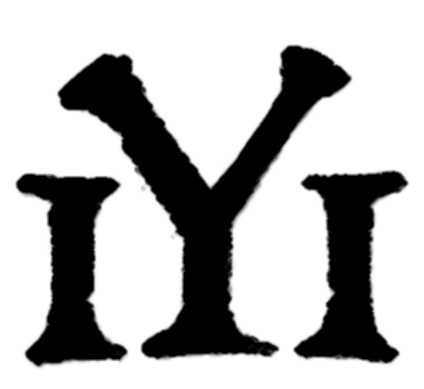
Tamgha of the Dulo clan.

The Dulo or To-lu (Old Turkic: 𐱅𐰇𐰼𐰆𐰸, romanized: *Tör-ok) (Middle Chinese 咄陸 *tuɑt̚-lɨuk̚ > Mandarin Duōlù) was a ruling dynasty of the Bulgars, who were of Turkic origin. It is generally considered that their elite was related to the Huns and the Western Turkic Khaganate. Particularly, it is said that the Dulo descended from the rulers of Old Great Bulgaria. This state was a centralized monarchy from its inception, unlike previous Hunno-Turkic political entities, which were tribal confederations.

The royal family and rulers of Old Great Bulgaria (632–668) and the first half of the First Bulgarian Empire (681–1018), in their prince lists (Nominalia of the Bulgarian khans) claimed through descent from Attila through Irnik, possibly Attila's attested son Ernak. During the pagan period, the succession of clan leadership was based on traditions brought over to the Balkans from the Eurasian Steppe, which include the rulers' divine ancestry. At the head of the clan was the Khan, who reigned as the head of state, military leader, and probably high priest of the Bulgar god, Tangra.

== Research history ==
Most of what is known about the clan is written in the Nominalia of the Bulgarian khans. The Nominalia lists as the first ruler mythical Avitohol, who lived 300 years and descended from the Dulo clan. Josef Marquart and many other historians identified Avitohol with Attila the Hun. Steven Runciman considered the connection possible, but suspicious and unimportant if the link between Irnik-Ernak is confirmed. Runciman considered the name Avitohol meaningless and its biblical origin more convincing. He considered that the missionaries were spreading Old Testament stories around the Eurasian Steppes, as well the story of Japheth, the ancestor of Eurasian people, which easily modifies into the Latin name Avitus (ancestral; grandfather) and Turkish Awit (ancestor) it derives from. Runciman considered Avitohol to be a distant mythological ancestor. Ivan Biliarsky considers that both Avitohol and Irnik were only mythic figures of the historical personalities. According to him the Nominalia shows that the clan memory and genealogy important to Central Asian peoples was likewise significant to the Bulgars, as well the cosmological understanding of the history, as the Avitohol and Irnik were mentioned in the category of the creator and founder, the mythological divine ancestor-creator represented in the reincarnation of the cultural hero within time cycles. Jean W. Sedlar considered the Attila connection justly doubtful, and argued the possibility of a steppe dynasty which produced Hunnic rulers like Attila may have also produced rulers for the Bulgars.

The second listed ruler is Irnik, who lived 150 years and also descended from the Dulo clan. It is generally considered that in the Nominalia under Irnik was considered the third son of Attila, Ernak. Vasil Zlatarski thought the identification between Irnik and Ernak pointless, and they were two different persons and families. Zlatarski pointed out, which points Runciman considered to be indisputable; if Irnik was Ernak, then both Ernak and Attila belonged to the Dulo clan, whereas, actually, no source mentions Dulo clan in connection with them; according to the Nominalia Irnik ruled from 437, i.e. several years before the death of Attila in 453, which is impossible. Due to be assigned a reign of 150 years, Runciman considered the inaccuracy of the date of accession as venial mistake.

Kurt (Kubrat; c. 632–665), a member of the clan, revolted against the Pannonian Avars and founded the Old Great Bulgaria on the territory of modern Ukraine. During the second half of the 7th century his sons split up the Bulgar royal family and spread over Europe, from the Volga river to the shadow of Matese mountains: Bezmer (Ukraine), Kotrag (Volga Bulgaria), Kuber (Balkan Macedonia), Asparukh (Danube Bulgaria) and Alcek (Sepino, Bojano, Isernia). In the Nominalia the Bezmer (c. 665–668) was the last Dulo ruler on the northern side of Danube river (of the Old Great Bulgaria), while the Asparukh (c. 681–701) was the first from the southern side of the river (First Bulgarian Empire). He was followed by Tervel (c. 700–721), and the last ruler of Bulgaria from the Dulo clan, Sevar (c. 721–737). According to Theophanes, in 761 or 762 the Bulgars "rose up, killed their hereditary lords and set up as their king an evil-minded man called Teletzes, who was 30 years old". Historians usually interpreted the testimony as evidence of a massacre of the previous dynasty (the Dulo clan), and the rise of a new leader with no connection to the previous regime.

=== Origin ===
The exact origin is obscure. Some researchers consider that the origin of the clan most probably was Turkic. This proposition was suggested by Mikhail Artamonov, and was prompted by Lev Gumilev (1967), implying there may be made an association of the Dulo clan with the five Duolu (or To-lu) tribes of the Western Turks. The First Turkic Khaganate (552–581) dissolved during the Göktürk civil war (581–593) and divided into Western and Eastern Khaganates. The Western was led by Onoq (ten arrows), the five Duolu and five Nushibi tribes. Many modern historians consider that the first historical Bulgar ruler Kubrat belonged to the Dulo clan of the Western Turks - the so-called alliance of Onogurs and Bulgars. B. Zhivkov emphasized that Duolu and Nushibi were tribal confederations, and not ruling dynasties.

Some historians have even identified the Western qaghan Moheduo (Külüg Sibir) with Organa, the maternal uncle of Kubrat. Accurately or not, it still points to the rivalry between the Bulgars, led by Kubrat from the Dulo clan, and the Khazars, led by the Ashina clan.

Omeljan Pritsak further considered the connection of the name of Dulo clan with the name of the old Xiongnu ruling house 屠各 Tuge (in Old Chinese d'o-klâk). This association could further prove the link between Xiongnu and Huns (as well Huns and Bulgars). Peter B. Golden surmises that the Xiongnu tribal surname 獨孤 Dugu (< d'uk-kuo) or 屠各 Tuge (< d'o-klâk) possibly reflects underlying Turkic *Tuğqu or *Tuğlağ "tribe of the tuğ?" yet still considers the Turkic association as speculative.

Mercia MacDermott claimed that the Dulo clan had the dog as its sacred animal. MacDermott considered that the Bulgarian expression preserved to this day "he kills the dog", in the meaning "he gives the orders", is a relic of the time when the Dulo Khan sacrificed a dog to the deity Tangra in the name of the whole community.

Some modern Bulgarian scholars, the most prominent of them, namely Peter Dobrev, argued that the Turkic names of the animals in the Bulgar calendar (also found in the Nominalia) show that the Turkic peoples had borrowed these words from the Iranian language (Bulgars). However, according to Raymond Detrez, this theory is rooted in the periods of anti-Turkish sentiment in Bulgaria, and is ideologically motivated. As such the proto-Bulgar language (of the group which established the state of Bulgaria), was claimed to be of Iranian language although it is generally accepted it was Turkic of Oghuric branch and related to modern Chuvash.

Aleksandar Burmov noted that the medieval writers under various names mentioned Huns and Bulgars, and some authors mentioned them as separate ethnic categories. The cases of mixing information for Bulgars and Huns in some authors, as well as possible rapprochement of the names Avitohol – Attila and Irnik – Ernak, do not give reason to draw a line of equality between the two ethnic groups. According to Burmov there is no historical evidence that the Bulgars and Huns lived in the same territory. Burmov, Peter B. Golden, Gyula Németh and Panos Sophoulis concluded that claiming of Attilid descent shows the intermingling of European Huns elements with newly arrived Oğuric Turkic groups, as the number of evidence of linguistic, ethnographic and socio-political nature show that Bulgars belonged to the group of Turkic peoples.

=== Etymology ===
B. Simeonov derived Dulu from Turkic dul/tul (big, powerful, giant; war horse), and saw Dulo as partly Slavicized form. Simeonov derived *Dullu from Old Hunnic dul + lu (mounted, horseman), yet according to Peter B. Golden, no such Hunnic word is attested. According to G. Clauson, Old Turkic tul denotes "widow, widower". Golden, citing Lajos Ligeti (1986), wondered if Dulo resulted from Slavicism of Turkic title Yula. Even so, all hypotheses P. B. Golden considers for now as speculative.

== Legacy ==
Dulo Hill on Livingston Island, near Antarctica, is named after the Bulgarian ruling dynasty Dulo.
