= Battle of Ongal =

680 battle of the Byzantine-Bulgarian Wars

- Part of the Byzantine–Bulgarian wars
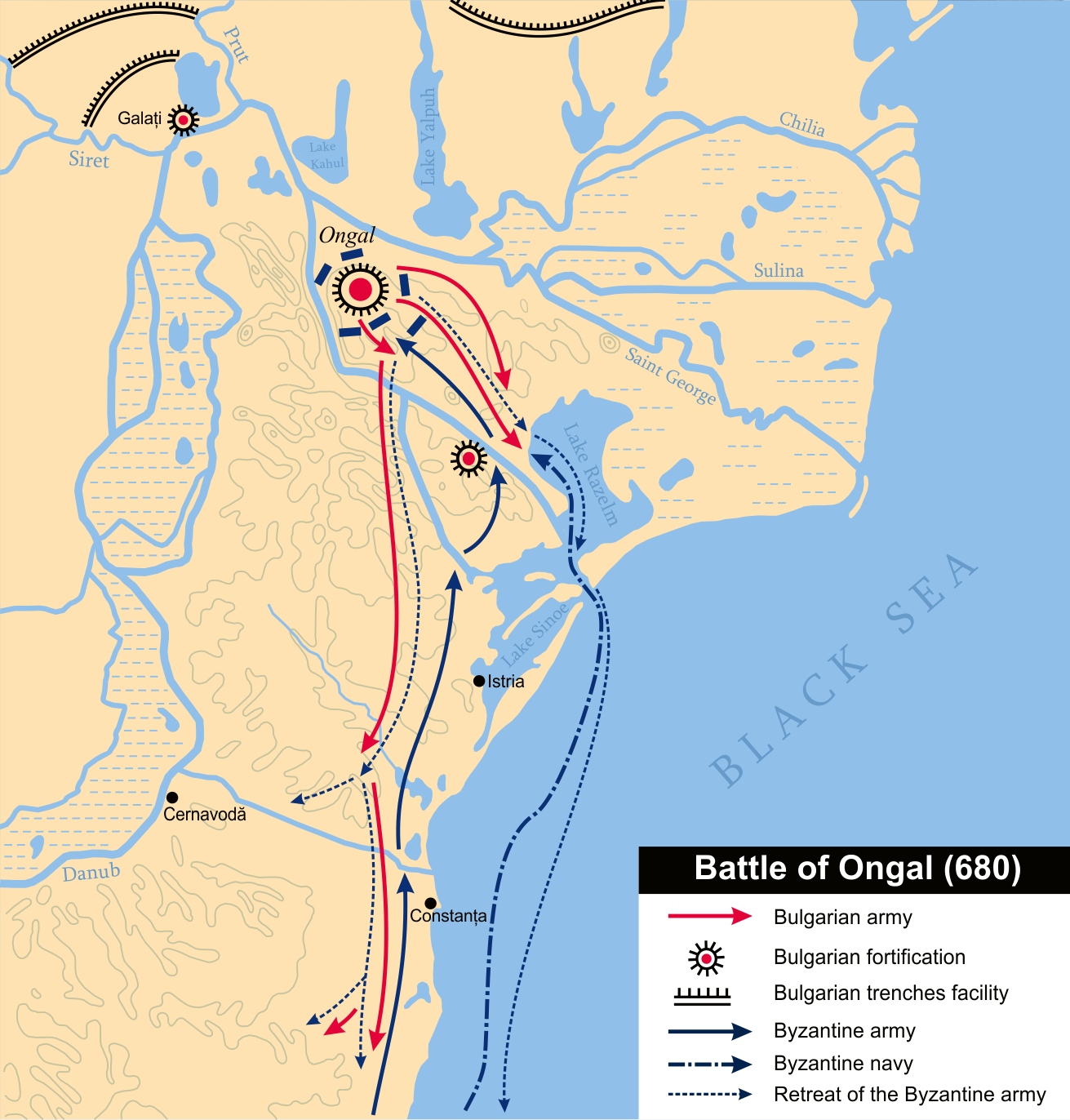
- The foundation of the First Bulgarian Empire. The army of Asparukh is in red. The army of Constantine IV is in blue.
Date	Summer, 680
Location	The Ongal area probably in Danube Delta (present-day Tulcea County, Romania)
Result	Bulgar victory
Territorial changes	Formation of Danube Bulgaria

Belligerents
Bulgars; Seven Slavic tribes	Byzantine Empire

Commanders and leaders
Asparukh	Constantine IV

Strength
Around 10,000–12,000	"all the themata" from 15 – 25,000

Casualties and losses
Light	Heavy

The Battle of Ongal took place in the summer of 680 in the Ongal area, an unspecified location in and around the Danube Delta near the Peuce Island, present-day Tulcea County, Romania. It was fought between the Bulgars of Asparuh of Bulgaria, who had recently invaded the Balkans, and the Byzantine Empire, which ultimately lost the battle. The battle was crucial for the creation of the First Bulgarian Empire.

== Origins of the conflict ==
In 632, Khan Kubrat united the Bulgars into the state of Old Great Bulgaria along the coasts of the Black Sea and Caspian Sea. After his death in the 660s his sons divided his kingdom amongst themselves. Batbayan, the eldest son, inherited the throne in Poltava but was defeated by and submitted to the rule of his ambitious brother Cozarig (Kotrag) who had undermined the state's unity by leading his Don-Volga "Kutrigs" in expansion campaigns extending his empire to the north where Volga Bulgaria would eventually form. The third son Asparuh marched westward and settled in the Ongal area on the eastern banks of the Danube. Eventually the Avars fought back and after Asparuh consolidated his rule, the Bulgars launched an attack against the Byzantine lands to the south.

During that time the Byzantine Empire was at war with the Arabs who had recently besieged the capital Constantinople. However, in 680 the Byzantines defeated the Arabs and concluded a peace treaty. After this success the emperor Constantine IV was free to move against the Bulgars and led an army against Asparuh. In the meantime the Bulgar leader made an alliance with the Seven Slavic tribes for mutual protection against the Byzantines and formed a federation.

== Battle ==
According to the Chronicles of Nikephoros I of Constantinople:

When Constantine (IV) became aware that the nation (of Bulgars) which had settled by the Istros was attempting to devastate by its incursions the neighboring places that were under Roman rule, he conveyed an army to Thrace and, furthermore, fitted out a fleet and set out to ward off that nation. On seeing the multitude of cavalry and ships and amazed as they were by the unexpected suddenness (of the attack), the Bulgarians fled to their fortifications and remained four days there. Since, however, the Romans were unable to engage them in battle because of the difficulty of the terrain, they regained strength and eagerness. Now the emperor was seized by an attack of gout and being in much pain, sailed off to the city of Mesembria for treatment after giving orders to the officers and soldiers to keep on investing the fort and do whatever was necessary to oppose the nation. But a rumor spread about that the emperor had fled and, being on this account thrown into confusion, they fled headlong although no one was on their heels. Seeing this, the Bulgarians pursued them in strength, killing those they caught and wounding many others. After crossing the Istros in the direction of Varna, which is near Odyssos, and perceiving how strong and secure was the inland area thanks to the river and the great difficulty of the terrain, they settled there.

— Patriarch Nikephoros, The Breviarium (of Patriarch Nikephoros of Constantinople), pages 36-37.

The Bulgars had built wooden ramparts in the swampy area near the Peuce Island. The marshes forced the Byzantines to attack from a weakened position and in smaller groups, which reduced the strength of their attack. With continuing attacks from the ramparts, the Bulgar defense eventually forced the Byzantines into a rout, followed up by the Bulgar cavalry. Many of the Byzantine soldiers perished. According to popular belief, the emperor had leg pain and went to Aquae Calidae to seek treatment. The troops thought that he fled the battlefield and in turn began fleeing. When the Bulgars realised what was happening, they attacked and defeated their discouraged enemy.

== Aftermath ==
After the victory, the Bulgars advanced south and seized the lands to the north of Stara Planina. In 681 they invaded Thrace defeating the Byzantines again. Constantine IV found himself in a dead-lock and asked for peace.

== Significance ==
This battle was a significant moment in European history, as it led to the creation of a powerful state, which was to become a European medieval great power in the 9th and 10th centuries along with the Byzantine and Frankish Empires. It became a cultural and spiritual centre of South Slavic Europe through most of the Middle Ages.

== Honour ==
Ongal Peak in Tangra Mountains on Livingston Island in the South Shetland Islands, Antarctica is named for the historical Ongal area.
