= Gostun =

Bulgar regent

Gostun was a regent over the Bulgars for 2 years.

Little else is known about him. It is possible that Gostun is an alternative name of Organa, who according to some Byzantine sources was a regent over the Bulgars until Kubrat's return from Constantinople and was also member of the Ermi clan.

Gostun Point on Snow Island in the South Shetland Islands, Antarctica is named after Gostun.

== See also ==
- Nominalia of the Bulgarian Khans

Preceded by Organa	Bulgarian Ruler	Succeeded by Kubrat
