= Balkan–Danubian culture =

Archaeological culture from Europe

The Balkan–Danubian culture was an early medieval archaeological culture which emerged in the region of the Lower Danube in the 8th century and flourished until the 11th century. In Bulgaria it is usually referred to as the Pliska–Preslav culture, while in Romania it is called the Dridu culture. It is better represented in the territory of modern-day Central and Northern Bulgaria, although it probably spread north of the Danube as well due to the continuous extension of the First Bulgarian Empire over the territory of present-day Romania.

== Description ==
The Balkan–Danubian culture is described as an early Slavic-Bulgar culture, but besides Slavic and Bulgar elements it also possesses some Romance components. However, this only appears in the southern regions of what is now southern Bulgaria, all of which were heavily influenced by the Byzantine Empire. Famous examples of this architecture are the early Bulgarian capitals of Pliska and Preslav, in addition to the Palace of Omurtag and the Murfatlar Cave Complex. Some scholars partition this culture in two subgroups. Because the Byzantine influence was stronger in the south, the northern finds are entirely Slavic with some Turkic impression.

== See also ==
- Bulgarian lands across the Danube
- First Bulgarian Empire
- Golden Age of Bulgaria
- Slavic influence on Romanian
- Romanian Cyrillic alphabet

== Sources ==
- Curta, Florin (2006). Southeastern Europe in the Middle Ages, 500-1250. Cambridge University Press. ISBN 978-0-521-89452-4.
- Fiedler, Uwe (2008). "Bulgars in the Lower Danube region: A survey of the archaeological evidence and of the state of current research". In Curta, Florin; Kovalev, Roman (eds.). The Other Europe in the Middle Ages: Avars, Bulgars, Khazars, and Cumans. Brill. pp. 151–236. ISBN 978-90-04-16389-8.
- Madgearu, Alexandru (2005). The Romanians in the Anonymous Gesta Hungarorum: Truth and Fiction. Romanian Cultural Institute, Center for Transylvanian Studies. ISBN 973-7784-01-4.
- Madgearu, Alexandru (2007). “The Dridu Culture and the changing position of Romania among the Communist states”, Archaeologia Bulgarica, 11-2 (2007): 51-59. Archived 2021-08-02 at the Wayback Machine
- Opreanu, Coriolan Horaţiu (2005). "The North-Danube Regions from the Roman Province of Dacia to the Emergence of the Romanian Language (2nd–8th Centuries AD)". In Pop, Ioan-Aurel; Bolovan, Ioan (eds.). History of Romania: Compendium. Romanian Cultural Institute (Center for Transylvanian Studies). pp. 59–132. ISBN 978-973-7784-12-4.
- Spinei, Victor (2009). The Romanians and the Turkic Nomads North of the Danube Delta from the Tenth to the Mid-Thirteenth century. Koninklijke Brill NV. ISBN 978-90-04-17536-5.
