= Old Great Bulgaria =

632–668 nomadic empire in Eastern Europe

- 632–668
- Monogram of bulgar khan Kubrat

- Old Great Bulgaria
- Capital: Phanagoria (632–665)
- Common languages: Bulgar
- Religion: Tengrism
- Demonym: Bulgar
- Government: Absolute monarchy
- Khan
  - 632–665: Kubrat
  - 665–668: Batbayan
- Historical era: Middle Ages
  - Kubrat inherits the throne: 632
  - Batbayan inherits the throne: 665
  - Old Great Bulgaria is conquered by the Khazars: 668
Preceded by
Onogurs
Kazarig
Avar Khaganate
Succeeded by
First Bulgarian Empire
Volga Bulgaria
Khazar Khaganate
- Today part of: Russia; Ukraine

Old Great Bulgaria (Medieval Greek: Παλαιά Μεγάλη Βουλγαρία, Palaiá Megálē Voulgaría), also often known by the Latin names Magna Bulgaria and Patria Onoguria ("Onogur land"), was a 7th-century Turkic nomadic empire formed by the Onogur-Bulgars on the western Pontic–Caspian steppe (modern southern Ukraine and southwest Russia). Great Bulgaria was originally centered between the Dniester and lower Volga.

The original capital was Phanagoria on the Taman Peninsula between the Black and Azov seas. In the mid-7th century, Great Bulgaria expanded west to include Avar territory and was centered on Poltava. During the late 7th century, however, an Avar-Slavic alliance in the west, and Khazars in the east, defeated the Bulgars, and Great Bulgaria disintegrated. Successor states are the First Bulgarian Empire and Volga Bulgaria.

== Origins ==
The etymology of the ethnonym Bulgar is not completely understood; it is difficult to trace the name back earlier than the 4th century AD. It is generally believed to derive from the Turkic verb bulğha (to "stir", "mix", "disturb", "confuse"), possibly suggesting that other Turkic peoples regarded the Bulgars as a "mixed" people, or as "rebellious".

Later Byzantine scholars implied that the Bulgars had previously been known as the Onogurs (Onoğur). Agathon wrote about the "nation of Onogur Bulğars", Nikephoros I stated that Kubrat was lord of the Onogundurs, Theophanes referred to them as Onogundur Bulgars and Constantine VII remarked that the Bulgars formerly called themselves Onogundurs. Variations of the name include Onoguri, Onoghuri, Onghur, Ongur, Onghuri, Onguri, Onogundur, Unogundur, and Unokundur. There are several theories about the origin of the name Onogur. In some Turkic languages on means "10" and ğur "arrow"; and "ten arrows" might imply a federation of ten tribes, i.e. the Western Turkic Khaganate. Within the Turkic languages, "z" sounds in the easternmost languages tend to have become "r" in the westernmost Turkic languages; therefore, the ethnonym Oghuz may be the source of Oghur; that is, on Oğur would mean "ten clans of Oghuz".

== Establishment ==
Between 630 and 635, Khan Kubrat managed to unite the Onogur Bulgars with the tribes of the Kutrigurs and Utigurs under a single rule, creating a powerful confederation which was referred to by the medieval authors in Western Europe as Old Great Bulgaria, or Patria Onoguria. According to some scholars, it is more correctly called the Onogundur-Bulgar Empire.

Some scholars assume that it stretched as far west as the Pannonian Plain and included among its subjects some of the Pannonian Avars. It is presumed that Kubrat's capital was the ancient city of Phanagoria on the Taman Peninsula. Kubrat's grave was discovered in 1912 at Pereshchepina, Ukraine.

=== Khan Kubrat ===
According to the Nominalia of the Bulgarian khans, Kubrat was from the royal clan Dulo and a rightful heir to the Bulgar throne. He was awarded the title of honorary patrician by the Byzantine emperor Heraclius. Hermann Zotenberg (1883), while translating John of Nikiu's Chronicles from Old Ethiopian, intentionally replaced the name Qetrades to Kubrat. Since then, the historiography holds a misconception that Kubrat was raised and baptized by the Byzantine court, while John's character Qetrades has no real-life connection to the ruler of the Great Bulgaria Kubrat.

Kubrat quickly managed to overthrow Avar domination, extending Onogur influence among the Bulgars in Pannonia in what became known as Hungary. Ultimately, although there is no evidence that the Utigurs were independent of the Onogurs until after Kubrat's empire disintegrated, it is believed he seceded from the Onogurs when they became entangled in dynastic wars. After Kubrat's burial in Mala Pereshchepina, the Khazars, who had triumphed in the collapse of Onoguria, subjugated Kubrat's eldest son and heir Batbayan, forcing his other sons to flee north up the Volga (2nd son Kotrag) and west into the Balkans (4th son Kuber and 3rd son Asparukh) and Italy (5th son Alcek, Alzek)

== Disintegration ==
The events following Kubrat's death are described by the Byzantine Patriarch Nikephoros I. In the times of Emperor Constantine IV, he narrates, Kubrat died and Batbayan, the eldest of his five sons, was left in charge of the state. Under strong Khazar pressure, Kubrat's other sons disregarded their father's advice to stay together in order to resist the enemies and soon departed, taking their own tribes.

Old Great Bulgaria disintegrated under Khazar pressure in 668.

== Aftermath ==
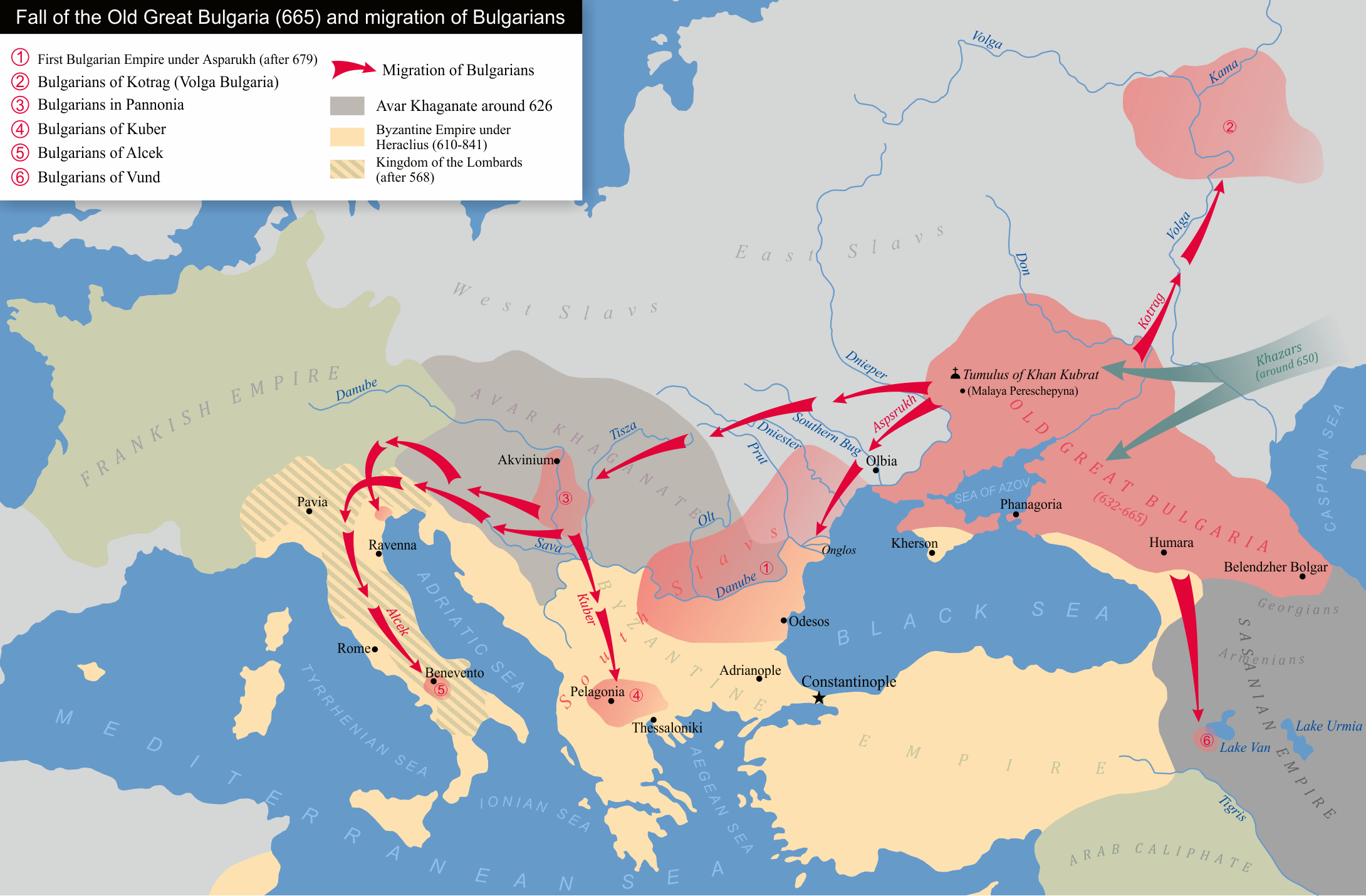
Bulgar settlements in the 6th and 7th centuries

Some Bulgars remained in the former Onoguria, under the domination of the Khazars.

=== Balkars ===
Some also believe that the present-day Balkars of the Caucasus are the descendants of the Batbayan horde even though they speak a Turkic language of the Kipchak type.

=== Volga Bulgars ===
After Kotrag, the leader of the Kutrigurs, took control of the western steppe, Batbayan led them into the upper Volga-Ural region. There they established Volga Bulgaria, at the confluence of the Volga and Kama. As the Volga or Silver Bulgars (Bessermens), they converted voluntarily to Islam in the 9th century. They managed to preserve their national identity well into the 13th century, by repelling the first Mongol attacks in 1223. However, they were eventually subdued, their capital Bolghar city became one of the major cities of the Golden Horde of the Mongols and the Bulgars mixed with the Tatars. The citizens of the modern Russian republics of Tatarstan and Chuvashia are considered to be descendants of those Bulgars.

=== Bulgars in Vojvodina and Macedonia ===
Kuber ruled in Sirmium over a mixed group of peoples – Bulgars, Byzantine subjects, Slavs, and Germanic tribes – as a vassal of the Avar Khagan. After a revolt, he led his people to Macedonia. There he settled in the region of Keremisia and made an unsuccessful attempt to capture the city of Thessaloniki. After this, he disappeared from history and his people were later consolidated into the First Bulgarian Empire by Khan Krum.

=== Bulgars in Italy ===
Other Bulgars, circa 662, led by their "Duke Alzeco" (Alcek) sought refuge from the Avars with the Lombards and requested land from the Lombard King Grimoald I in exchange for military service "for an uncertain reason", initially staying near Ravenna and later moving further south. Grimoald sent Alcek and his followers to his son Romuald in Benevento and they were then granted by Romuald land northeast of Naples in the "spacious but up till that time deserted" towns of Sepino, Bovianum (Boiano), and Isernia, in the present-day region of Molise in the Apennines. Instead of the title "Duke", Altzek was granted the Lombard title of "Gastald". Paul the Deacon in his Historia Langobardorum writing after the year 787 says that in his time Bulgars still inhabited the area, and that even though they speak "Latin", "they have not forsaken the use of their own tongue".

Excavations in the necropolis of Vicenne-Campochiaro near Boiano, which dates from the 7th century, found among 130 burials that there were 13 human burials alongside horses along with artefacts of Germanic and Avar origin. Horse burials are characteristic of Central Asian horse-nomads, and therefore these burials are clearly those of the Bulgar settlers of Molise and Campania.

=== First Bulgarian Empire ===
After the state disintegrated under the Khazar attack in 668, Asparukh parted ways with his brothers and led some of the Bulgars to seek a secure home. He was followed by 30,000 to 50,000 Bulgars.

After the Battle of Ongal, Asparukh founded the First Bulgarian Empire, which was officially recognized as an independent state by the Byzantine Empire in 681.

== See also ==
- Transdanubian Bulgaria
- Bulgarian epigraphic monuments

== Sources ==
- Bowersock, Glen; Brown, Peter; Grabar, Oleg (1999). Late Antiquity: A Guide to the Postclassical World. Harvard University Press. ISBN 9780674511736.
- Chen, Sanping (2012). Multicultural China in the Early Middle Ages. University of Pennsylvania Press. ISBN 978-0812206289.
- Fiedler, Uwe (2008). "Bulgars in the Lower Danube region: A survey of the archaeological evidence and of the state of current research". In Curta, Florin; Kovalev, Roman (eds.). The Other Europe in the Middle Ages: Avars, Bulgars, Khazars and Cumans. Brill. pp. 151–236. ISBN 9789004163898.
- Golden, Peter Benjamin (1992). An introduction to the History of the Turkic peoples: ethnogenesis and state formation in medieval and early modern Eurasia and the Middle East. Wiesbaden: Otto Harrassowitz. ISBN 9783447032742.
- Golden, Peter B. (2011). Studies on the Peoples and Cultures of the Eurasian Steppes. Editura Academiei Române; Editura Istros a Muzeului Brăilei. ISBN 9789732721520.
- Maenchen-Helfen, Otto John (1973), The World of the Huns: Studies in Their History and Culture, University of California Press, ISBN 9780520015968
