= Organa =

Bulgarian monarch

Organa (Alpo-Morgan) was Kubrat's maternal uncle of the Ermi clan. According to John of Nikiu, he was regent (kavkhan) over the tribe of the Onogur Bulgars from 617 to 630 in place of his nephew, Kubrat, for the time Kubrat was growing up as a hostage in the Byzantine Empire. There is information that Organa accompanied Kubrat on his initial trip to Constantinople. Some historians have identified Organa with Gostun and Western Turkic Baghatur Qaghan (莫賀咄可汗 Mòhèduō Kèhán). Panos Sophoulis considered that Organa is in fact a Turkic title (or-ḡan/qan) rather than a proper name.

== Honor ==
Organa Peak on Smith Island in Antarctica is named after Organa.

== See also ==
- Nominalia of the Bulgarian Khans

| Preceded by Bolgarios | Ruler in Onoguria | Succeeded by Gostun |
