= Asparuh of Bulgaria =

Founder of the First Bulgarian Empire

Asparuh
- Khan of Bulgaria
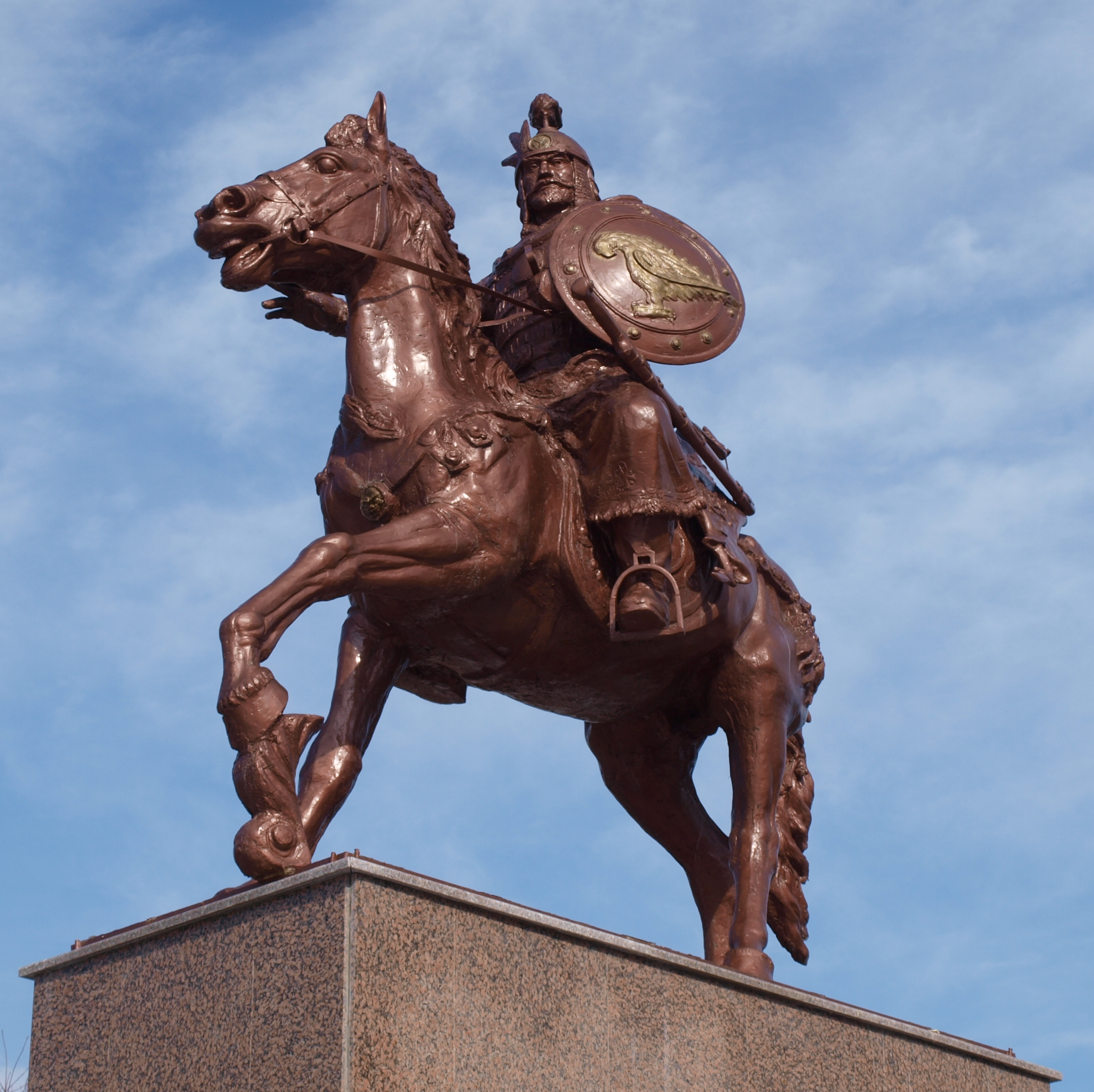
- Monument in Strelcha, Bulgaria

Khan of Bulgaria
- Reign: 681–701
- Predecessor: Kubrat
- Successor: Tervel
- Died: 701; Dnieper River
- Issue: Tervel; Ajjar
- House: Dulo
- Father: Kubrat
- Religion: Tengrism

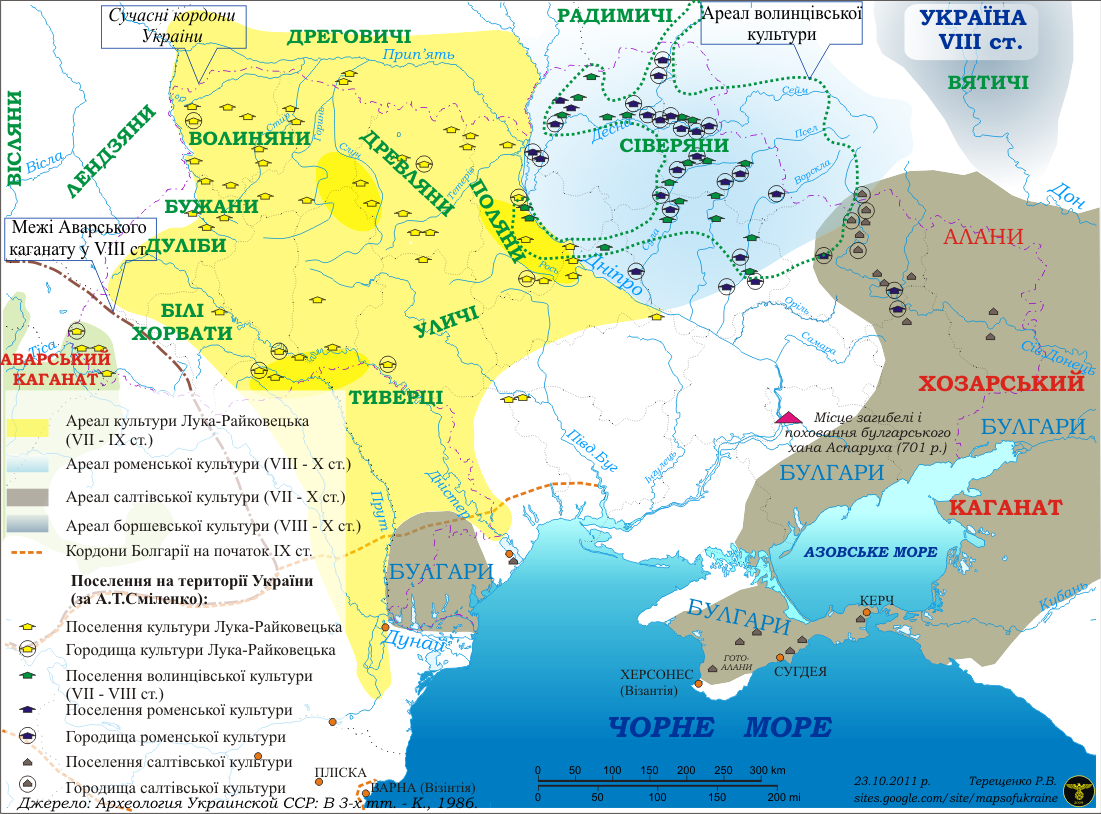
Map from Soviet book "Archeology of the Ukrainian SSR in 3 volumes", Kiev, 1986, showing place of the Asparuh's burial near the modern city of Zaporizhzhia.

Asparuh (also Ispor or (rarely) Isperih) was a Bulgar khan in the second half of the 7th century and is credited with the establishment of the First Bulgarian Empire in 681.

== Early life ==
The Nominalia of the Bulgarian Khans states that Asparuh belonged to the Dulo clan and reigned for 61 years. This long period cannot be accepted as accurate due to chronological constraints, and may indicate the length of Asparuh's life. According to the chronology developed by Moskov, Asparuh would have reigned 668–695. Other chronologies frequently end his reign in 700 or 701 but cannot be reconciled with the testimony of the Namelist. According to the Byzantine sources, Asparuh was a younger son of Kubrat, who had established a spacious state ("Great Bulgaria") in the steppes of modern Ukraine. Asparuh may have gained experience in politics and statesmanship during the long reign of his father, who probably died in 665 (apud Moskov). According to Djagfar Tarikhy (a work of disputed authenticity) Asparuh was made the leader of the Onogur tribe by his father. After his father's death, Asparuh would have acknowledged the rule of his older brother Bat Bayan, but the state disintegrated under Khazar attack in 668, and he and his brothers parted ways, leading their people to seek a more secure home in other lands.

The inclusion of other languages such as Hunnish, Khazar and Sabir within Oghur Turkic remains speculative owing to the paucity of historical records. Some scholars suggest Hunnish had strong ties with Bulgar and to modern Chuvash[5] and refer to this extended grouping as separate Hunno-Bulgar languages.[6][7] However, such speculations are not based on proper linguistic evidence, since the language of the Huns is almost unknown except for a few attested words, which are Indo-European in origin, and personal names.[a].

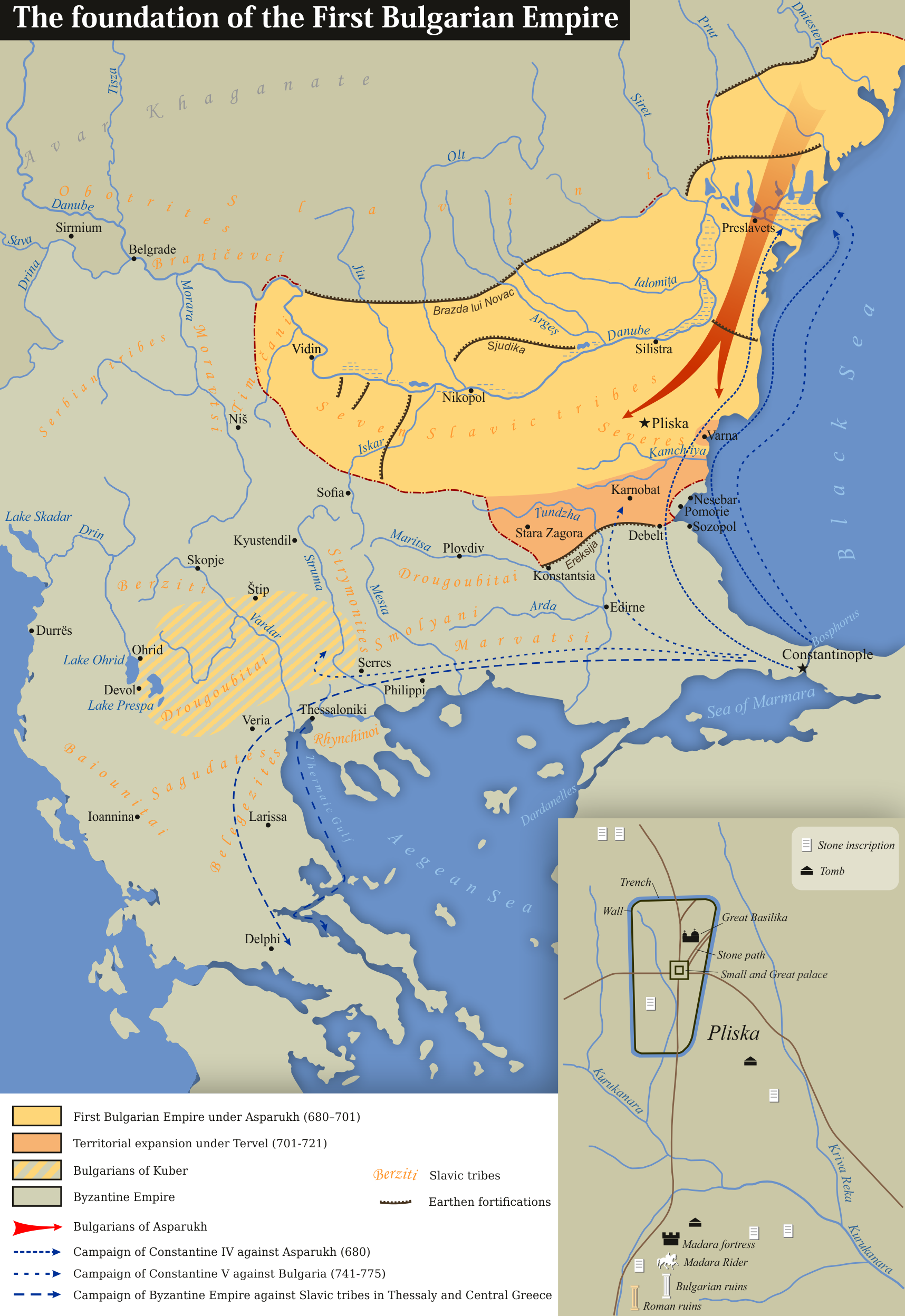
The foundation of the First Bulgarian Empire

== Establishment of the First Bulgarian Empire ==
Asparuh was followed by 30,000 to 50,000 Bulgars. He reached the Danube and while the Byzantine capital Constantinople was besieged by Muawiyah I, Caliph of the Arabs (674–678), he and his people settled in the Danube Delta, probably on the now-disappeared Peuce Island. After the Arab siege of Constantinople ended, the Byzantine Emperor Constantine IV marched against the Bulgars and their Slav allies in 680 and forced his opponents to seek shelter in a fortified encampment. Compelled to abandon the leadership of his army in order to seek medical treatment for his ailments in Anchialo (today's Pomorie), Constantine IV inadvertently demoralized his troops, who gave in to rumours that their emperor had fled. With segments of the Byzantine army starting to desert, the Bulgars and their allies broke through the blockade and routed their enemy at the Battle of Ongala in 680. Asparuh then swiftly moved from the Danubian delta down to the Balkan range.

== Reign ==
Monogram of Asparuh

Asparuh's victory led to the Bulgar conquest of Moesia and the establishment of some sort of alliance between the Bulgars and the local Slavic groups (described as the Severi and Seven Slavic tribes). As Asparuh commenced to raid across the mountains into Byzantine Thrace in 681, Constantine IV decided to cut his losses and conclude a treaty, whereby the Byzantine Empire paid the Bulgars an annual tribute. These events are seen in retrospect as the establishment of the Bulgarian state and its recognition by the Byzantine Empire. In later tradition Asparuh is credited with building the major centres of Pliska and Drăstăr, as well as at least one of the Bulgarian limes walls from the Danube to the Black Sea. While the multi-tribal and hegemonic character of the Bulgarian state in the first century or two after its establishment is readily apparent, Bulgarian historians have stressed the establishment of a capital and of a state tradition that could be viewed retrospectively as national. According to a late tradition, Asparuh died fighting the Khazars on the Danube. According to one theory, advanced by the Bulgarian historian Vaklinov, his grave is located near Voznesenka ("Ascension") on the Dnieper in Ukraine.

The town of Isperikh, several villages and Asparuh Peak on Livingston Island in the South Shetland Islands, Antarctica are named after Asparuh of Bulgaria.

== See also ==
- Asparukh (name)
- Aszparuh – 1981 epic film
- History of Bulgaria
- List of Bulgarian monarchs.

== Bibliography ==
- Fine, John V. A. Jr. (1991) [1983]. The Early Medieval Balkans: A Critical Survey from the Sixth to the Late Twelfth Century. Ann Arbor: University of Michigan Press. ISBN 0-472-08149-7.
- Mosko Moskov, Imennik na bălgarskite hanove (novo tălkuvane), Sofia 1988.
- Jordan Andreev, Ivan Lazarov, Plamen Pavlov, Koj koj e v srednovekovna Bălgarija, Sofia 1999.
- (primary source), Bahši Iman, Džagfar Tarihy, vol. III, Orenburg 1997.
- (primary source), Nikephoros Patriarch of Constantinople, Short History, C. Mango, ed., Dumbarton Oaks Texts 10, 1990.
- (primary source), The Chronicle of Theophanes Confessor, C. Mango and R. Scott, trans., Oxford University Press, 1997.
- Васил Н. Златарски, История на българската държава през средните векове, Част I, II изд., Наука и изкуство, София 1970, pp. 176–209.

Preceded by Bat Bayan	Khan of Bulgaria; 668–695	Succeeded by Tervel
