= Alcek =

Leader of Bulgars in Southern Italy

Alcek or Alzeco was allegedly a son of Kubrat and led the Bulgars to Ravenna that later settled in the villages of Gallo Matese, Sepino, Boiano and Isernia in the Matese mountains of southern Italy.

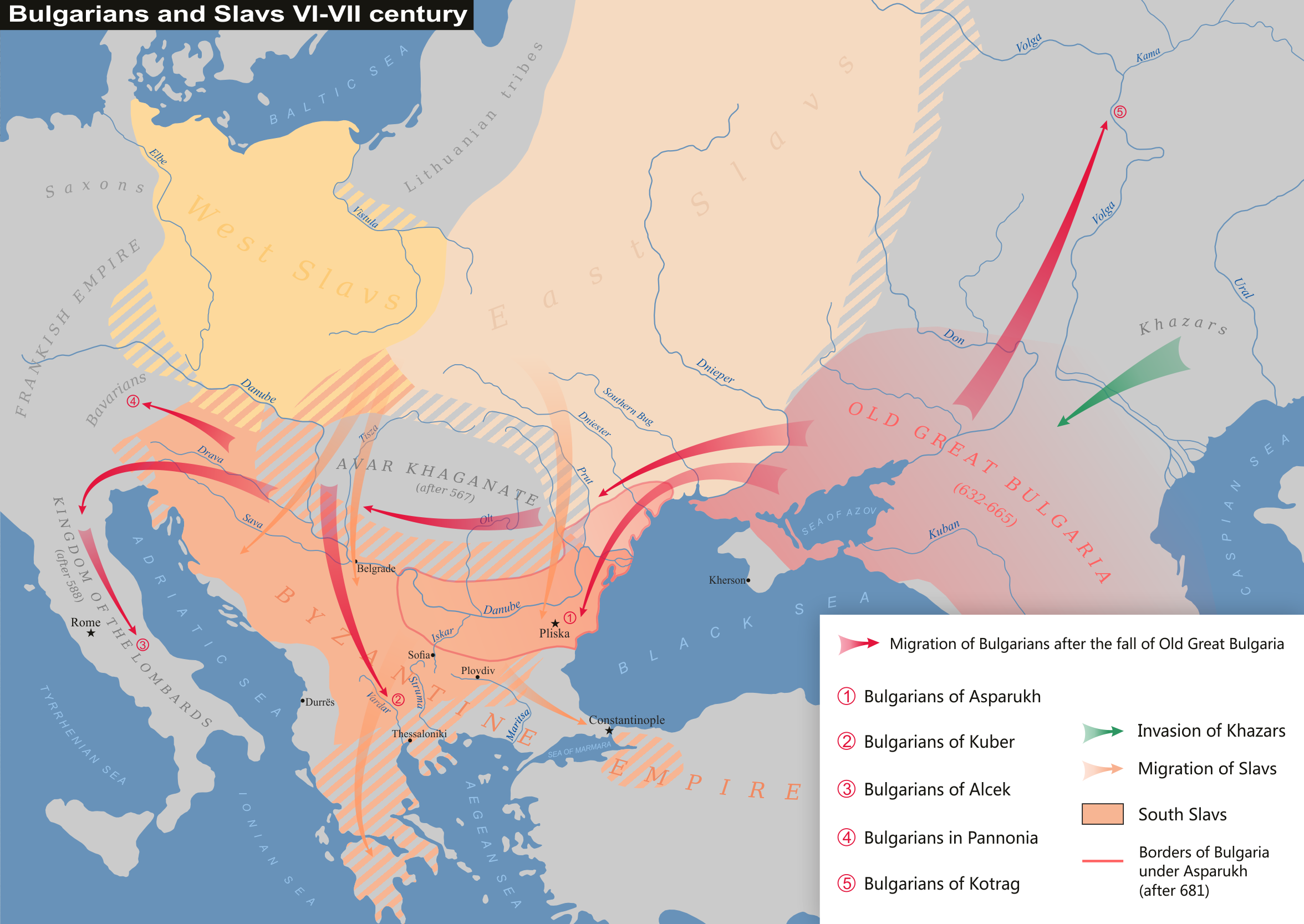
3 shows the Bulgars of Alzeco moving along Italy. 4 shows the earlier Pannonian Bulgars of Alciocus.

After the collapse of Old Great Bulgaria, some of the Bulgars, led by Alzeco, thought to be a son of Kubrat, settled in the lands of the Longobard Kingdom. Paul the Deacon places a settlement in his history of the migration of the Bulgars in the area of the Duchy of Benevento. Under the leadership of Alzeco, the Bulgars (called "Vulgars" by Paul) came to Italy in Benevento, where they settled in the Molise region.

== Alciocus ==
The earlier Khagan called Alciocus who was the leader of Bulgar hordes of the Avar Khanganate, is also known. The main source for these events is the medieval chronicle of Fredegar. In 623 Samo led a rebellion against the Pannonian Avars. Alciocus fled with 9,000 Bulgars to Bavaria where he asked the Frankish king Dagobert I for a piece of land to settle in. The king at first allowed them some land, but one night he ordered his army to slaughter the Bulgars. Only 700 out of 9,000 survived the slaughter and fled for protection to Valuk king of the Wends.

After the departure of Alciocus, Kubrat established peace between the Avars and Byzantium in 632.

== Alzeco ==
Although only three of Kubrat's sons are mentioned by name it has been suggested that Kubrat gave the name Alzeco to one of his other two sons.

After Kubrat's death over 40 years later, his empire was divided by his five sons in the 670s.

Alzeco gained permission from the King of the Lombards, Grimoald, to settle in the area of Ravenna. Eventually they were sent south into the Duchy of Benevento, where Alzeco was granted the rule of their settlements with the Longobard (Italian) title of gastald.

=== Italian archaeology ===
Human graves of a steppe-nomadic character as well as horse burials datable to the second half of the eighth century attest to the presence of Pannonian peoples in the Molise and Campania. In the lifetime of Paul the Deacon, he recorded that the descendants of these "Vulgars" still spoke their original language, as well as Latin.

== Alzeco as Alciocus ==
Researchers have, in the past, claimed one identification of both historical figures. They have suggested that Alzeco might be identified with the Bulgar leader Alciocus of the Fredegar chronicle. This notion, however, must surmount a significant chronological contradiction, and it is possible that this was a title rather than a personal name.

In any case, it seems more likely that the "Vulgares" that settled in the Molise are more likely to refer to the men of Alciocus, as most of the tombs excavated at Campochiaro can be dated around the middle of the 7th century, with some being certainly earlier or later. This would indicate a settlement in the area some time before the reign of Romuald as Duke in Benevento and Grimoald as king in Pavia. Furthermore, this is supported by the fact that the Longobards had no control of the Ravennate lands until the second half of the 8th century, meaning that Grimoald would have been unable to settle them in this area without Byzantine approval, which would be strange as Costans II was in the midst of a disastrous Italian campaign against the Southern Longobards.

It is very probable that Paul the Deacon confused the settlement of Alzeco/Alciocus in the Molise after his flight from Dagobert I with another event about 50 years later, specifically the settlement of one of Kubrat's/Kurt's unnamed sons around Ravenna, most likely as a form of protection against the Longobards for the nominally Byzantine Exarchate. The name of the leader of this group is completely unknown, although the settlement may have been known thanks to Byzantine records in the Exarchate.

== Sources ==
- Dillon, John B. "Bulgars". Medieval Italy: An Encyclopedia, ed. Christopher Kleinhenz. London: Routledge, 2004.
- D'Amico, Vincenzo. I Bulgari trasmigrati in Italia nei secoli VI e VII dell’era volgare e loro speciale diffusione nel Sannio. Campobasso, 1933..
- Paulus Diaconus, Historia Langobardorum, Book IV
- Bòna, Istvàn, (2000) Gli Àvari. Un popolo d'oriente nell'Europa dell'Alto Medioevo - In: L'oro degli Avari. Popolo delle steppe in Europa S. 10
