= Kotrag =

Bulgar khan

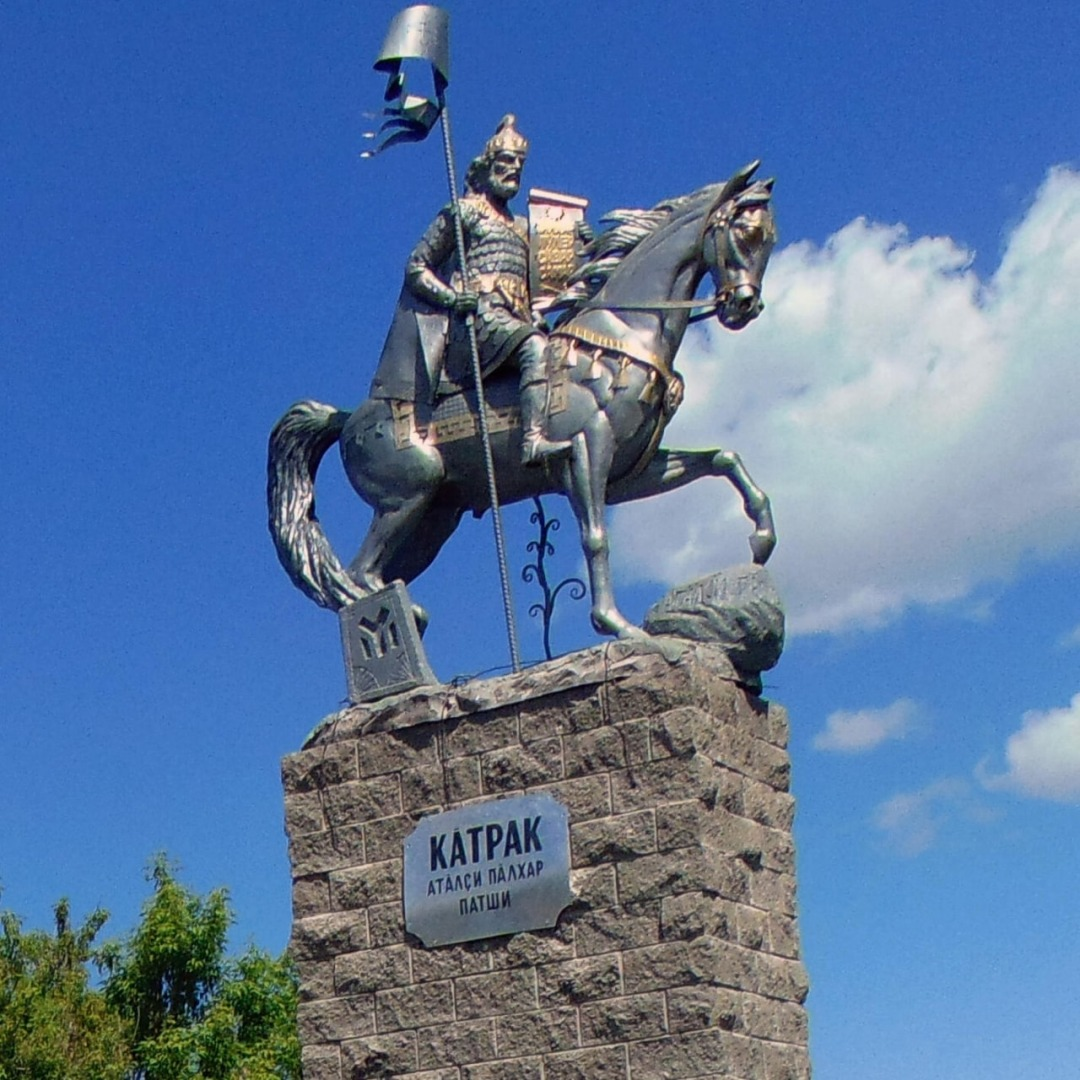
- Monument to Khan Kotrag in the Chuvash Republic, in memory of the founder of the Volga Bulgaria
- Reign: 665 – around 700
- Died: around 700
- House: Dulo
- Father: Kubrat
- Religion: Tengrism

Kotrag was according to Nikephoros I of Constantinople a son of Kubrat of the Dulo clan of Bulgars. Following the death of his father, he began to extend the influence of his Bulgars to the Volga River. He is remembered as the founder of Volga Bulgaria.

== Honour ==
- Kotrag Nunatak on Greenwich Island in the South Shetland Islands, Antarctica is named after Kotrag.
- In the Republic of Chuvashia in the village of Shemursha on June 30th 2022, a monument was erected to the founder of the Volga Bulgaria - Khan Kotrag
- Later, on January 12th 2023, another monument to Khan Kotrag, was installed in Shiryaev on Popova Hill. The monument was made by the famous Bulgarian sculptor Dishko Dishkov. The official opening is scheduled for spring.

== Gallery ==
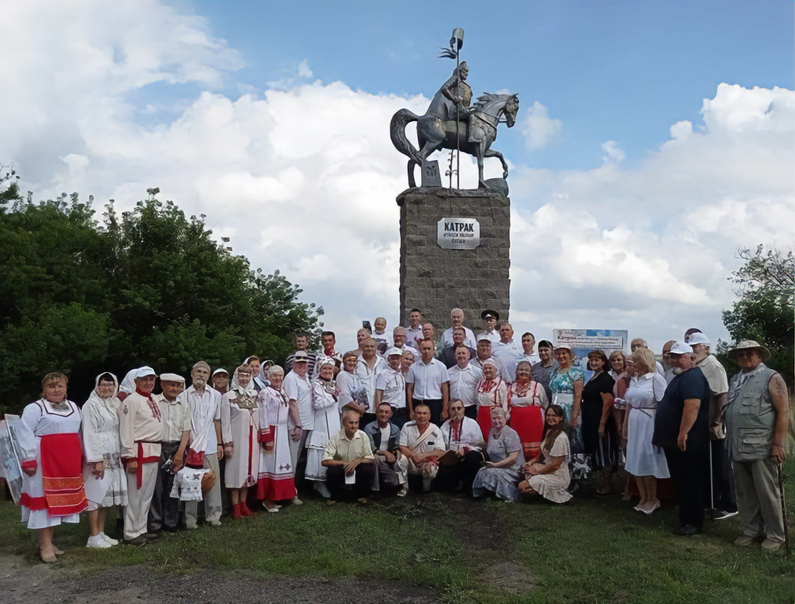
Opening of the monument to Khan Kotrag in the Chuvash Republic, the village of Shemursha, in memory of the founder of the Volga Bulgaria. July, 30. 2022

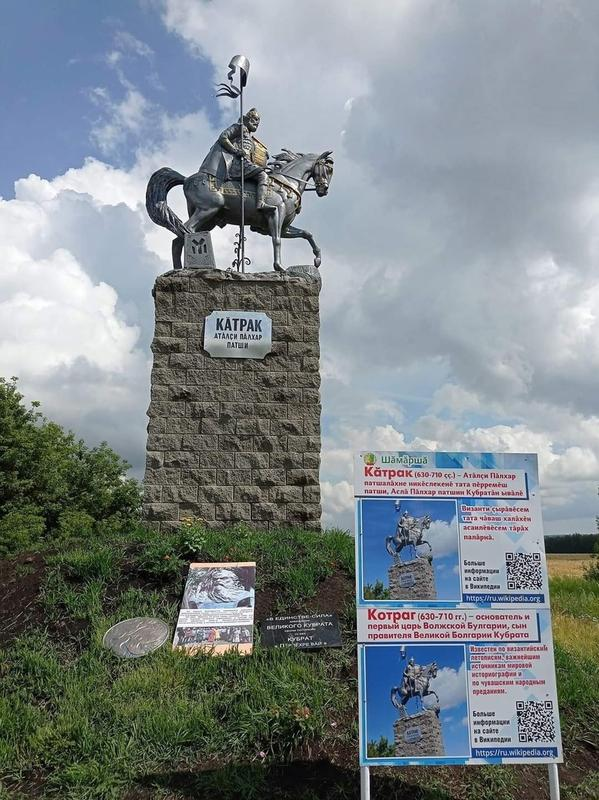
Monument to the founder of the Volga Bulgaria Khan Kotrag in the Chuvash Republic
