= Batbayan =

Bat Bayan
- Ruler of Bulgars
- Reign: 667 to 690 CE
- Predecessor: Kubrat
- Successor: Bu-Timer
- Died: 690 CE
- House: Dulo
- Father: Kubrat

Batbayan ruled the Khazarian Bulgars from 667 to 690 CE. Theophanes and Nicephorus record his rule after the Khazars defeated the Bulgars and Old Great Bulgaria disintegrated in 668 CE.

There is a scholarly theory that he may have been the same person as Bezmer of the Nominalia of the Bulgarian khans who may have been also the first son of Kubrat. He was a member of the Dulo clan, who after Kubrat's death in the mid-7th century ruled Old Great Bulgaria, but his rule lasted only three years. Kevin Alan Brook calls him Bayan. Batbayan would subsequently have ruled the Bulgars as a subject of the Khazar Khagan.
