= Kubrat =

Founding khan of Great Old Bulgaria (r. 632–665)

- Khan
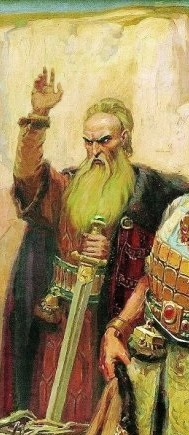
- Imaginary portrait by Dimitar Gyudjenov, 1926
- Reign: c. 632 – c. 650/665?
- Predecessor: Gostun
- Successor: Batbayan
- Born: 606
- Died: 665; Old Great Bulgaria
- Burial: Pereshchepina (now in Ukraine)
- Issue: Batbayan; Kotrag; Asparukh; Kuber; Alcek
- House: Dulo
- Tamga

Kubrat (Greek: Κροβατον, Kούβρατος; Bulgarian: Кубрат [koˈbrat]) was the ruler of the Onogur–Bulgars, credited with establishing the confederation of Old Great Bulgaria in c. 632. His name derived from the Turkic words qobrat – "to gather", or qurt, i.e. "wolf".

== Origin ==
In the Nominalia of the Bulgarian khans Kubrat is mentioned as Kurt (Коуртъ), being a member of the Dulo clan and reigning for 60 years having succeeded Gostun of the Ermi clan.

Bulgars were Turkic nomadic people, who participated in the 5th-century Hunnic confederation. Upon Attila's death, the tribes that later formed the Bulgars had retreated east into the Black Sea-Caspian Steppe. The western Bulgar tribes joined the Avar Khaganate, while the eastern Bulgars came under the Western Turkic Khaganate by the end of the 6th century.

Theophanes the Confessor called him "king of the Onogundur Huns". Patriarch Nikephoros I (758–828) called Kubrat "lord of the Onuğundur" and "ruler of the Onuğundur–Bulğars". John of Nikiu (fl. 696) called him "chief of the Huns". D. Hupchick identified Kubrat as "Onogur", P. Golden as "Oğuro-Bulğar", H. J. Kim as "Bulgar Hunnic/Hunnic Bulgar". According to H. J. Kim the Onogundur/Onogur were evidently part of the Bulgar confederation.

== History ==
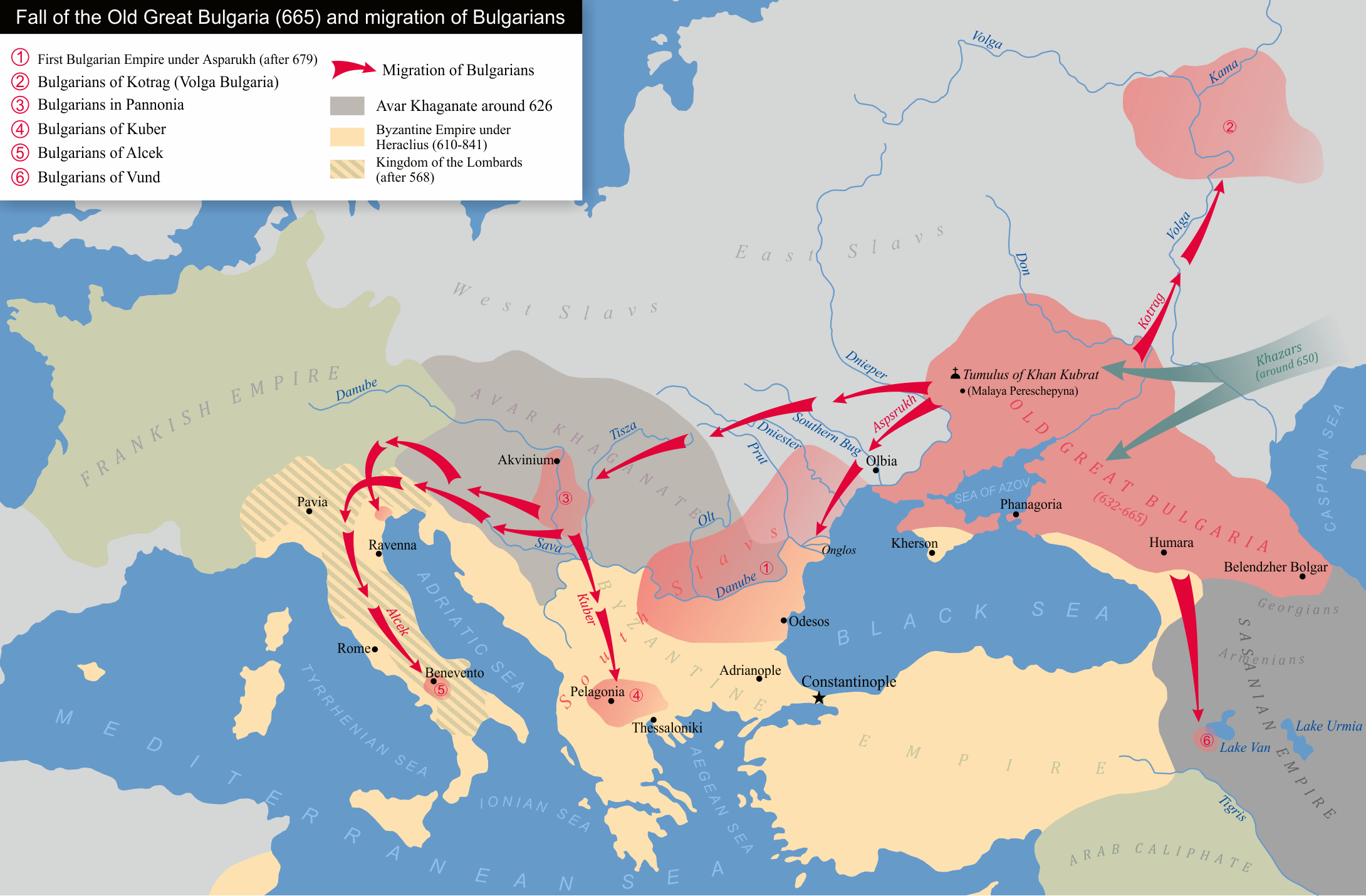
Old Great Bulgaria and migration of Bulgars

Kubrat spent his early life at the Byzantine Empire imperial palace in Constantinople. As the 7th-century Byzantine historian John of Nikiu narrates:

This project is concerned with Kubratos, chief of the Huns [sic], the nephew of Organa, who was baptized in the city of Constantinople, and received into the Christian community in his childhood and had grown up in the imperial palace. And between him and the elder Heraclius great affection and peace had prevailed, and after Heraclius's death he had shown his affection to his sons and his wife Martina because of the kindness [Heraclius] had shown him. And after he had been baptized with life-giving baptism he overcame all the barbarians and heathens through Virtue of holy baptism. Now touching him it is said that he supported the interests of the children of Heraclius and opposed those of Constantine.

Whether he was a child or a young adult during his time in Constantinople is unclear. The exact time of this event is also unknown but probably coincided with the reign of Emperor Heraclius (r. 610–641). His or Organa's conversion to Christianity is placed circa 619 AD. It seems that young Kubrat was part of the pre-planned coalition, initiated by Heraclius or Organa, against the Sasanian–Avar alliance. This coincides with other alliances by Heraclius with steppe peoples, all in the interest of saving Constantinople.

Kubrat, in 635, according to Nikephoros I, "ruler of the Onoğundur–Bulğars, successfully revolted against the Avars and concluded a treaty with Heraclius". The state Old Great Bulgaria (Magna Bulgaria) was formed. Kubrat died "when Konstantinos was in the West", somewhere during the reign of Constans II (641–668).

According to Nikephoros I, Kubrat instructed his five sons (Batbayan, Kotrag, Asparukh, two others unmentioned are considered to be Kuber and Alcek) to "never separate their place of dwelling from one another, so that by being in concordance with one another, their power might thrive". However, the loose tribal union broke up under internal tensions and especially Khazars pressure from the East.

== Kubrat's death ==
The Pereshchepina Treasure was discovered in 1912 by Ukrainian peasants in the vicinity of Poltava, in village Malo Pereshchepyne. It consists of diverse gold and silver objects of total weight of over 50 kg from the migration period, including three rings with monograms, which led scholars to identify the site as Kubrat's grave. The ring A was inscribed in Greek XOBPATOY and ring C was inscribed XOBPATOY ПATPIKIOY, indicating the dignity of Patrikios (Patrician) that he had achieved in the Byzantine world. The treasure indicates close relation between the Bulgars and Byzantines, e.g. the bracelets were influenced or made by a Byzantine goldsmith. The first treasure coins were issued after 629, by Heraclius, and the last c. 650 AD, by Constans II, which can be associated with the upcoming Khazar conquest.

Kubrat is mentioned in the Nominalia of the Bulgarian khans, according which his birth is given the sign of the ox (shegor vechem) in the Bulgar calendar. It also says his rule was 60 years. Presuming lifespan is meant, this would place his death in 653 or 665 AD. Thus, the date of Kubrat's death according historical and archaeological sources is placed between 650 and 665 AD. Correspondingly his birth could have been between 590 and 615 if Somogyi's theory is correct.

== Legacy ==
Kubrat Knoll on Livingston Island in the South Shetland Islands, Antarctica is named after Kubrat of Great Bulgaria.

Kubrat was portrayed by Vasil Mihaylov in the 1981 Bulgarian movie Aszparuh, directed by Ludmil Staikov.

The tamga (signature) of Kubrat is used as part of the logo of the Bulgarian Nationalist Morality, Unity, Honour political party.

== See also ==
- Utigurs
- Kutrigurs

== Annotations ==
1. Also rendered Kubratos, Cubratus, Kuvrat, Qubrat, Qobrat, Xubraat, Xubratoy; possibly derived from Turkic qobrat/quvrat, "to gather". Kurt (Коуртъ) is derived from Turkic qurt, "wolf".
2. Joachim Werner

== Sources ==
- Charles, Robert H. (2007) [1916]. The Chronicle of John, Bishop of Nikiu: Translated from Zotenberg's Ethiopic Text. Merchantville, NJ: Evolution Publishing. ISBN 9781889758879.
- Fiedler, Uwe (2008). "Bulgars in the Lower Danube region: A survey of the archaeological evidence and of the state of current research". In Curta, Florin; Kovalev, Roman (eds.). The Other Europe in the Middle Ages: Avars, Bulgars, Khazars and Cumans. Brill. pp. 151–236. ISBN 9789004163898.
- Golden, Peter B. (2011). Studies on the Peoples and Cultures of the Eurasian Steppes. Editura Academiei Române; Editura Istros a Muzeului Brăilei. ISBN 9789732721520.
- Golden, Peter Benjamin (1992). An introduction to the History of the Turkic peoples: ethnogenesis and state formation in medieval and early modern Eurasia and the Middle East. Wiesbaden: Otto Harrassowitz. ISBN 9783447032742.
- Hupchick, Dennis P. (2017). The Bulgarian-Byzantine Wars for Early Medieval Balkan Hegemony: Silver-Lined Skulls and Blinded Armies. Springer. ISBN 978-3-319-56206-3.
- Kim, Hyun Jin (2013). The Huns, Rome and the Birth of Europe. Cambridge University Press. ISBN 978-1-107-06722-6.
- Somogyi, Péter (2008). "New remarks on the flow of Byzantine coins in Avaria and Walachia during the second half of the seventh century". In Curta, Florin; Kovalev, Roman (eds.). The Other Europe in the Middle Ages: Avars, Bulgars, Khazars and Cumans. Brill. pp. 83–150. ISBN 9789004163898.
- Sophoulis, Panos (2011). Byzantium and Bulgaria, 775-831: Winner of the 2013 John Bell Book Prize. BRILL. ISBN 978-90-04-20696-0.
- Stratos, Andreas Nicolaou (1978). 668-685. Adolf M. Hakkert. ISBN 9789025607487.
- Vachkova, Veselina (2008). "Danube Bulgaria and Khazaria as part of the Byzantine oikoumene". In Curta, Florin; Kovalev, Roman (eds.). The Other Europe in the Middle Ages: Avars, Bulgars, Khazars and Cumans. Brill. pp. 339–362. ISBN 9789004163898.
- Kardaras, Georgios (2018). Byzantium and the Avars 6th-9th Century AD. Brill. pp. 99–100. ISBN 9789004382268.

| Preceded by Organa | Bulgarian Ruler | Succeeded by Batbayan |
