= 599 =

Calendar year

599 in various calendars
- Gregorian calendar: 599; DXCIX
- Ab urbe condita: 1352
- Armenian calendar: 48; ԹՎ ԽԸ
- Assyrian calendar: 5349
- Balinese saka calendar: 520–521
- Bengali calendar: 5–6
- Berber calendar: 1549
- Buddhist calendar: 1143
- Burmese calendar: −39
- Byzantine calendar: 6107–6108
- Chinese calendar: 戊午年 (Earth Horse); 3296 or 3089 — to — 己未年 (Earth Goat); 3297 or 3090
- Coptic calendar: 315–316
- Discordian calendar: 1765
- Ethiopian calendar: 591–592
- Hebrew calendar: 4359–4360
- Hindu calendars
- Vikram Samvat: 655–656
- Shaka Samvat: 520–521
- Kali Yuga: 3699–3700
- Holocene calendar: 10599
- Iranian calendar: 23 BP – 22 BP
- Islamic calendar: 24 BH – 23 BH
- Javanese calendar: 488–489
- Julian calendar: 599; DXCIX
- Korean calendar: 2932
- Minguo calendar: 1313 before ROC 民前1313年
- Nanakshahi calendar: −869
- Seleucid era: 910/911 AG
- Thai solar calendar: 1141–1142
- Tibetan calendar: ས་ཕོ་རྟ་ལོ་ (male Earth-Horse); 725 or 344 or −428 — to — ས་མོ་ལུག་ལོ་ (female Earth-Sheep); 726 or 345 or −427

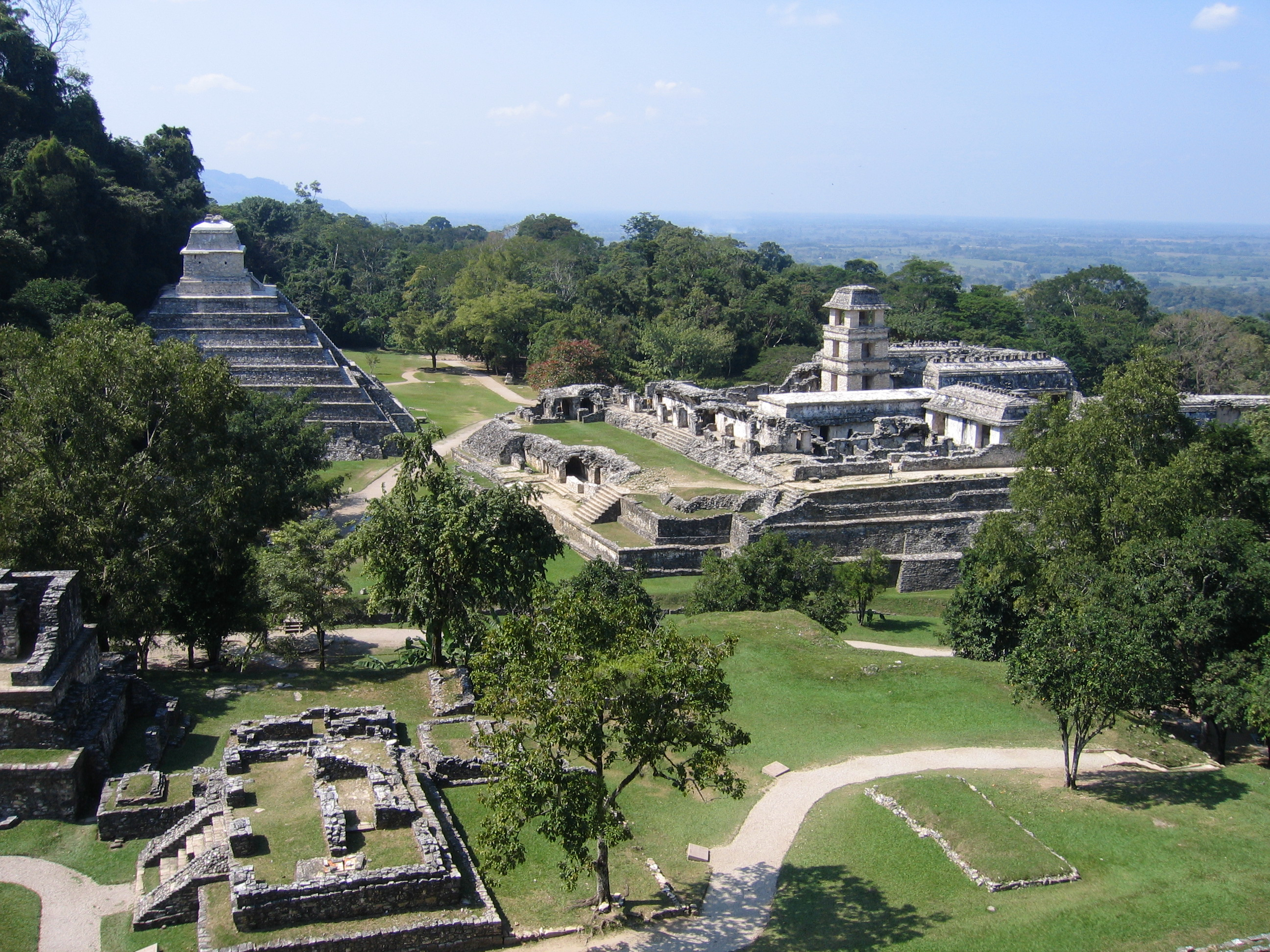
The Maya city of Palenque (modern Mexico)

Year 599 (DXCIX) was a common year starting on Thursday of the Julian calendar. The denomination 599 for this year has been used since the early medieval period, when the Anno Domini calendar era became the prevalent method in Europe for naming years.

== Events ==
=== By place ===
==== Byzantine Empire ====
- Emperor Maurice refuses to pay ransom for 12,000 Byzantine soldiers taken prisoner by the Avars. Their leader Bayan I orders the execution of the prisoners, and slaughters them all. His failure to buy back the captives destroys Maurice's popularity with the Byzantine troops in the Balkan Peninsula.
- Summer – Balkan Campaign: The Byzantine generals Priscus and Comentiolus join their forces at Singidunum (modern Belgrade), and move downstream to the fortress city of Viminacium (Serbia). The Byzantines cross the Danube River and invade Upper Moesia, where they defeat the Avars in open battle.
- Priscus pursues the fleeing Avar tribes and invades their homeland in Pannonia. He devastates the land east of the Tisza River, deciding the war for the Byzantines and ending the Avar and Slavic incursions across the Danube.
- Autumn – Comentiolus reopens the Gate of Trajan pass, near Ihtiman (Bulgaria). This strategic mountain pass, whose fortress "Stipon" defends the border between the provinces Thrace and Macedonia, is not used for decades.

==== Europe ====
- Callinicus, governor (exarch) of Ravenna, repulses attacks of the South Slavs in Istria (Croatia). The region is pillaged, but the Byzantines drive them all out.
- Callinicus breaks the truce by kidnapping the Lombard daughter of King Agilulf, beginning a war with the Exarchate of Ravenna (approximate date).

==== Britain ====
- Rædwald becomes king (bretwalda) of East Anglia (East of England), under the overlordship of Æthelberht of Kent (according to the Anglo-Saxon Chronicle).

==== Persia ====
- King Khosrau II sends a Persian expedition to South Arabia and conquers Yemen. He establishes a military base to control the sea trade with the East (approximate date).

==== Asia ====
- Tardu declares himself to be ruler (khagan) of the united Turkic Khaganate (east and west). His new status is not recognised widely in the empire.
- Beop becomes king of the Korean kingdom of Baekje.

==== Mesoamerica ====
- The Maya city of Palenque (southern Mexico) is plundered by King Scroll Serpent of Calakmul (approximate date).

=== By topic ===
==== Religion ====
- Venantius Fortunatus, Latin poet and hymnodist in the Merovingian court, is appointed bishop of Poitiers.

== Births ==
- January 23 – Tai Zong, emperor of the Tang dynasty (d. 649)

== Deaths ==
- Anastasius I, patriarch of Antioch
- Hye, king of Baekje (Korea)
- Taliesin, Brythonic poet (approximate date)
- Tulan Qaghan, ruler (khagan) of the Göktürks
