= Comentiolus' Avar Campaign (586) =

Campaign during the Avar–Byzantine Wars

- Part of Avar–Byzantine Wars
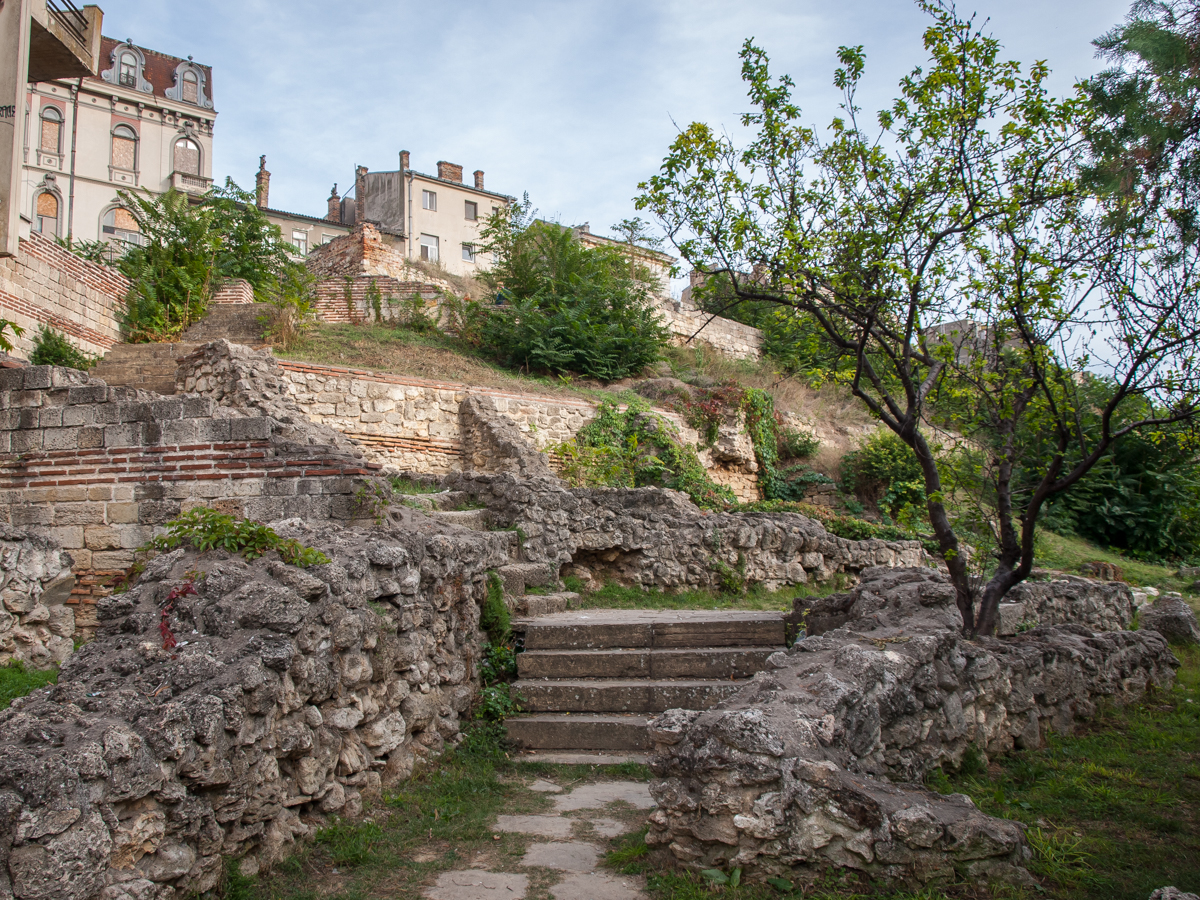
- Ruins of the city of Tomis, modern Constanța
Date	Winter, early 586
Location	Thrace, Dobruja
Result	Byzantine victory (Note: 'The target of the Khagan’s attack proves that all of the Avars had fled towards the north after Comentiolus’s successful attack against the Khagan’s main encampment. It was only when the Avars had reached the Danube area that the Khagan was able to regroup his panicked and scattered forces. This proves that Comentioulus had been far more successful than Theophylact claims. Theophylact was likely using a pro-Priscus source which was hostile towards Comentiolus, who had achieved remarkable successes with very small forces against a numerically superior foe, and it was because of luck that he had not captured the Khagan twice. The Emperor knew of this (Syvänne p.248))

Belligerents
Byzantine Empire	Avar Khaganate

Commanders and leaders
Comentiolus; Castus (POW); Martinus; Ansimuth (POW)	Bayan I (possibly)

Strength
6,000 cavalry (Comentiolus' army); Unknown number of men in Thrace	Greater than the Byzantines

Casualties and losses
Moderate (mostly from Castus' column); 500+ killed in Thrace	Very Heavy; Most of the Khagan's army wiped out at Astike

Comentiolus' Avar Campaign was an offensive conducted by the Byzantine general Comentiolus against the armies of the Avar Khaganate, which had invaded the Byzantine Balkans, in 586. By conducting guerilla fighting and lightning cavalry attacks, the Byzantines inflicted a series of defeats on the Khagan, annihilating much of his forces, and driving him northwards, though these successes did not eliminate the Avars as a threat altogether.

== Background ==
In 585, tensions between the Avar Khaganate and the Byzantine Empire flared following diplomatic breakdown. An Avar shaman named Bookolabra had developed an affair with one of the Khagan's wives, and fearing the repercussions, attempted to flee to the Gokturks. in 584-585, while travelling with 7 companions near the Danube, Bookolabra was caught by a Byzantine patrol, imprisoned, and then dispatched to Constantinople. The shaman was able to convince the Emperor Maurice that the invading Slavs who had ravaged Byzantine territory, before being defeated in 585, had done so at the behest of the Avars. As a response, the Byzantines ceased the tribute they been paying to the Avars since a treaty in 582, and imprisoned their ambassador, Targitius, on the island of Chalcitis for half a year.

With these diplomatic affronts to his prestige, the Khagan initiated an invasion of Byzantine territory. The apparent weakness of Byzantine defences in the Balkans, due to the manpower demands of their ongoing war against Persia, likely encouraged him. According to Theophylact Simocatta, the Avars pillaged Aquis, Bononia, Ratiaria, Dorostolon, and Tropaion, along the Danubian frontier zone, before veering southwards to pillage Zaldapa and Marcianopolis.

== Comentiolus' campaign ==
In 586AD, Commentiolus assembled a cavalry force in the city of Tomis to conduct a winter offensive against the Avars, aiming to strike at the Khagan himself. He had a paper strength of only 10,000 horsemen available, and from these he chose only those fit enough to participate, reducing his actual fighting force to 6,000 men. This army was vastly inferior in numbers to the Avar armies south of the Danube, who were led by the Khagan himself, but Comentiolus exploited the fact that the massive Avar armies were scattered during winter to sustain themselves logistically, aiming to defeat them in detail.

=== Tomis and Zaldapa ===
Commentiolus divided his force into three flying columns, with his subcommanders, Castus and Martinus, leading the other two. These columns, numbering 2,000 men each, were so small that they were able to avoid detection by roving Avar bands and scouts, slipping past them. They advanced up to Tomis, near the Danube, where the Khagan's main encampment was located. Martinus caught the much larger Avar army by surprise on its camp and defeated it, as the Khagan narrowly escaped to an island in a nearby lagoon. At around the same time as the Khagan was defeated, another Avar force had been surprised and defeated near Zaldapa by Castus' detachment.

=== Panysus ===
Theophylact's account leaves out the whereabouts of Comentiolus and his column during the abovementioned events, but historian Michael Whitby suggests that he was performing covering actions to support his two subcommanders. As the Avars began to regroup, the Byzantines initiated a withdrawal and regrouped their forces at Marcianopolis. Comentiolus then dispatched Martinus and Castus with their contingents to reconnoitre the Avar movements around the Panysus river, with Martinus scouting near a wooden bridge and Castus sent to investigate a stone crossing. Martinus' contingent withdrew to join Comentiolus when they observed a larger Avar cavalry force on the point of crossing the stream.

Meanwhile, Castus marched over the crossing when he arrived and annihilated an Avar vanguard which opposed him. Castus then attempted to link with Martinus' column, but camped his force on the opposite side of the stream when he failed to do so. The next day he crossed the wooden bridge Martinus had withdrawn from, but before his contingent could rejoin Comentiolus, the much larger main force of the Avars came upon them, with Castus' horsemen routed and scattered. The Byzantine horsemen attempted to escape by hiding themselves in the valleys and woods, but some were captured by the Avars in this debacle and subjected to torture, in order to reveal their comrades' location. The Avars thus found the remainder and took many of the Byzantines as prisoners, including Castus himself.

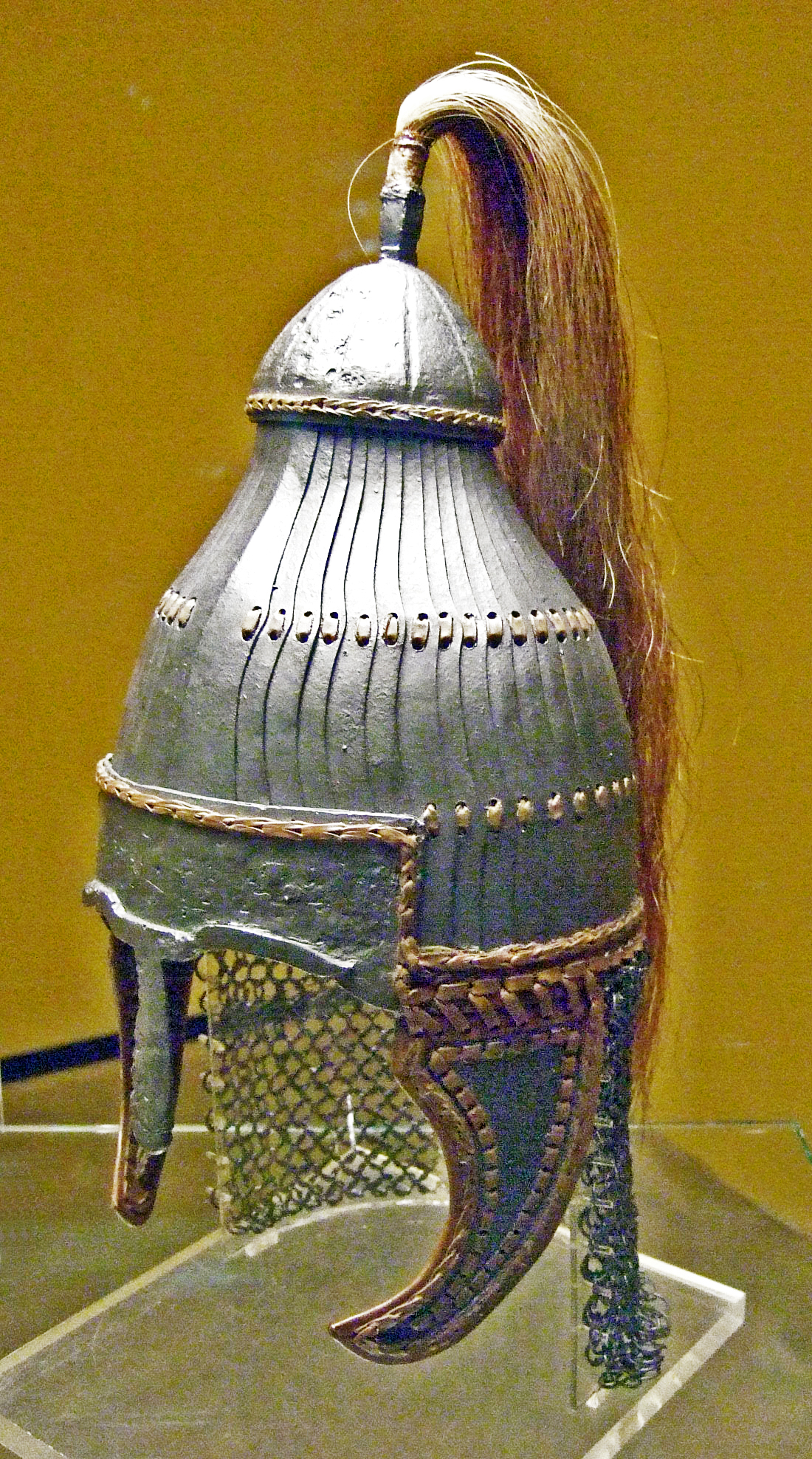
Reconstruction of a lamellar helmet from Niederstotzingen, dated to the late 6th century. This type of helmet would have been in use among the armies of the Avar Khaganate during Comentiolus' campaign, and possibly in more limited capacity by the Byzantine soldiers

=== Astike ===
Having regrouped his forces, the Khagan decided to launch an invasion to the south of Comentiolus' divisions, into Byzantine Thrace, with the aim of devastating Byzantine territory while potentially trying to cut off Comentiolus' route of retreat. By weight of numbers, the Avars overwhelmed and destroyed a 500-man Byzantine garrison holding a strategic pass near Mesembria, and broke through to pillage Thrace. The Khagan next attacked a Byzantine infantry army, led by Ansimuth, as it withdrew from Thrace towards a more defensible position near the capital. The Avar vanguard managed to capture Ansimuth while he was riding to the rear of his army, as he had failed to bring a strong enough rearguard to deter the attackers. However, the fighting retreat of Ansimuth's army appears to have been successful in reaching safety (either the Anastasian Walls or Maurice's ditch), as Theophylact makes no mention of its destruction. Furthermore, the Khagan avoided Maurice's ditch during his 587 invasion of Thrace, indicating this area had likely been reinforced by Ansimuth's men.

Comentiolus, having rejoined with Martinus' division, learned of the location of the Khagan and immediately advanced against the Avar position near Astike, and once again took the latter by surprise and defeated them. Once again, Comentiolus nearly captured the Khagan, but a miscommunication among the Byzantine ranks facilitated his escape. One of the baggage animals of the Byzantine army shed its load and was dragging it about. The owner of a baggage animal was in front of the animal while those behind the animal shouted ‘Turn! Turn!’. As the words ‘Torna! Torna!’ resembled the cavalry command ‘Torna mina!’, and the entire cavalry force made an about turn. This gave time for the Khagan to flee. However, once the Byzantine horsemen realized their blunder, they initiated their assault. The attack was a great success, with most of the Avar army within the encampment destroyed and the remnants fleeing northwards.

== Result ==
This second defeat of the Khagan removed the Avar threat temporarily and allowed Comentiolus to reach the Long Walls safely. However, for the populace, Comentiolus' failure to decisively defeat the Avars with the escapes of the Khagan, and the capture of Castus and Ansimuth during the campaign, (Note: Maurice ransomed Castus later on) resulted in public disapproval of him. This led Maurice to temporarily dismiss Comentiolus, though he was to be reinstated as a commander and conducted several campaigns in later years. It is also noted that the primary source on these events, which is Theophylact Simocatta, tends to portray Comentiolus' (and Peter's) military records negatively in order to extoll the achievements of Priscus, the other Byzantine Balkan commander of the era, leading to emphasis on, and in some cases embellishment of, claimed failures of Comentiolus during the offensive. Although it had not strategically broken the power of the Avar Khaganate, the overall result of the campaign was a Byzantine victory. Comentiolus had achieved remarkable successes and inflicted disproportionate casualties upon the larger enemy forces during the course of the winter campaign.

== Aftermath ==
In 587, the Khagan called in reinforcements from Pannonia to initiate a campaign in retaliation, after his defeats by Comentiolus. Leading his new army into Western Thrace (thereby avoiding Maurice's ditch further East), he initially captured the fortress of Appiaria, and some surrounding forts, with the help of a turncoat Byzantine soldier and engineer named Busas, who helped the Avars in the construction of technologies for siegecraft. The Avars then attacked the cities of Beroea, Diocletianopolis, and Philippopolis, but due to the formidable fortifications and artillery of the Byzantine defenders, they could not capture any one of these. The Khagan then led his army to besiege Adrianople, but before he could capture the city the Avars were forced to fight a Byzantine relief army led by John Mystacon and the ethnically Lombard cavalry commander Droctulfus. The Avars were defeated, forcing the Khagan to abandon the invasion that year.

== Bibliography ==
- Harmatta, János (1995). "Sogdian inscriptions on Avar objects". Acta Orientalia Academiae Scientiarum Hungaricae,Vol. 48, No. 1/2. Cambridge University Press. pp. 61–65.
- Syvänne, Ilkka (2022). The Military History of Late Rome AD 565-602. Pen and Sword. ISBN 978 1 47387 220 2.
- Whitby, Michael; Whitby, Mary (1986). The History of Theophylact Simocatta: An English Translation with Introduction. Oxford University Press.
- Whitby, Michael (1988). The Emperor Maurice and his Historian Theophylact Simocatta on Persian and Balkan Warfare. Clarendon Press. ISBN 978-0198229452.
