= Battles of Viminacium =

Campaign in Avar-Byzantine wars

Battle of Viminacium
- Part of the Avar–Byzantine Wars and Maurice's Balkan campaigns
- Map of the northern Balkans in Late Antiquity
| Date | Summer 599 AD |
| Location | Viminacium, Byzantine Empire (today Kostolac, Serbia) |
| Result | Byzantine victory |

Belligerents
| Byzantine Empire | Avars |

Commanders and leaders
| Priscus | Son of Khagan Bayan † |

Casualties and losses
| At least 300 | ~ 32,000 killed or more |

The Battles of Viminacium were a series of three battles fought against the Avars by the Eastern Roman Empire. They were decisive Roman successes, which were followed by an invasion of Pannonia.

In summer 599, the East Roman Emperor Maurice sent his generals Priscus and Comentiolus to the Danube front against the Avars. The generals joined their forces at Singidunum and advanced together down the river to Viminacium. The Avar khagan Bayan I meanwhile - learning that the Romans had determined to violate the peace - crossed the Danube at Viminacium and invaded Moesia Prima, while he entrusted a large force to four of his sons, who were directed to guard the river and prevent the Romans from crossing over to the left bank. In spite of the presence of the Avar army, however, the Byzantine army crossed on rafts and pitched a camp on the left side, while the two commanders sojourned in the town of Viminacium, which stood on an island in the river. Here Comentiolus is said to have fallen ill or to have mutilated himself so as to be incapable of further action; Thus Priscus assumed command over both armies.

Unwilling at first to leave the city without Comentiolus, Priscus was soon forced to appear in the camp, as the Avars were harassing it in the absence of the generals. A battle was fought which cost the East Romans only three hundred men, while the Avars lost four thousands. This engagement was followed by two other great battles in the next ten days, in which the strategy of Priscus and the tactics of the Roman army were brilliantly successful. In the first, nine thousand of the Avars and their Slav allies fell, while the second was fatal to fifteen thousand, of whom the greater part, and among them the four sons of the khagan, perished in the waters of a lake, into which they were driven by the Roman swords and spears.

Priscus subsequently pursued the fleeing Khagan and invaded the Avar homeland in Pannonia, where he won another series of battles on the banks of the River Tisza. The Avars suffered many casualties and their homeland was pillaged by aggressive Roman soldiers looking to increase their earnings with the lack of pay in the army, due to Maurice's policy on lowering the pay of the troops. Priscus's victories decided the war for the Romans and ending, for a time, the Avar and Slavic incursions across the Danube.

== Sources ==
- Bury, John Bagnell (1889), A History of the Later Roman Empire, from Arcadius to Irene (395 A.D. to 800 A.D.), Volume 2, London: Macmillan and Co., pp. 140–141
- Whitby, Michael; Whitby, Mary (1986). The History of Theophylact Simocatta. Oxford, United Kingdom: Clarendon Press. pp. 194–214. ISBN 978-0-19-822799-1.
