= Maurice's Balkan campaigns =

Battles conducted by the Byzantine Emperor (582 to 602)

Balkan campaigns of Emperor Maurice
- Part of the Roman defence of the Limes Moesiae and the Avar-Byzantine Wars
Date	582–602 AD
Location	Balkan Peninsula, Pannonia, Wallachia
Result	Byzantine victory
Territorial changes	Successful Byzantine defense of their Balkan provinces (Status quo ante bellum)

Belligerents
Byzantine Empire	Avar Khaganate; South Slavs

Commanders and leaders
Emperor Maurice; Comentiolus; Priscus; Peter	Khagan Bayan I, Ardagastus, Musocius, Peiragastus

Maurice's Balkan campaigns were a series of military expeditions conducted by Roman Emperor Maurice (reigned 582–602) in an attempt to defend the Balkan provinces of the Roman Empire from the Avars and the South Slavs. Maurice was the only East Roman emperor, other than Anastasius I, who did his best to implement determined Balkan policies during Late Antiquity by paying adequate attention to the safety of the northern frontier against barbarian incursions. During the second half of his reign, the Balkan campaigns were the main focus of Maurice's foreign policies, as a favourable peace treaty with the Persian Empire in 591 enabled him to shift his experienced troops from the Persian front to the region. The refocusing of Roman efforts soon paid off: the frequent Roman failures before 591 were succeeded by a string of successes afterwards.

Although it is widely believed that his campaigns were only a token measure and that Roman rule over the Balkans collapsed immediately after his overthrow in 602, Maurice was actually well on his way to forestalling the Slavic landfall on the Balkans and nearly preserved the order of Late Antiquity there. His success was undone only over ten years after his overthrow.

Retrospectively, the campaigns were the last in the series of classical Roman campaigns against the Barbarians on the Rhine and Danube, effectively delaying Slavic landfall on the Balkans by two decades. With respect to the Slavs, the campaigns had the typical trait of Roman campaigns against unorganized tribes and of what is now called asymmetric warfare.

== Balkan Peninsula before 582 ==
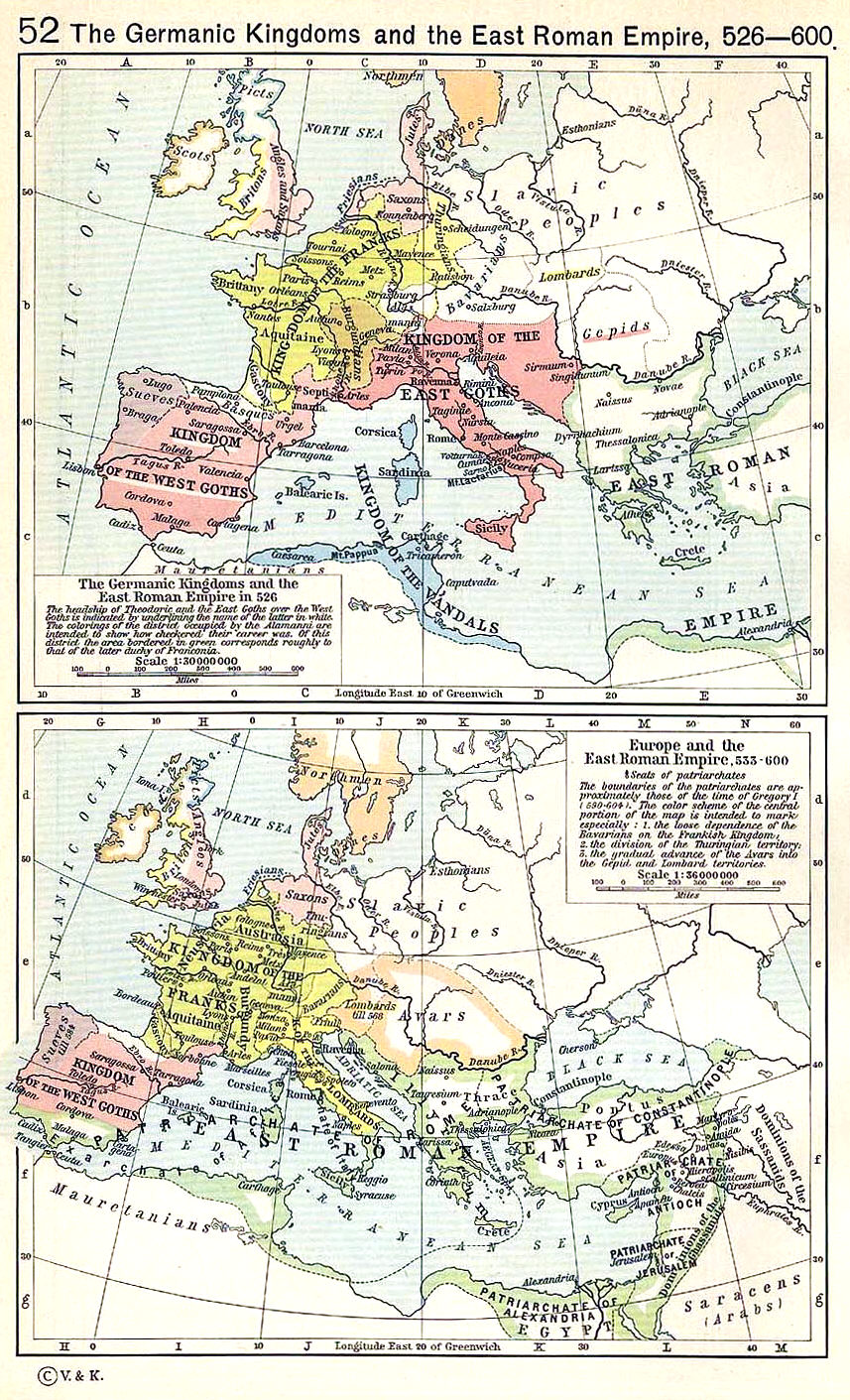
Western Europe and the East Roman Empire 526–600

At Maurice's accession, the greatest omissions of his predecessors were to be found in the Balkans. Justinian I had neglected Balkan defences against the Slavs, who had threatened the frontier since 500 and pillaged the Balkan provinces ever since. Although he rebuilt the fortifications of the Danube Limes, he avoided campaigns against the Slavs, in favour of a policy focusing on the eastern and western theatres. His nephew and successor, Justin II, played off the Avars against the Gepids and later against the Slavs, but that only allowed the Avar Khaganate to become a more powerful threat than the Gepids and Slavs. As Justin II let the Avars attack the Slavs from Roman territory, they soon noted where the most booty was to be had. To make matters worse, Justin II started the Roman-Persian War of 572–591, which tied down forces in the east while they were needed in the Balkans. Maurice's predecessor and father-in-law, Tiberius II Constantine, emptied the treasury. For all those reasons, the Slavic incursions in the Balkans continued.

A few months before Maurice's accession in the winter of 581/2, the Avar Khagan Bayan, aided by Slavic auxiliary troops, took Sirmium, a large fortified settlement south of the Danube. By doing this, Bayan established a new base of operations within Roman territory from where he could raid anywhere in the Balkans unhindered. The Avars were not compelled to leave the territory until the Romans agreed to pay 80,000 solidi annually. The Slavs, partially under Avar rule, were not bound by the treaty and continued to pillage south of the Danube, which made the Avars and Slavs to be quite different threats.

== Avar and Slavic incursions (582 to 591) ==
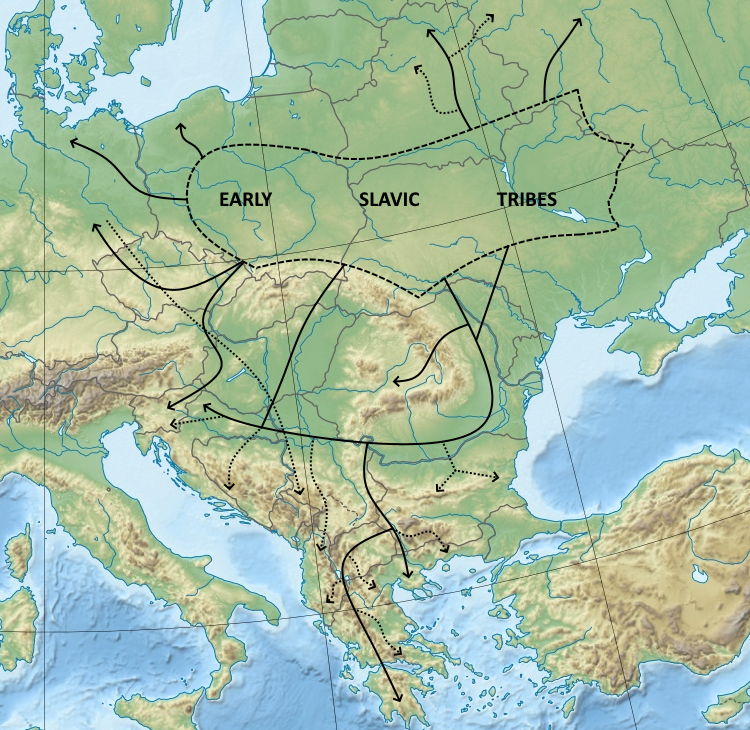
Slavic homeland and migrations in the 6th and 7th century

In 583, the Avars demanded an increase in the tribute to 100,000 solidi. Maurice decided to end all tribute to the Avars, as he concluded that additional concessions would only provoke additional demands. The renewed Avar invasion began in 583 with the capture of Singidunum after stiff resistance. The Avars quickly moved east and captured Viminacium and Augustae, and they began attacking as far southeast as Anchialus after only three months of war. A Roman embassy met the Avars near Anchialus, but negotiations broke down after the Avar Chagan threatened further conquests, provoking an irate response out of Comentiolus, one of the Roman ambassadors. Nevertheless, Maurice established peace in 584 by agreeing to pay the Avars' initial demands of 100,000 solidi. However, the Slavs were unhindered by the treaty and began to raid further south into Greece, as is evidenced by many coin hoards in the region, particularly in Attica near Athens and in the Peloponnese.

As Maurice's forces were tied down in a war against the Persians caused by Justin II, (see Roman-Persian Wars for details), he could muster only a small army against the Avars and Slavs who were marauding in the Balkans. His efforts were hampered by the fact that operations in the Balkans were a completely defensive matter. As opposed to the Persian theatre, the Balkan theatre provided little possibility for a soldier to bolster his pay by pillaging, which made fighting there rather unattractive. Maurice's badly-motivated troops found it difficult to achieve even minor and local success. Rather an exception, a victory won by Comentiolus at Adrianople 584/585 deflected Slavic incursions to southern Greece. The evident destruction of vast parts of old Athens probably happened around then.

Later on, the Balkans deteriorated in such a manner that in 585, the Persian shah, Hormizd IV, could reasonably hope to negotiate a peace treaty that would leave Armenia to the Persians. Maurice rejected the offer and was able to negotiate much more favorable peace terms in 591, after substantial successes on the battlefield. For the time being, however, he had to abide by Avar and Slavic incursions and hope that his forces garrisoned at Singidunum could deter the invaders, who posed a constant threat to the Avar homeland, just on the other side of the Danube. The Roman presence at Singidunum was strong enough to effect constant ends of Avar raids. However, it could not prevent the attacks.

Despite the Roman garrison at Singidunum, the Avars destroyed the fortified towns of Ratiaria and Oescus, on the Danube, and besieged Thessaloniki in 586, which were accompanied by Slavic raids down to the Peloponnese. Under the leadership of Comentiolus, the outnumbered Roman Army avoided any direct confrontation and restricted itself to disturbing the Avar raids by skirmishes and night attacks, a tactical expedient that was advised by Maurice's Strategikon. In 586 and 587, Comentiolus won several victories against the Slavs on the Lower Danube and nearly caught the Avar Khagan Bayan twice. At Tomis, on the shores of the Black Sea, the Khagan escaped via the lagoon-shaped coast, but an ambush on the south slope of the Balkan Mountains was thwarted by miscommunication among the Roman troops:

"a beast of burden had shucked off his load. It happened as his master was marching in front of him. But the ones who were coming from behind and saw the animal dragging his burden after him, had shouted to the master to turn around and straighten the burden. Well, this event was the reason for a great agitation in the army, and started a flight to the rear, because the shout was known to the crowd: the same words were also a signal, and it seemed to mean "run", as if the enemies had appeared nearby more rapidly than could be imagined. There was a great turmoil in the host, and a lot of noise; all were shouting loudly and goading each other to turn back, calling with great unrest in the language of the country "torna, torna, fratre", as if a battle had suddenly started in the middle of the night."

The following year, Priscus took over command from Comentiolus. His first campaign in Thrace and Moesia turned out to be a fiasco, even encouraging the Avars to advance as far as the Marmara Sea. As the state of the Avar bridges across the Sava river near Sirmium deteriorated, however, Avar pressure decreased.

Even so, Maurice did all he could to reinforce his troops on Balkans, as Slavic pillaging continued. He hoped to acquire more money by cutting the soldiers' payment by a quarter. Announcing the plans led to a mutiny on the Persian front in 588, which forced Maurice to abandon the idea. As a consequence, in the Balkans Maurice had only limited means to keep the Avars and Slavs at bay for the next three years.

== Campaigns in 591 to 595 ==
Northern Balkans in the 6th century.

In the late summer of 591, Maurice finally made peace with Persian Shah Khosrow II, who ceded most part of Armenia to the Roman Empire. Finally, the veterans of the Persian wars were at his disposal and so was the recruiting potential of Armenia. Decreasing Avar and Persian pressure enabled the Romans to focus on the Slavs in 590/591. Maurice had already visited Anchialos and other cities in Thrace personally in 590 to oversee their reconstruction and to boost the morale of his troops and the local population. After making peace with Persia, he sped up that development by redeploying troops to the Balkans.

In 592, his troops retrieved Singidunum, but it was to be lost to the Avars again. Smaller Roman units were involved in policing actions against Slavic raiders in Moesia, re-establishing lines of communication between the Roman cities. Maurice aimed to re-establish a sturdy defense line along the Danube River, as Anastasius I had done a century earlier. Furthermore, he intended to keep the Avars and Slavs off Balkan territory by invading their homeland beyond Danube, to enable Roman troops to increase their earnings other than regular pay, by pillaging in hostile territory, which would make such campaigns more attractive.

General Priscus began to hinder the Slavs crossing the Danube in the spring of 593. He routed them several times before he crossed the Danube to carry on the fight in the uncharted swamps and forests of modern-day Muntenia, Romania until autumn. Then, he disobeyed Maurice's order to spend the winter on the northern Danube bank, among the frozen swamps and rivers and the leafless forests. Instead, Priscus retired to winter quarters in Odessos (modern Varna). That led to a new Slavic incursion 593/594 in Moesia and Macedonia, during which the towns of Aquis, Scupi and Zaldapa in Dobruja were destroyed.

In 594, Maurice disposed of Priscus and replaced him by his own rather inexperienced brother Peter. Despite initially failing, Peter maintained his position, defeated the Slavs (Priscus speaks about Bulgars) at Marcianopolis and patrolled the Danube between Novae (modern Svishtov) and the Black Sea. In late August, he crossed the Danube near Securisca west of Novae and fought his way to the Helibacia River, effectively disturbing Slav preparations for new pillaging campaigns.

That success enabled Priscus, who had meanwhile been entrusted with the command of another army upstream to prevent an Avar siege of Singidunum in 595 in a combined action with the Roman Danube fleet. The fact that the Avars retreated and gave up their plans to destroy the city and deport its inhabitants, as opposed to their conquest of 584, showed their lack of confidence and the threat they saw in the border fortress.

Subsequently, the Avars turned off to Dalmatia, where they sacked several fortresses, avoiding direct confrontation with Priscus. Roman commanders were never unduly concerned about barbarian incursions into that remote and impoverished province and so Priscus had to act cautiously. He could not afford to neglect the defence of the Danube and so he dispatched a small force to check the Avar advance. The small force hampered the Avar advance and even retrieved part of the booty.

== Quiet interlude (596–597) ==
After that only moderately successful Avar raid into Dalmatia, there were only minor actions in the Balkans for about one-and-a-half years. Discouraged by the lack of success, the Avars saw more prospect for booty in the West and so raided the Franks in 596. Meanwhile, the Romans used Marcianopolis, near Odessos, as a base of operations on the lower Danube against the Slavs and failed to exploit the Avar absence. No major Slavic raids took place meanwhile.

== Renewed campaigns (597–602) ==
Strengthened by Frankish pay-offs, the Avars resumed their Danubian campaigns in autumn 597, which surprised the Romans. The Avars even managed to besiege Priscus' army in Tomis. On 30 March 598, however, they lifted the siege, as Comentiolus had led an army of rather inexperienced soldiers over the Haemimons and was moving along the Danube up to Zikidiba, near modern-day Medgidia, just 30 kilometres (19 mi) from Tomis. For reasons that remain unknown, Priscus did not pursue the Avars and aid Comentiolus. The latter was forced to retire to Iatrus, where his troops were nonetheless routed and had to fight their way south over the Haemus Range. The Avars used the victory to advance to Drizipera, near Arkadiopolis, between Adrianople and Constantinople, where a large part of their army and seven sons of the Avar Khagan were killed by the plague.

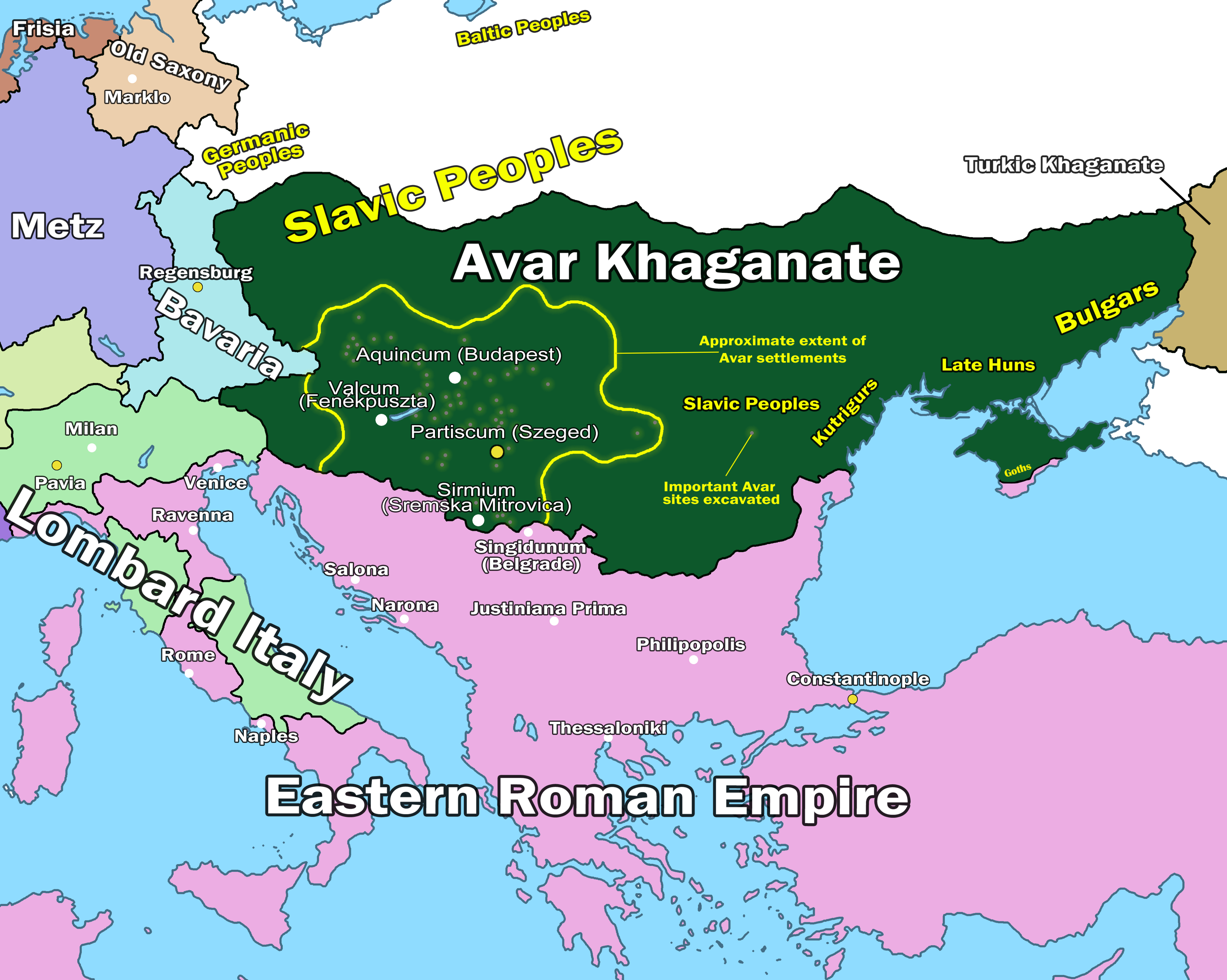
The Avar Khaganate and its neighbors c. 602

Comentiolus was temporarily relieved of his command and replaced by Philippicus, and Maurice summoned the Circus factions and his own bodyguards to defend the long walls west of Constantinople. For the time being, Maurice had managed to buy off the Avars, and in the same year, a peace treaty was concluded with Bayan, the Avar Khagan, explicitly allowing Roman expeditions in Wallachia. The Romans used the remainder of the year to reorganize their forces and analyze the causes of failure.

Then, the Romans violated the treaty: Priscus advanced in the area surrounding Singidunum and wintered there in 598/599. In 599, the armies of Priscus and Comentiolus moved downstream to nearby Viminacium and crossed the Danube. On the north bank, they defeated the Avars in open battle in their own homeland. That was not only the first Avar defeat in their own homeland, but also saw the death of several more sons of Bayan Khagan. Priscus then thrust north into the Pannonian plain, the Avar homeland. He defeated the Avars deep within their realm, but Comentiolus remained near the Danube. Afterwards, Priscus devastated vast tracts of the land east of the Tisza, much in the same way the Avars and Slavs had done in the Balkans. Several Avar tribes and their Gepid subjects suffered particularly high casualties. Two other battles on the banks of the Tisza meant further Avar defeats.

Furthermore, the Exarch of Ravenna Callinicus repulsed Slav attacks on Istria in 599.

In autumn 599, Comentiolus reopened the Gate of Trajan pass, near modern-day Ihtiman. The mountain pass had not been used by the Romans for decades. In 601 Peter advanced to the Tisza and kept the Avars away from the Danube cataracts, the latter being vital for the Roman Danube fleet to maintain access to the cities of Sirmium and Singidunum. In 602, Peter inflicted another severe defeat on the Slavs in Wallachia, and the Avar Khaganate was opposed by the Antes and was on the brink of collapse because of the mutiny of several Avar tribes. One of the rebellious tribes even defected to the Roman side. For the time, the Romans had successfully re-established the Danube line, and forward defense in the hostile territories of Wallachia and Pannonia was waged with success. However, when Maurice ordered the army to spend the winter of 602/603 on the northern bank of the Danube to further his success and to save money on quarters, his troops mutinied, as they had done in 593. While Priscus then had used his own judgment and initiative, Peter did not dare disobey the emperor's orders. He, therefore, soon lost control of his army, which marched straight to Constantinople. That led to the overthrow and death of Maurice, the first successful coup d'état in Constantinople.

== Balkan Peninsula after 602 ==
Maurice had pacified the Balkan borders, a feat not achieved since the reign of Anastasius I. The Avars and Slavs had been kept sternly at bay. The provinces were at a stage of potential recovery; reconstruction and resettlement were the keys to restoring Roman rule firmly. Maurice had planned to settle Armenian militia peasants within the depopulated areas and to Romanize the Slavic settlers in the area. After his ouster, those plans went astray as well as the campaigns and the possible destruction or submission of the Avar realm. The new Roman emperor, Phocas (602–610), would have to fight against the Persians once more: the eastern enemy occupied Armenia in the first phase of the new war. Therefore, Phocas could neither continue the campaigns on the same scale as before nor settle any Armenians in Balkans. That finally led to the decline of classical Roman rule in the Balkan interior, marking the end of Late Antiquity in that region.

=== Phocas' unknown Balkan campaigns (602–612/615) ===
The view that Roman control of Balkans collapsed immediately after his accession is not supported by the evidence.

Phocas indeed continued Maurice's campaigns (albeit with likely much less rigour and discipline) and probably transferred forces to the Persian front after 605. However, even after 605, it is unlikely that he withdrew all forces from the Balkans because of his Thracian heritage. There is no archaeological evidence such as coin hoards or destruction of communities implying Slav or Avar incursions, let alone a total collapse of Roman power during Phocas' reign. On the contrary, there is evidence that refugees from Dardania, Dacia and Pannonia sought protection in Thessalonica only under his successor, Heraclius (610–641). Even a moderate recovery under Phocas may have taken place. Evidently, many fortresses were rebuilt either under Maurice or Phocas. However, even so, it was Phocas' inaction, more or less imposed by the deteriorating situation on the Persian front, that paved the way for the massive invasions of Heraclius' first decade as well as the eventual collapse of Roman rule over the Balkans until the campaigns of the Macedonian Emperors in the late 10th century.

=== Slav and Avar raid (612–626) ===
It is likely that Heraclius withdrew all Roman forces from the Balkans, so as to deal with ongoing Persian invasion. The civil war against Phocas led to a deterioration of the Persian front unequalled by anything before. That, as well as their successful campaigns against the Lombards in Friuli in 610 and against the Franks in 611, probably encouraged the Avars and their Slav subjects to renew their incursions some time after 612. Fortunately to them, Persian capture of Jerusalem in 614 was the key event that Roman counterattack was unlikely. To support this view, the chronicles written in the 610s again record wholesale pillaging. Cities like Justiniana Prima and Salona succumbed to such attacks. It is unknown when a certain area was subdued by Slavic tribes but some events clearly stand out: the destruction of Novae after 613, the conquest of Naissus and Serdica and the destruction of Justiniana Prima in 615; three sieges of Thessalonica (c.604, 615 and 617); the battle of Heraclea Perinthus, on the shores of the Marmara Sea in 619; Slavic raids on Crete in 623 and the siege of Constantinople in 626. From 620 onward, archaeological evidence also provides evidence of Slav settlements within the destroyed Balkan regions.

=== Slow decline of the Balkans after 626 ===
Some cities survived the Avar and Slav incursions and were able to maintain communications with Constantinople via the sea and rivers. Chronicles mention a Roman commander of Singidunum in the middle of Heraclius' reign. Many Danube tributaries accessible by ship, Roman settlements survived like modern-day Veliko Tarnovo on the Yantra River, which even has a church built in the 7th century. Heraclius made use of the short time between the end of the last war against Persia in 628 and the outbreak of Arab attacks in 634, in order to try to re-establish at least some sort of Roman authority over the Balkans. Clear evidence for that is the construction of the fortress of Nicopolis in 629. Heraclius also allowed the Serbs to settle in the Balkans as foederati against the Avars and the Croats in Dalmatia and Lower Pannonia; the Croats even pushed the frontier to the Sava in 630. Having to fight off the Arabs in the east, however, he could not finish his project. Roman rule in rural areas of the Balkans was limited to the successes attained in short summer campaigns. The cities of the Balkans, traditionally the major centres of Roman civilization, had degenerated from the populous, wealthy and self-sufficient polis of Antiquity to a limited, fortified kastron. They were unable to form a cultural and economic nucleus upon which the Roman state could build. Their population was then assimilated by the Slavic settlers. Even so, some cities along the Danube retained their Romanness until the Proto-Bulgarian invasion of 679, also being under Byzantine rule until then. The fact that the Proto-Bulgarians used a debased form of Greek as their administrative language shows that Roman population and administrative structures existed there even after 679.

In short, the decline of Roman power on the Balkans was a slow affair that took place only because of the lack of Byzantine military presence. Being short on troops in the Balkans, Byzantium could not have provided for safe communication among cities. Byzantium could locally impose a rule over the Balkan Slavs only on a short-term basis, not enough to assimilate them. Byzantium, however, used any opportunity given by pauses of activity on the Arab front to subjugate the Slavs and resettle them en masse to Asia Minor.

== Legacy ==
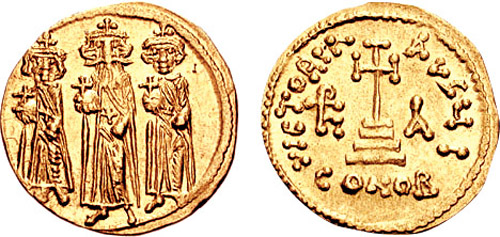
A solidus, depicting Heraclius along his sons Constantine III and Heraklonas

In the end, the successes of Maurice's campaigns were forgone by Phocas. Maurice's hopes for rebuilding the Balkans and resettling Armenian militia peasants in the depopulated areas were not realised. Heraclius could do even less for the Balkans as he was preoccupied with the Eastern front. Therefore, the only immediate consequence was the delay in Slavic landfall on the Balkans. For that reason, it is often assumed that Maurice's Balkan campaigns were a failure.

Probably, Avar defeats in the late part of the campaigns from 599 onward had a long-term impact. The Avars had been bloodily defeated in their own country and had proved to be unable to protect themselves, let alone their subjects. Until the battle of Viminacium in 599, they had been seen as invincible, allowing them to thoroughly exploit their subjects. Once Avar renown had fallen, the first rebellions occurred, to be crushed after 603. The Avars were able to score further successes against the Lombards, Franks and Romans; however, they were unable to restore their former reputation. That can explain the Slavic uprising under the leadership of Samo in 623, three years before the abortive Siege of Constantinople.

Maurice's campaigns put an end to Avar dreams of hegemony over the Balkans and paved the way for an end of the Avar threat. The Khagan's power collapsed only after the unsuccessful Siege of Constantinople in 626, and the Avar Khaganate would be finally destroyed much later, by Charlemagne in (791–803). The Avar Khaganate Empire ceased to exist after 790. The Muslim conquests from the 630s onward led to the loss of all of Rome's long-held eastern provinces as far as the Taurus Mountains. The constant Arab threat over strategically important Asia Minor had a great impact on the Balkans. Several decades were to pass before Constantinople could regain the initiative and reconquer parts of the Slav-controlled areas (Sklavinia). Several centuries were to pass before Basil II restored all of the Balkans to Byzantine control.

== See also ==
- Asia Minor Slavs
- Avar-Byzantine wars

== Sources ==
=== Primary sources ===
- Maurice's Strategikon: Handbook of Byzantine Military Strategy. translated by George T. Dennis. Philadelphia 1984, Reprint 2001.
- Theophylact Simocatta, Historiae

=== Secondary sources ===
- Curta, Florin (2001). The Making of the Slavs: History and Archaeology of the Lower Danube Region, c. 500–700. Cambridge: Cambridge University Press. ISBN 9781139428880.
- Curta, Florin (2006). Southeastern Europe in the Middle Ages, 500–1250. Cambridge: Cambridge University Press. ISBN 978-0-521-81539-0.
- Fischer Weltgeschichte, Band 13, "Byzanz" (pp. 139ff.). Franz Georg Maier, Frankfurt a. M. (1973) (in German)
- Norwich, John Julius (1998). A Short History of Byzantium.
- Whitby, Michael (1998). The Emperor Maurice and his Historian – Theophylact Simocatta on Persian and Balkan Warfare. Oxford University Press. ISBN 0-19-822945-3.
- Pohl, Walter (2002). Die Awaren (in German). München.
