= Comentiolus =

Byzantine general

- Military career
- Allegiance: Eastern Roman Empire
- Rank: magister militum praesentalis
- Conflicts: Avar–Byzantine wars; Comentiolus' Avar Campaign (586); Maurice's Balkan campaigns; Byzantine–Sasanian War of 572–591

Comentiolus (Greek: Κομεντίολος, Komentiolos; died 602) was a prominent Eastern Roman general at the end of the 6th century, during the reign of Emperor Maurice. He played a major role in the Avar-Byzantine wars, and also fought in the East against the Sasanian Empire. Comentiolus was executed in 602, after the Byzantine army rebelled against Maurice and Phocas usurped the throne.

== Biography ==
=== Origins and war against the Avars and Slavs ===
Map of the northern Haemus during the 6th century.

Nothing is known of Comentiolus's early life, except that he hailed from Thrace. He first appears in 583, as an scribon in the Excubitores, the imperial bodyguard, when he accompanied a Byzantine embassy to Bayan I, the Khagan of the Avars. According to the historian Theophylact Simocatta, he enraged the khagan with an outspoken statement and was briefly imprisoned.

It is likely that the close trust he shared with Maurice dates from the latter's time as commander of the Excubitores, before his ascension to the throne. Throughout his career, Comentiolus would be loyal to Maurice, and the Emperor would watch over his protégé's career. The following year, after a truce with the Avars had been arranged, he was appointed in charge of a regiment (taxiarchia) operating against the Slavic tribes that were raiding Thrace and had penetrated as far as the Long Walls of Anastasius, Constantinople's outer defensive system. Comentiolus defeated them at the river Erginia, near the Long Walls. As a reward for this success, he was appointed Magister Militum Praesentalis in 585.

On this occasion, or perhaps a bit later (possibly in 589), Comentiolus was raised to the supreme title of Patrikios. In the summer of 585, he defeated again a large force of Slavs, and in 586 he was placed in charge of the war against the Avars, after they broke the treaty. Comentiolus assembled a 10,000 strong army at Anchialus and led 6,000 of them in a series of successful attacks, where he annihilated the Avar army at Astike and almost captured the Khagan himself.

=== Deployment in Spain and war against the Persians ===
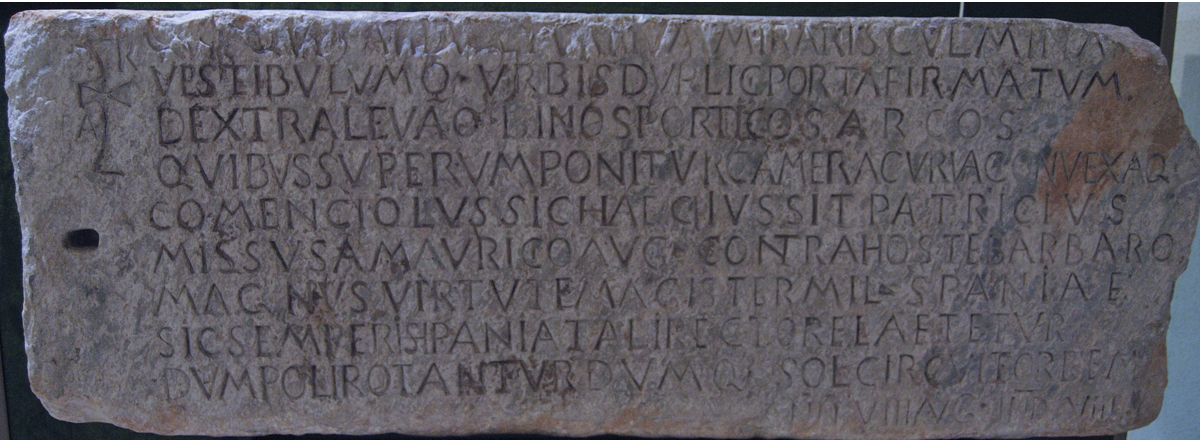
The "Inscription of Comenciolus", from Carthago Nova (Cartagena)

Map of the Roman-Persian frontier.

By 589, Comentiolus appears to have served as magister militum in the province of Spania, as an inscription bearing his name has been found in Carthago Nova, but it may have been erected by a namesake. At any rate, by the autumn of 589 he was back in the East, replacing Philippicus in command of the eastern army in the ongoing war against the Sasanian Empire. His army defeated the Persians at the Battle of Sisauranon in the same year, and unsuccessfully tried to recapture Martyropolis. In the spring of 590, while at his headquarters at Hierapolis, he received an unexpected guest: the legitimate Sasanian Shah Khosrow II, who had fled to Byzantine territory to seek support against the usurper Bahram Chobin. Emperor Maurice decided to support the exiled monarch, and assembled an army to restore Khosrow to his throne. Comentiolus was initially slated to lead this force, but after Khosrow complained of Comentiolus being disrespectful towards him, he was replaced as commander of the expedition by Narses. Comentiolus still took part in the subsequent campaign as commander of the army's right flank. The restored Persian king repaid Roman assistance with a treaty which put an end to the war that had lasted almost 20 years, and ceded back all cities lost in Mesopotamia, as well as most of Armenia, to the Romans.

=== Redeployment against the Avars and execution ===
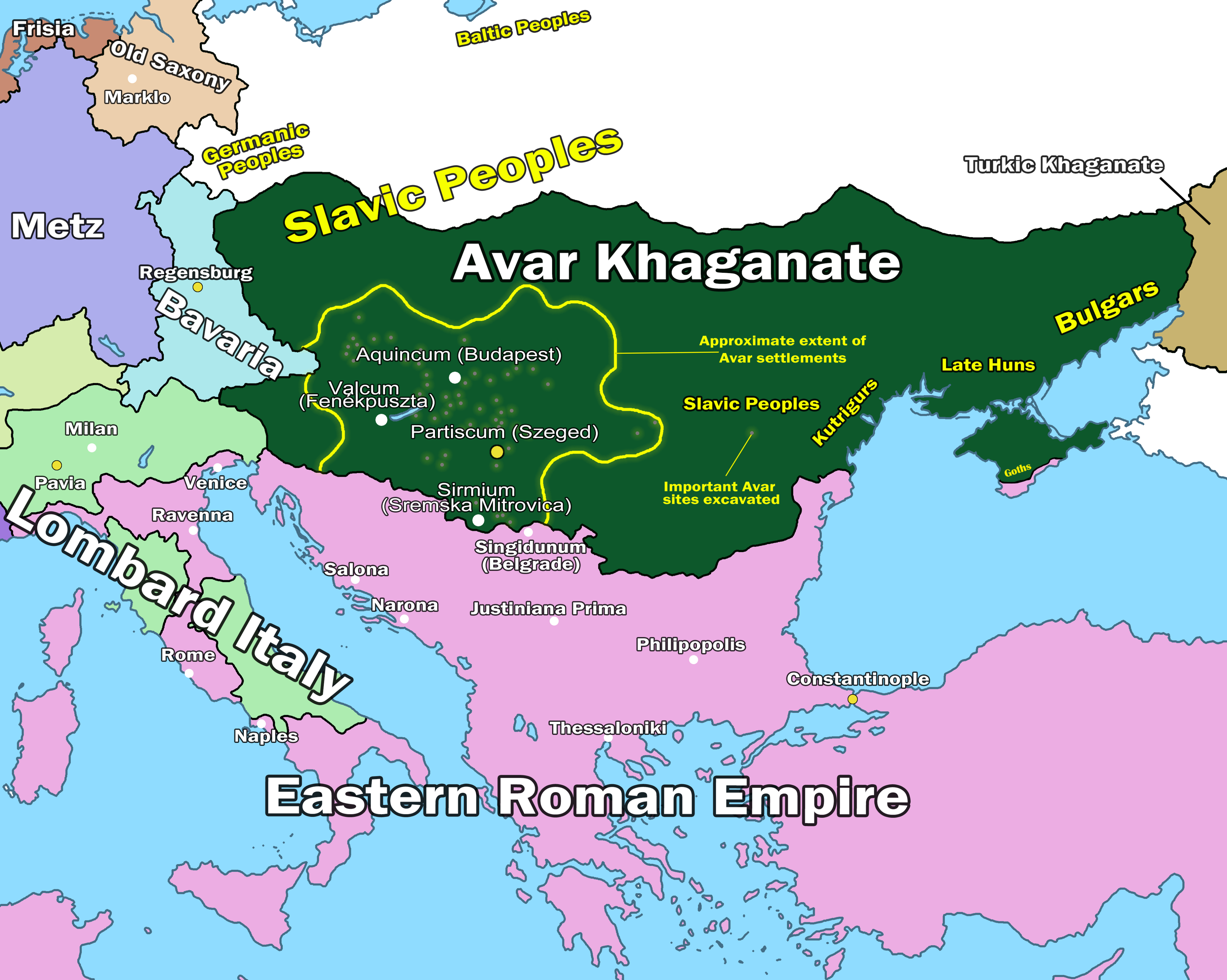
The Avar Khaganate in 602

This favourable peace meant that Byzantium's forces could be concentrated against the Avar and Slav incursions in the Balkans. In 598, Comentiolus was sent back into action against the Avars, possibly in the position of Magister Militum per Thracias. After a heavy defeat caused by his neglect to properly array his forces for battle, his army was scattered and he himself fled to Constantinople, where he faced charges of treason. These were dropped at the Emperor's request, and Comentiolus was reconfirmed as Magister Militum. His subsequent record is not very distinguished, but according to Michael Whitby this may be more due to the negative bias of Simocatta, the main primary source for the period, towards him and his co-general Peter, rather than inability or inaction on his part. At any rate, when the army rebelled against Maurice in 602, Comentiolus was entrusted with the defence of the Walls of Constantinople. When Phocas eventually took the city, he was one of the first adherents of the old regime to be executed.

== Sources ==
- Syvänne, Ilkka (2022). The Military History of Late Rome AD 565-602. Pen and Sword. ISBN 978 1 47387 220 2.
- Martindale, John R., ed. (1992). The Prosopography of the Later Roman Empire: Volume III, AD 527–641. Cambridge: Cambridge University Press. ISBN 0-521-20160-8.
- Whitby, Michael; Whitby, Mary (1986). The History of Theophylact Simocatta: An English Translation with Introduction. Oxford University Press.
- Whitby, Michael (1988). The Emperor Maurice and his Historian – Theophylact Simocatta on Persian and Balkan Warfare. Oxford, United Kingdom: Oxford University Press. ISBN 0-19-822945-3.
- The History of Theophylact Simocatta: An English Translation with Introduction. Translated by Whitby, Michael; Whitby, Mary. Oxford University Press. 1986.
