= Diocletianopolis (Thrace) =

Ancient Roman town in Hisarya, Bulgaria

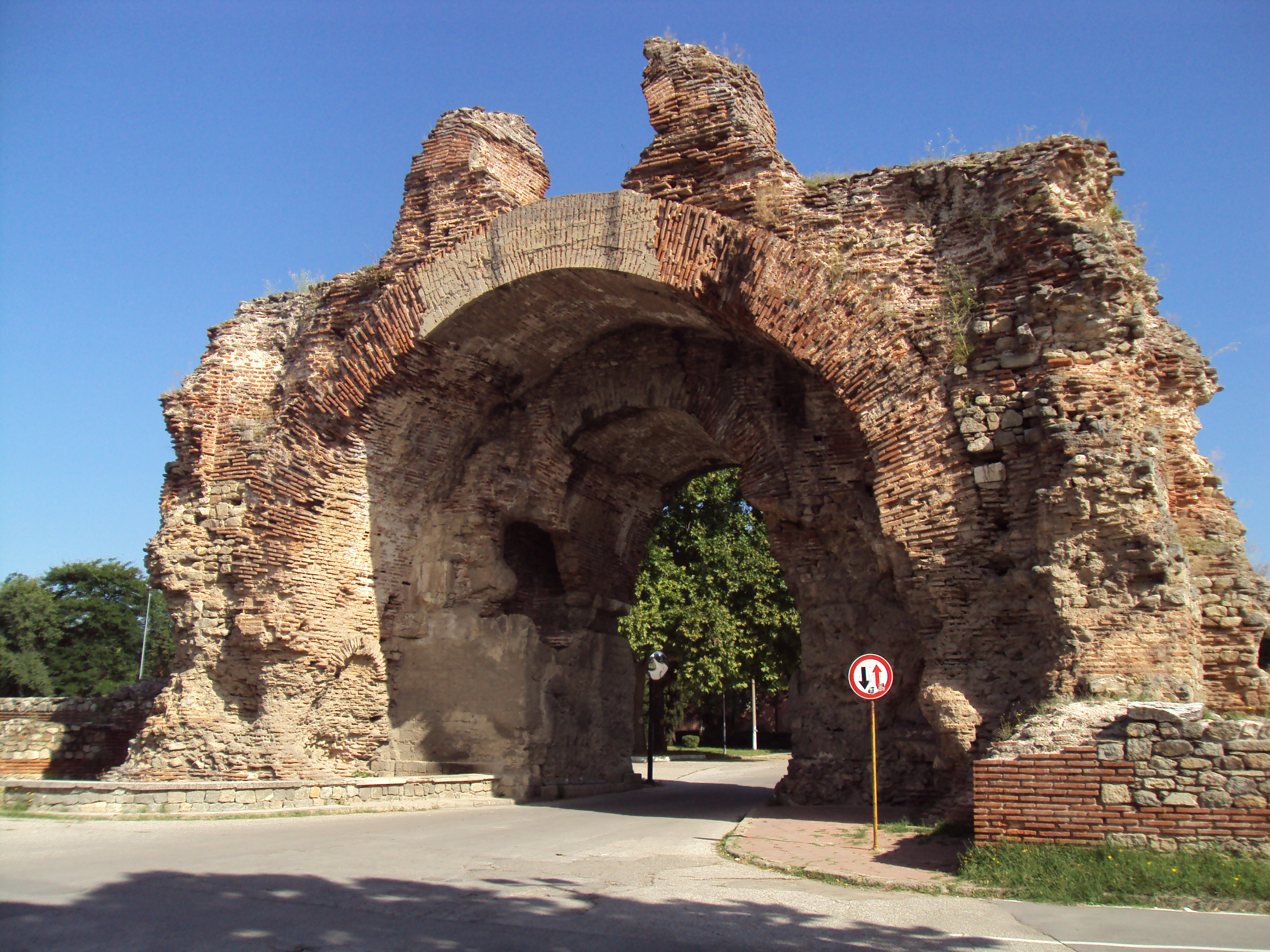
The southern gate of Diocletianopolis

Diocletianopolis (Greek: Διοκλητιανούπολις, Bulgarian: Диоклецианопол, "Town of Diocletian") was an ancient Roman town in the region of Thrace, nowadays the town of Hisarya in Bulgaria.

Its impressive remains include the enormous defensive walls which still stand close to their original height for the majority of their circuit.

There is an on-site museum for the many objects discovered.

== The site ==
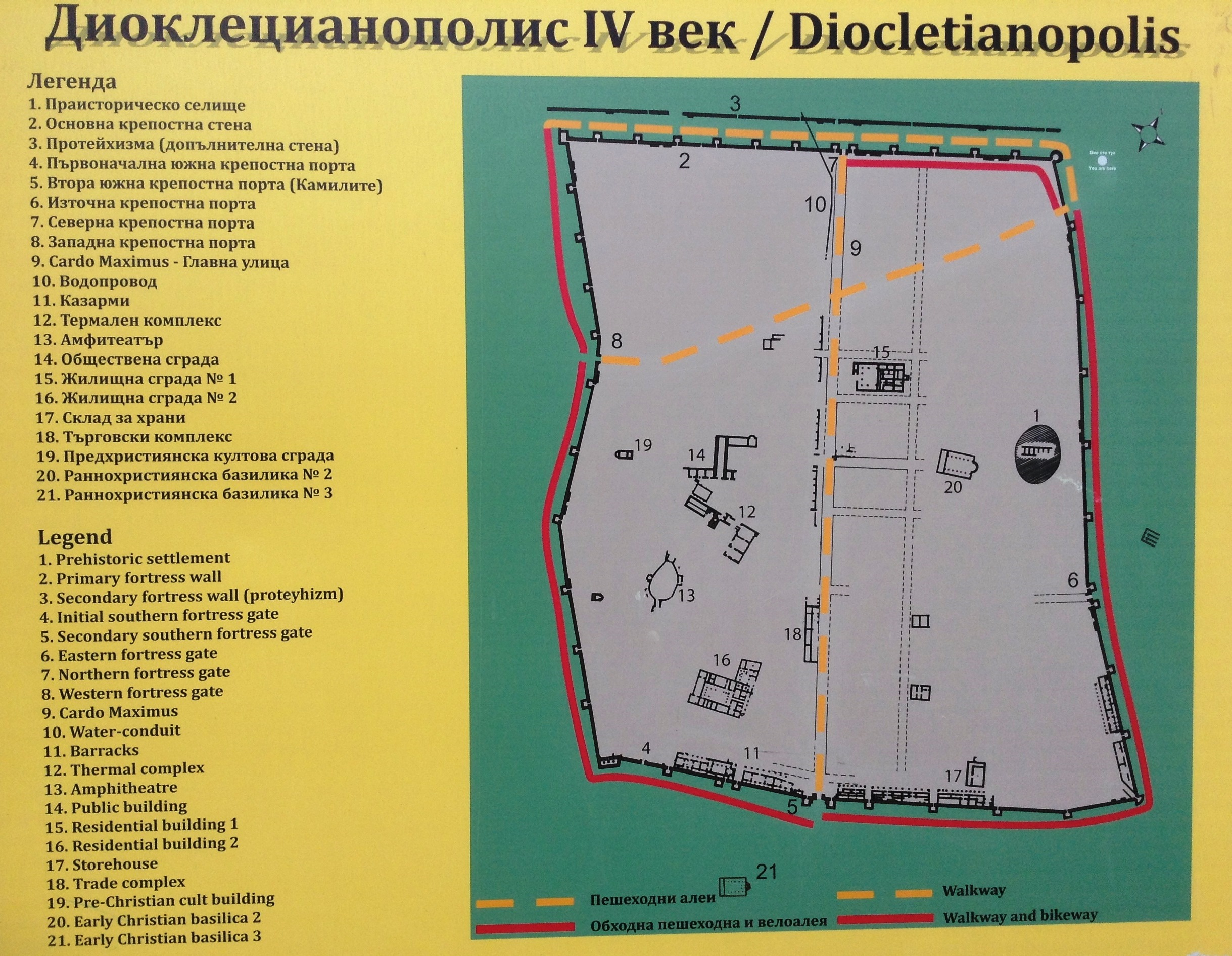
City Plan

The Roman city was situated on a terrace with valleys on three sides and centred on hot mineral springs.

Today the city's interior lies mostly buried under a green park.

Excavations are still uncovering more unknown and impressive parts of the city.

== History ==
Archaeological discoveries show that the site was inhabited as early as 6,000 B.C., probably due to the many hot mineral springs nearby. Later, a Thracian settlement developed there, and in the 4th and 5th centuries B.C., it became a major market town trading with Greek cities on the northern Aegean, as evidenced by the range of imported coins and pottery found.

In the 1st century A.D., Thrace was conquered by the Romans and the settlement eventually became a Roman city and one of the three most important towns in the province. It was first called Augusta.

The region centred on the city was declared an imperial domain at least in 135–36 A.D. under Hadrian, from an inscription discovered.

It was a famous resort indicated by the fact that emperor Septimius Severus visited the city. In 293, the Roman emperor Diocletian also came here, undoubtedly attracted by the mineral springs, and raised its official status as a city and renamed it. The city walls of 2.3 km total length were built in the early 4th century after the Gothic invasions.

After the fall of the Moesian Limes, the city declined until, between the end of 6th and beginning of the 7th centuries, it was destroyed during the Slavic migrations to the Balkans.

== Sights ==
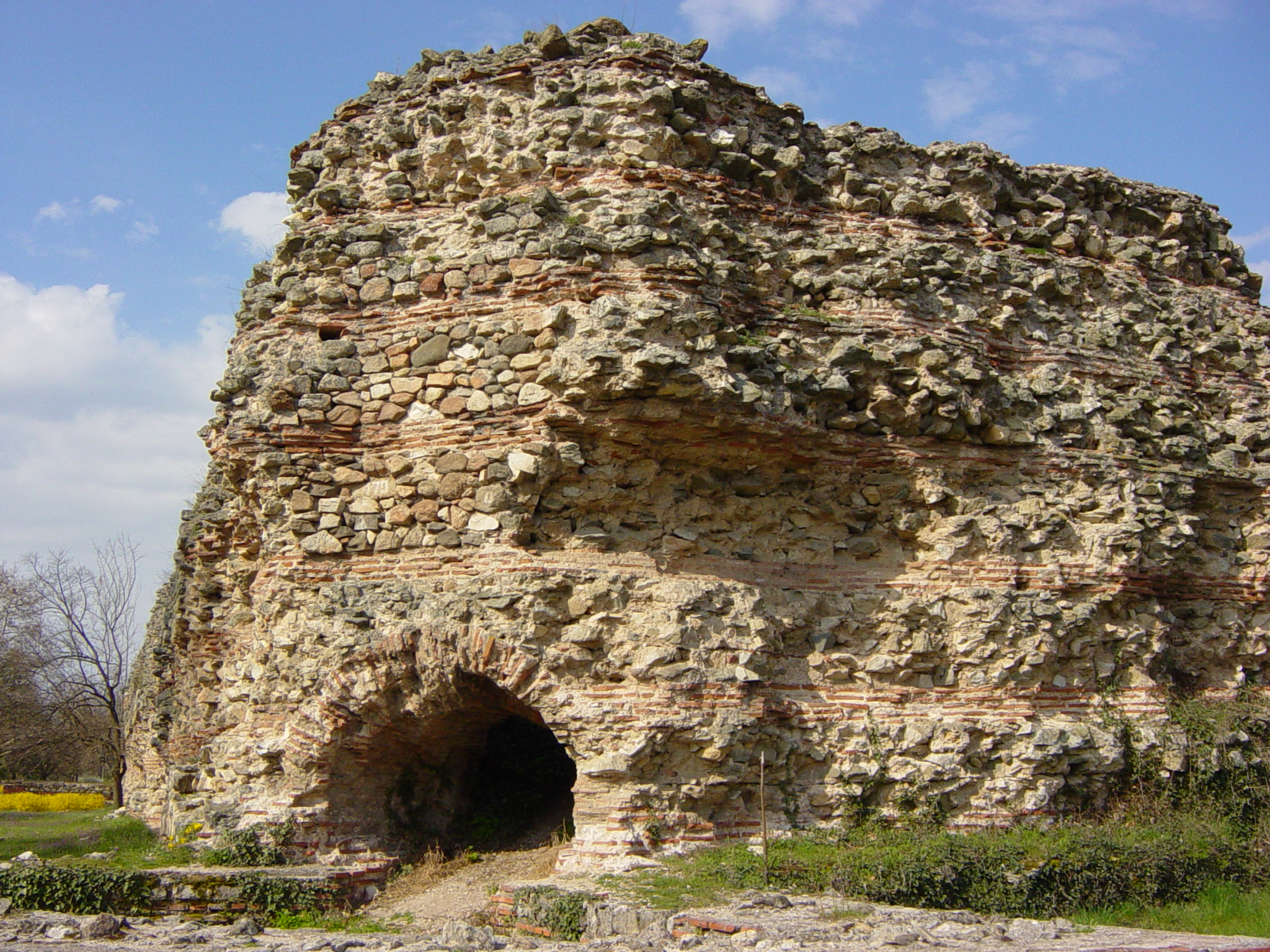
The city wall

Archaeological excavation is continuing to reveal more remains and many Roman remains are visible:

- the best-preserved and tallest Roman city walls anywhere, not only in Bulgaria
- thermal baths and nymphaeum
- an amphitheatre
- the barracks of the Roman garrison
- the tomb of a wealthy Roman
- the foundations of some of the oldest churches in Bulgaria.
- public buildings

The defensive walls are one of the very few examples that still stand at 11m close to their original height for the majority of their circuit. An additional, double, wall (as also was done uniquely at other Roman cities in Thrace) was built outside the northern section only where there was no exterior valley, to counter increasing threats from the Goths.

The thermal baths (thermae ) are still fed by hot springs and still have intact swimming pools. This building is still being excavated, but a nymphaeum was first built around the springs, as indicated by the many votive objects discovered, in the mid-2nd century. This was extended with 3 rooms to create thermal baths at the end of the century, and in the 4th c. further major extensions to the south and west created an enormous building. The baths were unusual by Roman standards as all the rooms were heated by the hot spring water by channeling the water flow, instead of by furnaces.

The amphitheatre is unusual in being close to the centre of the city and within the city walls. It is also of irregular pear-shape.

Five necropolises have been discovered outside the city and many tombs have been explored. The largest and richest tomb, with beautiful frescoes and floor mosaics, is open to the public. It was built in the second half of the 4th c. AD and was used twice. It was built underground of large stone ashlars and masonry with a long passage to the surface and covered with a large mound of earth.

== Gallery ==
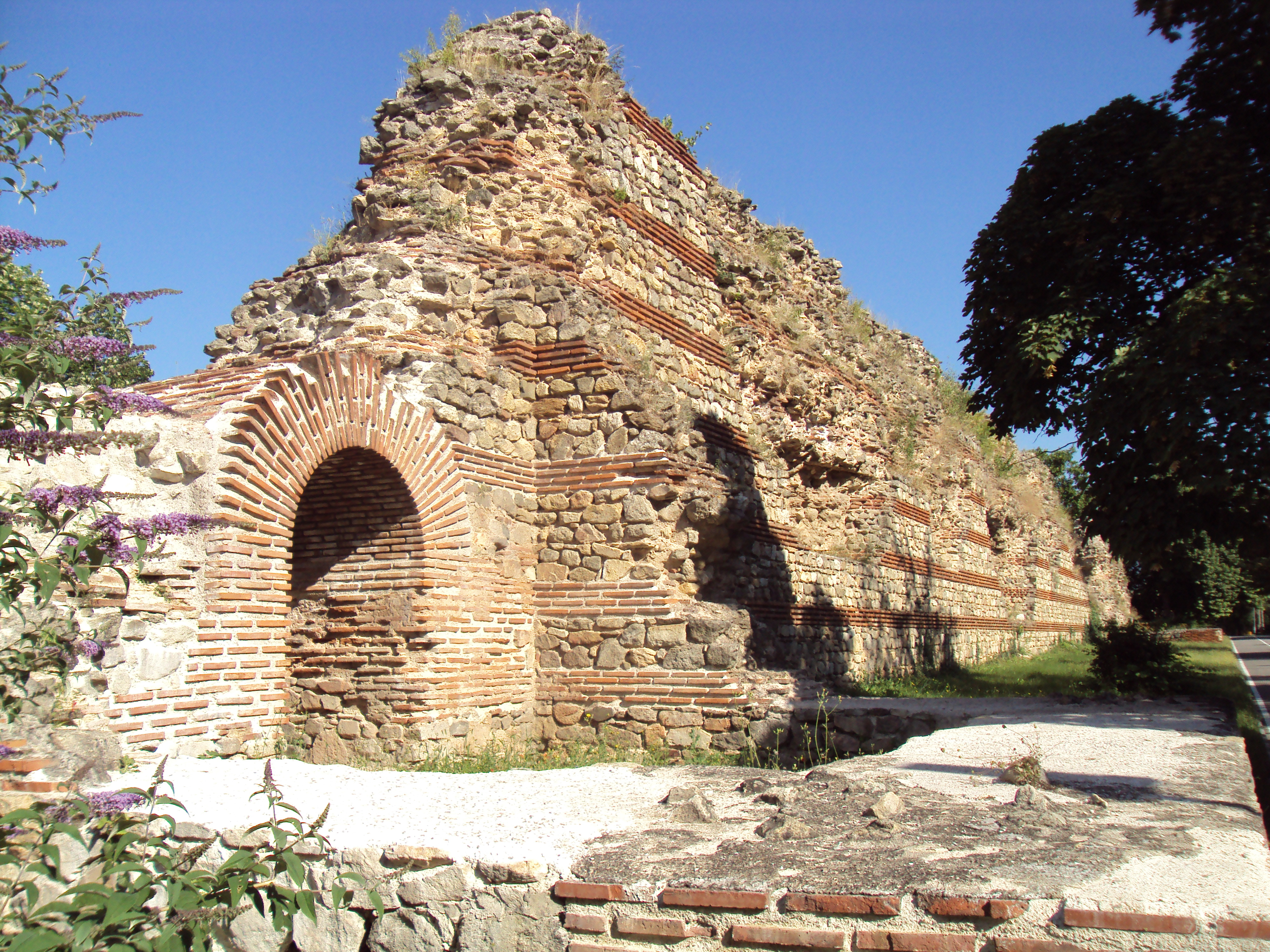
Hisarya Fortress

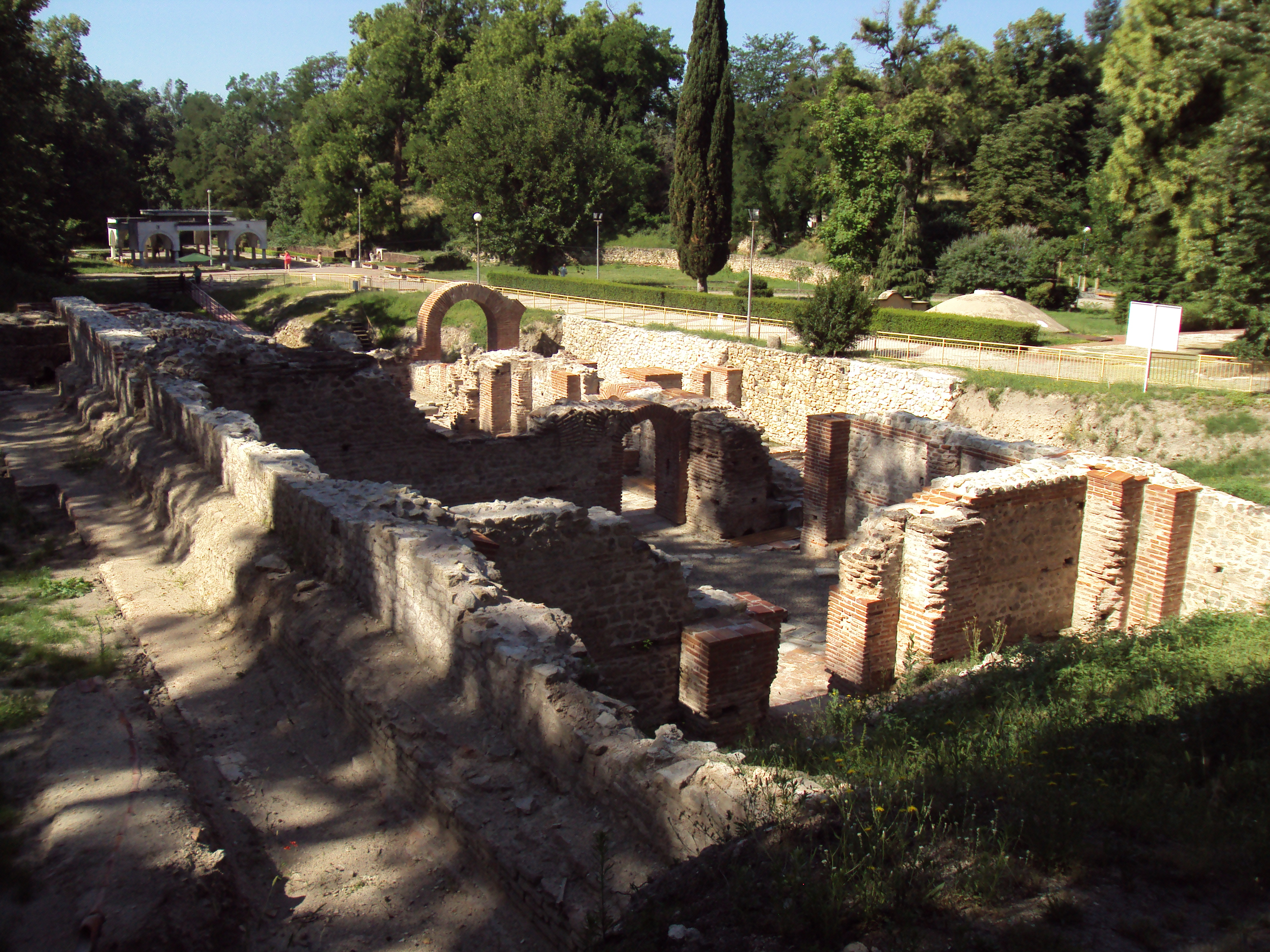
Roman Thermae

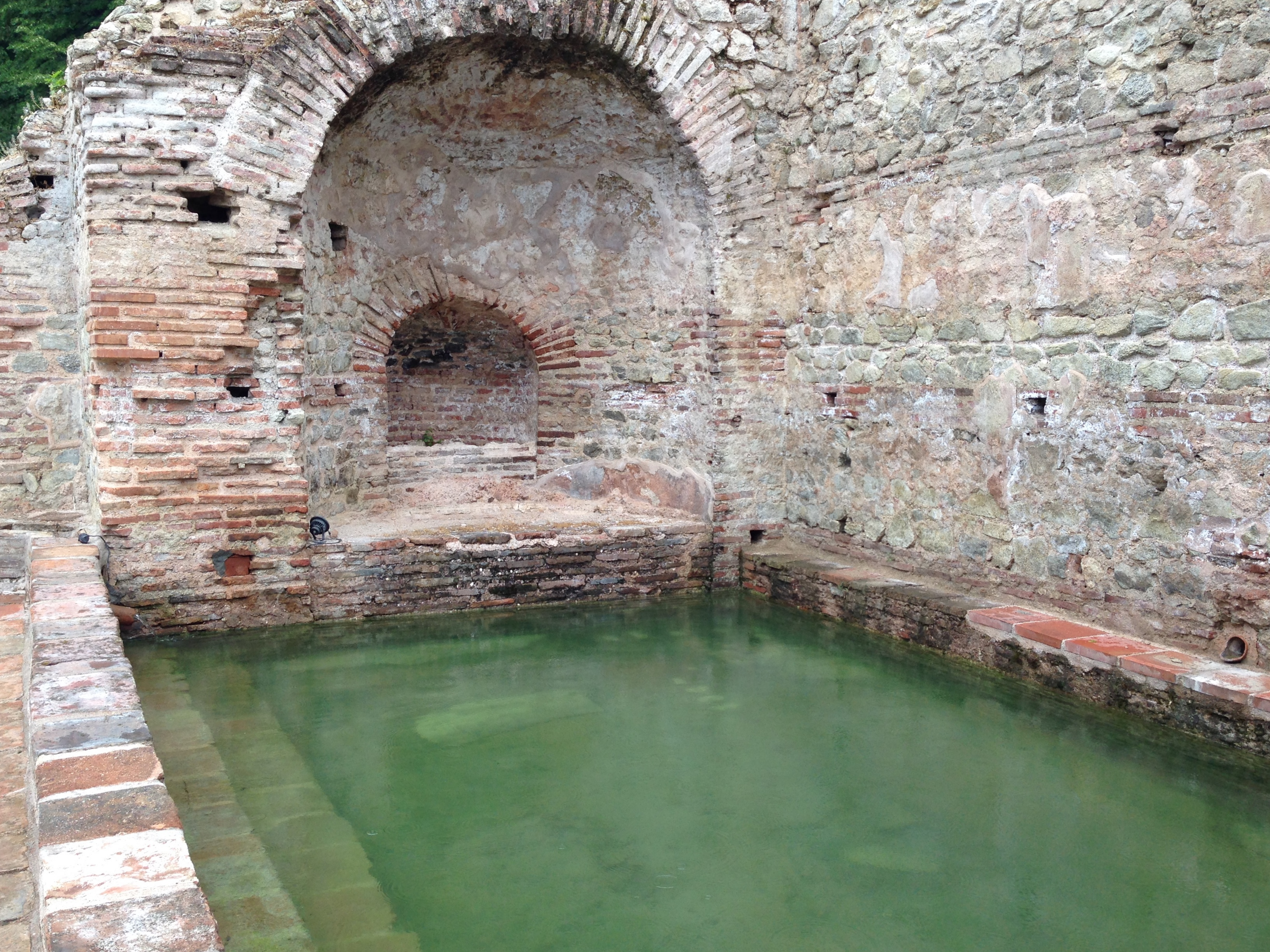
Baths: Caldarium pool

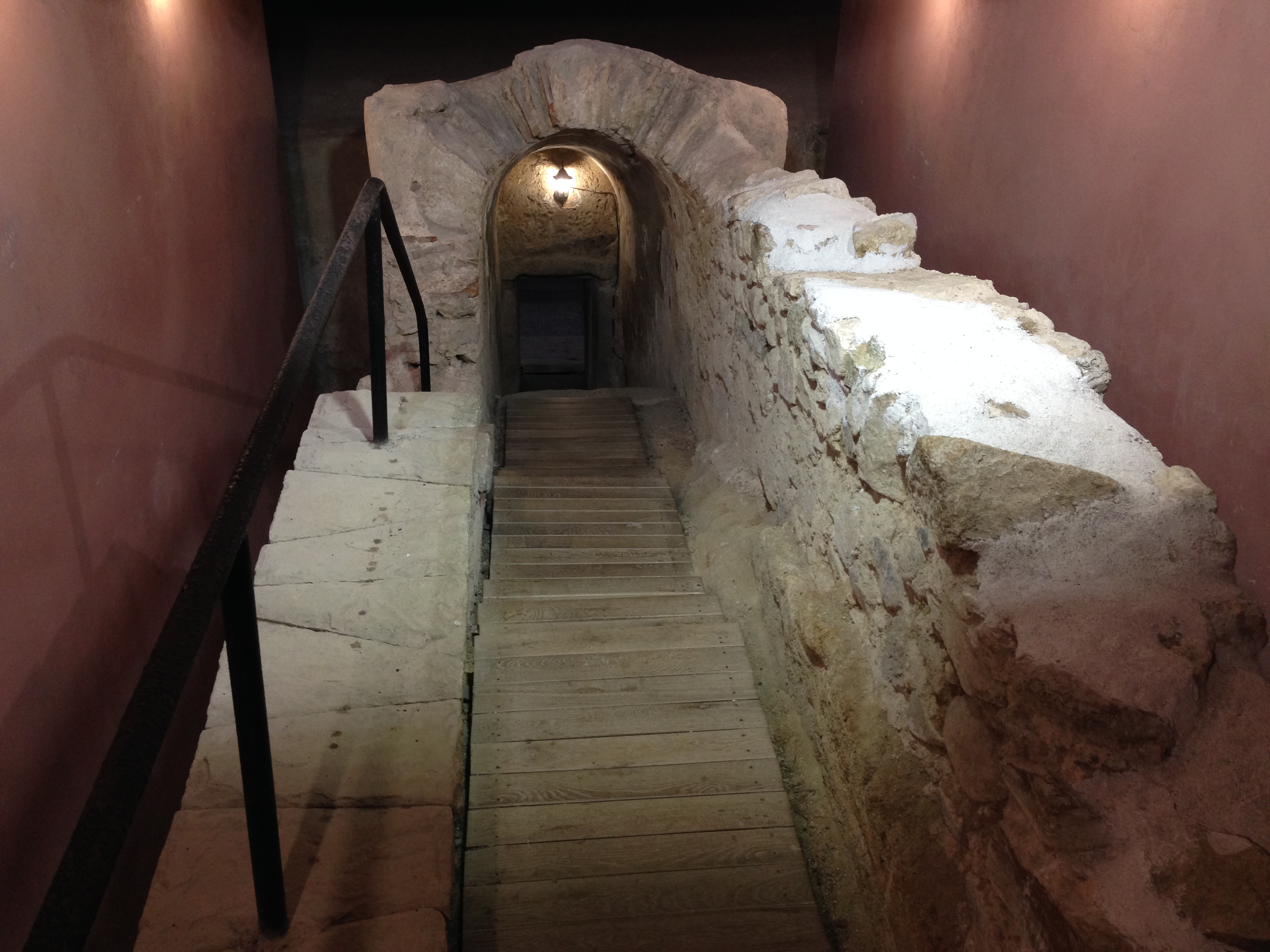
Roman tomb

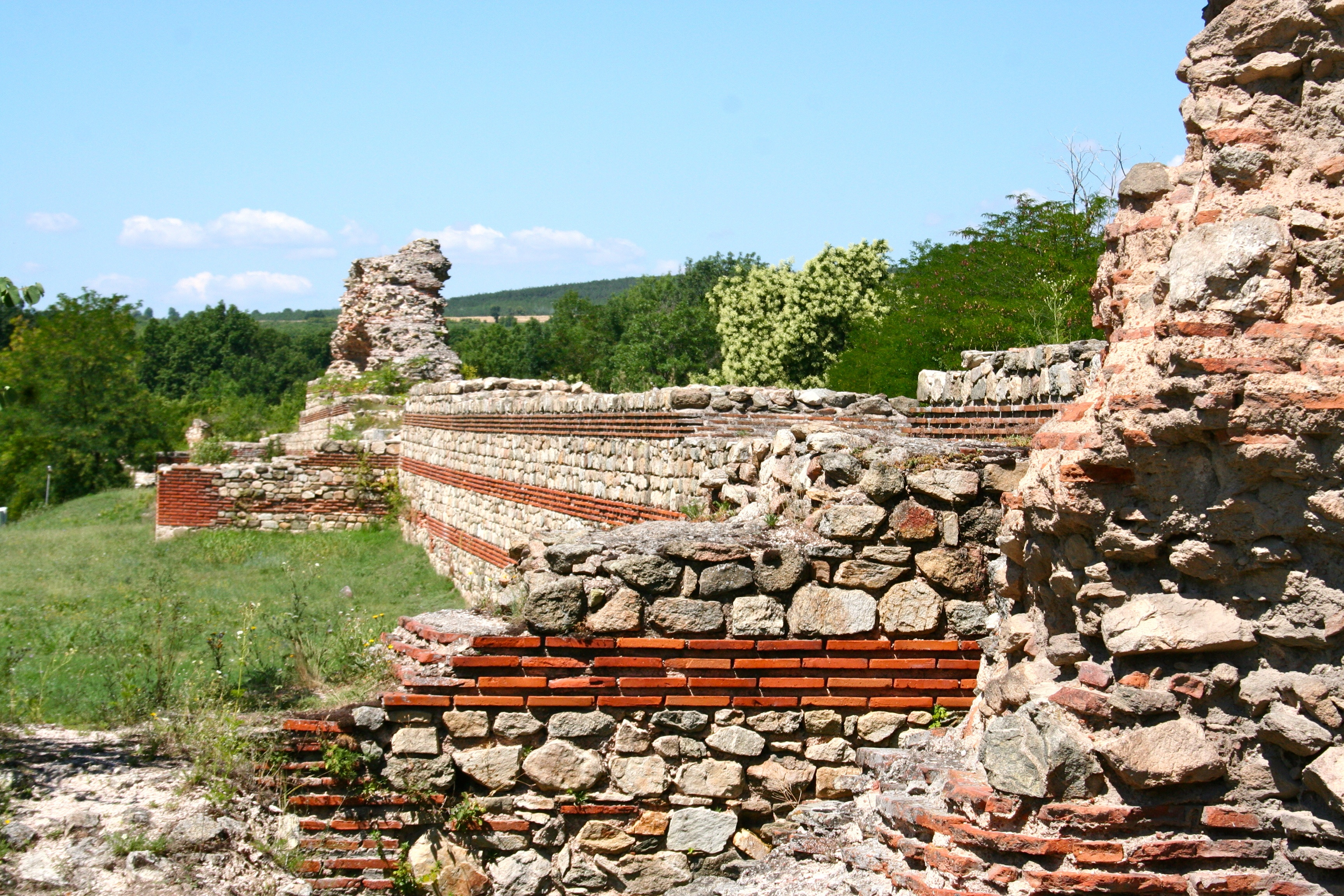
City walls
