= Peter (curopalates) =

Petrus (Greek: Πέτρος, Petros, also known as Peter in English (c. 545 in Arabissus, Cappadocia – late 602 in Constantinople or Chalcedon) was a brother of the Byzantine Emperor Maurice (r. 582 - 602).

== Background ==
Petrus was a son of Paul, head of the Byzantine Senate and a sibling to Maurice, Byzantine emperor; Gordia, the wife of Philippicus; and Theoctista. He had a son named Domitian, who became bishop of Melitene.

== Military career ==
Map of the Balkans during the 6th century.

Raised to the rank of curopalates, he was an important general in the Byzantine army. Together with Priscus and Comentiolus, he was one of the three commanders-in-chief during Maurice's Balkan campaigns.

Though less able than Priscus, he succeeded the latter as leader of the Roman forces in Moesia in 594, being more loyal to the emperor, his own brother. The reason for this replacement was Priscus' refusal to obey the emperor's orders to spend the winter on the northern Danube bank in 593 and to carry on fighting the Slavs.

Petrus defeated the Slavs in 594 near Marcianopolis and maintained the Danube between Novae and the Danube Delta. Later on, he crossed the Danube and fought his way to the Helibacia river, defeating numerous Slavic tribes in the course. 601, he crossed the Danube into Avar homeland and defeated them in several battles.

When in 602, his brother ordered his troops to spend the winter on the northern bank of the Danube, Petrus made no attempt to disobey this order, as opposed to Priscus in 593. Mutiny was the result. Although Petrus attempted to calm down his troops in vain, they marched to Constantinople and overthrew Maurice. Petrus was subsequently murdered.

Although Theophylact Simocatta portrayed Petrus as unable, relying on Priscus as only surviving witness, Petrus' expertise was sophisticated enough to put him forward as a candidate for the authorship of the Strategikon of Maurice.

Peter married Anastasia Aerobinda (born c. 570), daughter of Areobindus (born c. 550), and had female issue. Maurice's nephew Domitian of Melitene was probably a son of Peter.

== Literature ==
- Martindale, John R., ed. (1992). The Prosopography of the Later Roman Empire: Volume III, AD 527–641. Cambridge: Cambridge University Press. ISBN 0-521-20160-8.
- Whitby, Michael (1988). The Emperor Maurice and his Historian – Theophylact Simocatta on Persian and Balkan Warfare. Oxford: Oxford University Press. ISBN 978-0-19-822945-2.
