= Zaldapa =

Archaeological site in Bulgaria

Coordinates: 43°52′59″N 27°48′34″E

Zaldapa (Zeldepa, Ancient Greek: Ζάλδαπα, Ζέλδεπα) was a large Late Roman fortified city in Scythia Minor/Moesia, located near today's Abrit, Bulgaria.

== History and archaeology ==
The site was originally an ancient Thracian settlement from around the 8th century BC. The site of over 35 hectares (86 acres) was protected from the East, North and Northwest by a deep valley.

Excavations have revealed the defensive walls, a Roman civic basilica, an early Christian basilica with two crypts, and a huge water reservoir. The walls had 32 bastions of various shapes and 3 main and 2 secondary gates. The double north gate was designed to enclose and trap attackers.

Zaldapa is included in the list of fortifications renovated during the reign of Emperor Justinian I the Great (527–565). It was also mentioned as the seat of a bishop.

In 2015, a Greek stone inscription was discovered by the archaeologists excavating the ruins of a Christian bishop's basilica at Zaldapa.
