= Gate of Trajan =

Historic mountain pass in Sofia Province, Bulgaria

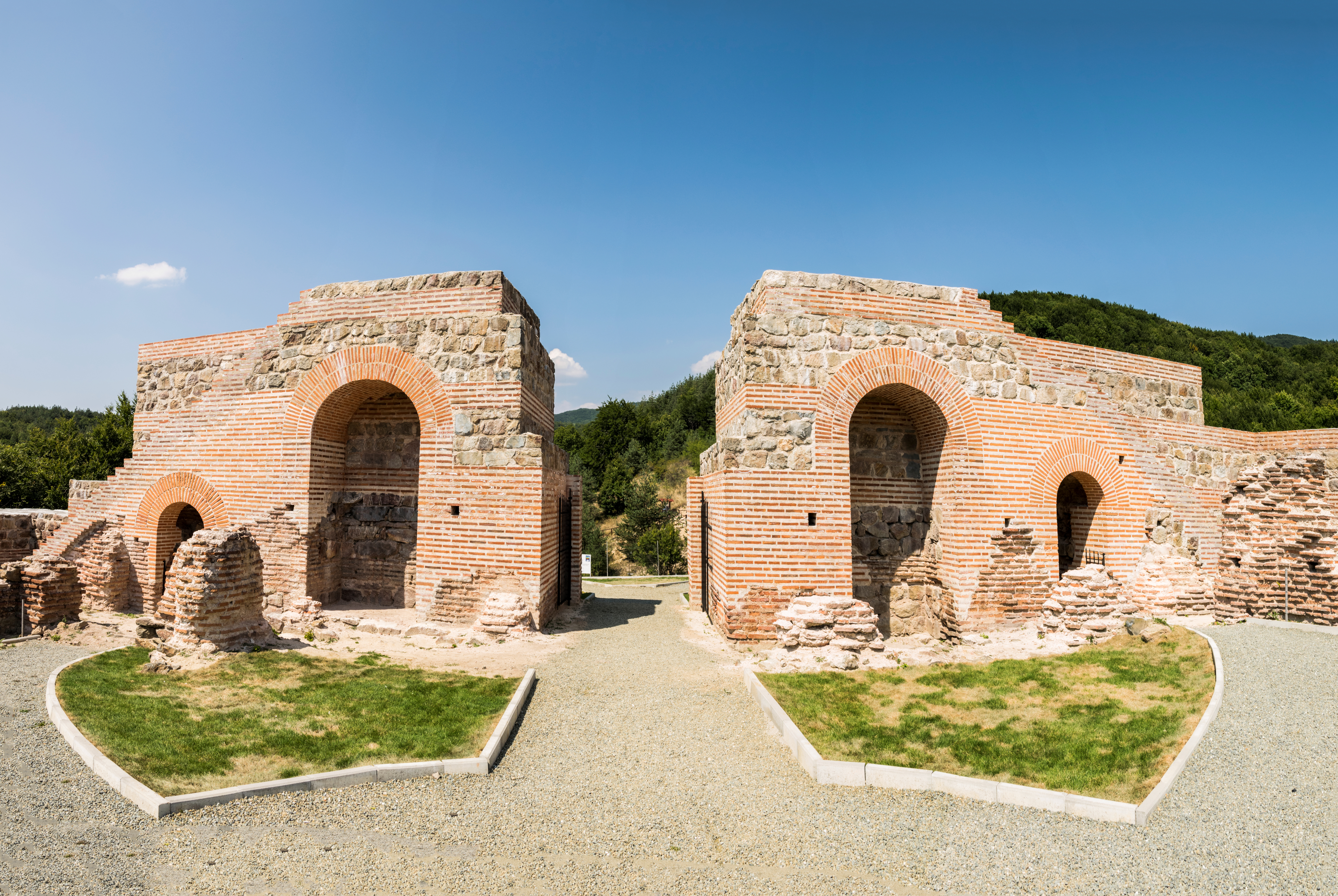
- Remnants of the Trajan's Gate fortress

- Location within Bulgaria
- Elevation: 800 m (2,600 ft)
- Traversed by: Trakia motorway

Location
- Location: Sofia Province, Bulgaria
- Coordinates: 42°21′22″N 23°55′06″E

The Gate of Trajan or Trajan's Gate (Bulgarian: Траянови врата, romanized: Trayanovi vrata) is a historic mountain pass near Ihtiman, Bulgaria. In antiquity, the pass was called Succi. Later it was named after Roman Emperor Trajan, on whose order a fortress by the name of Stipon was constructed on the hill over the pass, as a symbolic border between the provinces of Thrace and Macedonia.

The pass is primarily known for the major medieval battle of 17 August 986, during which the forces of Byzantine Emperor Basil II were routed by Tsar Samuil of Bulgaria, effectively halting a Byzantine campaign in the Bulgarian lands.

Today, a tunnel of the Trakiya motorway, similarly known as the Gate of Trajan Tunnel (тунел „Траянови врата“) is near the fortress, 55 kilometres (34 mi) from Sofia.

The saddle known as Trajan Gate on Graham Land, Antarctica is named after the Gate of Trajan.
