= Bayan I =

Khagan (emperor) of the Avar Khaganate from 562 to 602

Bayan I reigned as the first khagan of the Avar Khaganate between 562 and 602.

As the Göktürk Empire expanded westwards on the Eurasian Steppe during the 6th century, peoples such as the Avars (also known as the Pseudo-Avars, Obri, Abaroi and Varchonites) and the Bulgars migrated into Central and the Southeast Europe. Bayan I led the Avars (along with many Proto-Bulgarians) into Pannonia, where they established their khaganate from 568.

== Dealings with the Franks, Lombards and Gepids ==
By 562, the Avars and Bulgars had reached the Lower Danube: it was most likely in that year that Bayan became their supreme Khagan in the stead of the previous ruler, the Kutrigur khan Zabergan.

As allies of the Byzantine Empire of Justinian I (r. 527–565), the Avars had obtained a grant of gold to crush other nomads – the Sabirs, Utigurs, Kutrigurs and Saragurs – in the lands later known as Ukraine, a task they accomplished to the emperor's satisfaction. Bayan's Avars now demanded the renewal of the alliance, increased pay and a land to live in.

Bayan had eyed the plain of Moesia (just south of the Lower Danube in what would become northern Bulgaria) as his promised land, but the Byzantines were adamant the Avars should not in any case cross the Danube. So Bayan and his horde in 563 rode around the northern Carpathians to Germany, where they were soundly repelled along the river Elbe by the Frankish king Sigebert I of Austrasia. This defeat induced them to retrace their footsteps to the Lower Danube region. After vainly trying to force the Danubian border when the new Byzantine emperor Justin II (r. 565–578) denied them both entry and wage, the Avars renewed their ride to Thuringia. This time (566) they did defeat Sigebert, but had nonetheless to stop; in the meantime the Göktürks, in pursuit of their former subjects, remained a real danger.

The Avars, traditionally a nomadic people, desperately needed both shelter and pasture for their livestock, but the route to Pannonia was blocked by impassable mountains covered with thick forests: the Carpathian range. In the critical winter of 566–567 the Avars, stuck in present-day eastern Germany, were sent feelers by Alboin, the strong ruler of the Lombards and brother-in-law of Sigebert, who sought an alliance to crush his old enemies the Gepids. The latter, by chance, controlled the only practical way from the Lower Danube to the Avars' craved Pannonian pastures. So in 567 (see Lombard–Gepid War (567)) king Cunimund's Gepid kingdom was attacked from two directions: from the west came the Lombards, from the north, through Moravia and the Danube, the Avars. Bayan crushed Cunimund's forces and made a cup from his defeated enemy's skull as a present (and warning) for his ally Alboin (famed for having forced Cunimond's daughter Rosamund, whom he had taken as a war-bride, to drink from it, sealing his own fate). Then the Avar horde marched against Sirmium, by now firmly held by Gepid remnants and a Byzantine garrison led by general Bonosus. In the meantime large numbers of Slavs settled in Pannonia in the wake of the Avars; and in 568 Alboin and his Lombards deemed it wise to move to the half-ruined but promising lands of Italy where they would establish a long-lasting kingdom. They concluded however a treaty with the Avar Khagan allowing them to reenter parts of Pannonia and Noricum (Austria) if they chose to do so in the future; they then departed with large numbers of the vanquished Gepids and a host of other Germanic tribes.

== Wars with Byzantium ==
After ten years of uneasy peace, Bayan again marched against Sirmium, wresting it from Byzantine hands after a two-year siege. He then took Singidunum, evicting the Byzantines from the inner Balkans and opening the area to an unstoppable influx of Slavs, who within five years had flooded all the depopulated regions down to the Peloponnesus. In 582, Bayan attacked the Byzantines in Thrace, and extracted a large tribute of 100,000 solidii, roughly equivalent to 1,000 pounds (450 kg) of gold from the newly enthroned Byzantine emperor Maurice.

In later times Avars and Slavs still raided the remaining Byzantine lands as Maurice was hard pressed to defend his native Cappadocia and Armenia from the mighty Sassanians of Persia. By 592 the Byzantine ruler, once he defeated the Persian menace, was bent on revenge and counterattacked in full force, soon reverting the roles (see Maurice's Balkan campaigns). Repeated, massive defeats shook the Avaro-Slavic hordes as strong organized Byzantine armies penetrated north of the Danube into Wallachia, and eventually, under general Priscus, crushed the enemy along the river Tisza in the very heart of Pannonia. It was Phocas' rebellion against Maurice in 602 that ultimately saved the Avars. In the same year Khagan Bayan died, his empire now safe and firmly established.

== Sources ==
- Lászlo Makkai and András Mócsy, editors, 2001. History of Transylvania, II.4 "The period of Avar rule"
- Olajos, Thérèse (1976). "La chronologie de la dynastie avare de Baïan". Revue des études byzantines (in French). 34: 151–158. doi:10.3406/rebyz.1976.2050.

Preceded by Kandik	Avar Khagan; Kutrigur Ruler; 562-602	Succeeded by Bayan II
