= List of Latin place names in the Balkans =

This list includes countries and regions in the current common definition of the Balkans that were part of the Roman Empire, or that were given Latin place names in historical references.

== Background ==
Until the Modern Era, Latin was the common language for scholarship and mapmaking. During the 19th and 20th centuries, German scholars in particular have made significant contributions to the study of historical place names, or Ortsnamenkunde. These studies have, in turn, contributed to the study of genealogy. For genealogists and historians of pre-Modern Europe, knowing alternate names of places is vital to extracting information from both public and private records. Even specialists in this field point out, however, that the information can be easily taken out of context, since there is a great deal of repetition of place names throughout Europe; reliance purely on apparent connections should therefore be tempered with valid historical methodology.

== Caveats and notes ==
Latin place names are not always exclusive to one place – for example, there were several Roman cities whose names began with Colonia and then a more descriptive term. During the Middle Ages, these were often shortened to just Colonia. One of these, Colonia Agrippinensis, retains the name today in the form of Cologne.

Early sources for Roman names show numerous variants and spellings of the Latin names.

The modern canonical name is listed first. Sources are listed chronologically. In general, only the earliest source is shown for each name, although many of the names are recorded in more than one of the sources. Where the source differs in spelling, or has other alternatives, these are listed following the source. As an aid to searching, variants are spelled completely, and listed in most likely chronology.

Superscripts indicate:

1. Latinized form of the Greek-derived name.
2. Latinized form of the Asian-derived name via Greek.
3. Altered Latinized form of the Greek-derived name.

== Albania ==
Canonical Latin Name (source(s): variant(s))	English name (native language(s)) - older name(s), (other language(s)), location(s)
Amantia	Amantia
Antigonea	Gjirokastër
Antipatrea	Berat
Apollonia	Fier
Aulona	Vlorë
Buthrotum	Butrint
Bylis	Ballsh
Dyrrhachium (2PG15: Epidaurus)	Durrës
Lissus (2PG15)	Lezhë - Lyssos
Scodra (2PG15)	Shkodër - Shkodra - Scutari
Tyrana (GOL)	Tirana
Valebona	Tropojë

== Bosnia and Herzegovina ==
Canonical Latin Name (source(s): variant(s))	English name (native language(s)) - older name(s), (other language(s)), location(s)
Aquae Sulphurae	Ilidža
Neuense	Neum
Pelva	Livno - Ludricensis
Saloniana (2PG15)	Mostar - Vitrinica
Salvia (2PG15), Salvium	Glamoč
Serbinum, Servitium	Gradiška

== Bulgaria ==
Canonical Latin Name (source(s): variant(s))	English name (native language(s)) - older name(s), (other language(s)), location(s)
Abritum, Abrittus	Razgrad
Aetus, Astus, Idus, Aquilia	Aytos
Almus, Artanus	Lom
Anchialus	Pomorie
Apollonia Pontica, Appolonia Magna, Antheia, Sozopolis	Sozopol
Augusta Traiana, Augustra Trajana	Stara Zagora
Aurea	Zlatitsa
Bononia	Vidin
Copsis	Karlovo
Debeltum, Pyrgus	Burgas
Diocletianopolis	Hisarya
Dionysopolis	Balchik
Diospolis	Yambol
Durostorum	Silistra
Escus, Oescus	Gigen
Germanea	Separeva Banya
Magura Piatra, Regianum, Camistrum, Augusta	Kozloduy
Marcianopolis	Devnya
Melta, Praesidium, Caesaria	Lovech
Menebria, Mesembria, Metropolis Nova	Nesebar
Montana, Municipium Montanensium	Montana
Nicopolis	Nikopol
Nicopolis ad Istrum	Nikyup (20 km north of Veliko Tarnovo)
Nicopolis ad Nestum, Neurocopia	Gotse Delchev, Nevrokop
Novae	Svishtov
Odessus¹	Varna
Pautalia	Kyustendil
Peronticus, Agathopolis	Ahtopol
Ratiaria	Archar
Scaptopara	Blagoevgrad
Serdica	Sofia
Sexaginta Prista	Ruse
Stenimachus	Asenovgrad
Stipum	Ihtiman
Storgosia	Pleven
Trimontium, Philippopolis	Plovdiv
Ulpia Oescus, Palatiolum	Gigen
Valve	Vratsa

== Croatia ==
Canonical Latin Name (source(s): variant(s))	English name (native language(s)) - older name(s), (other language(s)), location(s)
Aenona (2PG15)	Nin (Nona)
Aequum (2PG15)	Čitluk, near Sinj Split-Dalmatia County
Albona	Labin (Albona)
Andautonia	Ščitarjevo near Zagreb
Aqua Balissae	Daruvar
Aqua Viva	Petrijanec near Varaždin
Aquama	Čakovec
Cibalae	Vinkovci
Epidaurus (2PG15), Epidauros	Cavtat
Flanona (2PG15)	Plomin (Fianona)
Flumen	Rijeka (Fiume), (Terra Fluminis Sancti Viti)
Iadera (2PG15: Iader)	Zadar (Zara)
Issa (2PG15)	Vis (Lissa)
Lopsica (2PG15)	Sveti Juraj
Marsonia	Slavonski Brod
Mursa	Osijek
Narona (2PG15)	Vid, near Metković
Neapolis-Aemonia	Novigrad (Cittanova)
Nesactium	Vizače
Oneum (2PG15: Onaeum)	Omiš
Parentium	Poreč (Parenzo)
Petina	Pićan (Pedena)
Pharus	Hvar (Lesina)
Piquentum	Buzet (Pinguente)
Pola	Pula (Pola), Pulj
Ragusa	Dubrovnik (Ragusa)
Rocium (or Rotium)	Roč (Rozzo)
Salona (2PG15)	Solin (Salona)
Scardona (2PG15)	Skradin
Senia (2PG15)	Senj (Segna, Zengg)
Siscia	Sisak
Spalatum	Split (Spalato)
Tarsatica (2PG15)	Trsat (Tersatto) (near Rijeka)
Tragurion (2PG15: Tragurium)	Trogir (Traù)
Vegium	Karlobag

== Greece ==
Canonical Latin Name (source(s): variant(s))	English name (native language(s)) - older name(s), (other language(s)), location(s)
Acharnae¹	Acharnes, Menidi
Aegina	Aegina
Agrinium¹	Agrinio - Agrinion
Alexandropolis¹	Alexandroupolis
Almyrus¹	Almyros
Amphilochia¹	Amphilochia
Amphipolis¹	Amphipolis
Amphissa¹	Amphissa - Amfissa
Argos¹	Argos
Atalanta	Atalante - Atalanta
Athenae¹	Athens
Berroea	Verroia - Berrea
Carystus¹	Carystos - Carystus
Cenchreae¹	Kechries - Cenchreae, near Corinth
Chalcis¹	Chalkida, Euboea
Corcyra³	Corfu
Corinthus¹	Corinth
Delphi¹	Delphi
Dodona¹	Dodona
Eleusis¹	Eleusis
Epidaurus¹	Epidaurus
Gythium	Gytheion
Heracleium¹	the port of Knossos, perhaps Amnisos, east of modern Iraklion, Crete (the name Iraklion/Herakleion for the medieval and modern city only dates from around 1900)
Isthmia¹	Isthmia, slightly east of Corinth
Laurium, (Thoricum before mid-1st century BC)	Laurium - Laurion
Leucas	Lefkada - Lefkas - Leucas
Marathon, Marathonis¹	Marathon
Megalopolis¹	Megalopolis
Megara	Megara, west of Athens
Mycenae	Mycenae (Mykênes, Mykênai)
Naupactus	Na(u)fpaktos
Nauplium¹	Na(u)fplion
Nemea¹	Nemea
Nicopolis¹	Nicopolis
Nova Ionia (Athenae)	Nea Ionia - New Ionia, Athens
Nova Ionia (Thessalia)	Nea Ionia - New Ionia, Thessaly
Olympia¹	Olympia
Olympias¹	Olympias - Olympiada
Orchomenos¹	Orchomenus
Paeania¹	Paiania - Paeania
Patrae¹, Ares Patrensis	Patras
Phalerum	Phaleron - Faliron
Philippi	Philippi
Piraeus	Piraeus
Potidaea¹	Potidaea - Potidaia
Salamis¹	Salamis
Sparta¹	Sparta
Tegea	Tegea, near Tripoli
Thebae (Boeotia/Athenae)	Theva - Thebes
Thermopylae¹	Thermopylae
Thessalonica, Salonica¹	Thessaloniki, Saloniki - Salonika, Makedonia
Tripolis	Tripoli
Troezen, Troezena¹	Troezen
Uranopolis¹	Uranopoli - some prefer Uranopolis
Zycanthus, Zacynthus¹	Zante - Zakynthos

== Kosovo ==
Canonical Latin Name (source(s): variant(s))	English name (native language(s)) - older name(s), (other language(s)), location(s)
Theranda	Prizren
Ulpiana	Lipjan
Vicianum	Vushtrri

== Montenegro ==
Canonical Latin Name (source(s): variant(s))	English name (native language(s)) - older name(s), (other language(s)), location(s)
Acruvium	Kotor
Anagastum, Anderva, Anderba	Nikšić
Antipargal (Antibarium, 10th century)	Bar
Birziminium	Podgorica (Titograd, Ribnica)
Colchinium, Olcinium, Ulcinium	Ulcinj
D(i)oclea	Duklja
Rhizon (2PG15: Rhisium), Rhizinium, Risinium	Risan

== North Macedonia ==
Canonical Latin Name (source(s): variant(s))	English name (native language(s)) - older name(s), (other language(s)), location(s)
Lychnidus	Ohrid
Monasterium	Bitola
Scopium, Scupium	Skopje
Stibo, Estipium	Štip

== Romania ==
Canonical Latin Name (source(s): variant(s))	English name (native language(s)) - older name(s), (other language(s)), location(s)
Abruttus	Abrud
Aegyssus	Tulcea
Ad Aquas	Călan
Ad Mediam	Mehadia
Ad Pannonios	Teregova
Ad Stoma	Brețcu
Alburnus Maior	Roșia Montană
Altinum	Oltina
Ampelum	Zlatna
Angustia	Râșnov
Apulum	Alba Iulia
Arcidava	Vărădia
Arrubium	Măcin
Arutela	Călimănești
Bersobis, Berzobis	Berzovia
Brucla	Aiud
Calatis, Callatis	Mangalia (Tomisovara), (Panglicara, Pangalia)
Caput Stenarum	Boița
Carsium	Hârșova
Centum Putea	Surducu Mare
Cibinum	Sibiu, Sibiu County
Colonia Ulpia Traiana	Sarmizegetusa
Corona, Civitas Coronensis	Brașov, (Kronstadt, Brassó)
Dierna	Orșova
Drobeta	Drobeta-Turnu Severin
Forum Novum Siculorum	Târgu-Mureș, Mureș County
Germisara	Geoagiu
Iassium	Iași
Media	Mediaș, Sibiu County
Micia	Vețel
Napoca, Claudiopolis	Cluj-Napoca
Noviodunum	Isaccea, Tulcea County
Porolissum	Moigrad
Potaissa	Turda
Praetorium	Copăceni, Vâlcea County
Resculum	Bologa
Romula-Malva	Reșca Dobrosloveni
Salinae	Ocna Mureș
Sucidava	Celei
Tapae	Poarta de Fier a Transilvaniei
Temesiensis	Timișoara, Timiș County
Tibiscum	Jupa, Caraș-Severin
Tomis	Constanța
Troesmis	Iglița (Turcoaia)
Ulmetum	Pantelimonul de Sus, Constanța County
Varadinum	Oradea

== Turkey ==
Canonical Latin Name (source(s): variant(s))	English name (native language(s)) - older name(s), (other language(s)), location(s)
Adrianopolis	Edirne - Adrianople
Byzantium	Istanbul, Constantinople
Constantinopolis	Istanbul, Constantinople
Roma Nova	Istanbul, Constantinople

== Serbia ==
Canonical Latin Name (source(s): variant(s))	English name (native language(s)) - older name(s), (other language(s)), location(s)
Acumincum	Stari Slankamen - Slankamen
Bassianae	Donji Petrovci
Bononia	Banoštor
Burgenae	Novi Banovci
Cusum	Petrovaradin
Lederata	Rama
Naissus	Niš
Neoplanta	Novi Sad
Remesiana	Bela Palanka
Rittium	Surduk
Semendria	Smederevo
Singidunum	Belgrade (Beograd)
Sirmium	Sremska Mitrovica
Taurunum	Zemun
Viminacium (2PG15: Iminacium)	Kostolac

== Slovenia ==
Canonical Latin Name (source(s): variant(s))	English name (native language(s)) - older name(s), (other language(s)), location(s)
Ad Pirum	Hrušica
Aegida, Capris, Caput Histriae	Koper (Capodistria)
Arae Postumiae	Postojna
Atrans	Trojane
Carnium, Carnioburgum	Kranj
Castra	Ajdovščina
Celeia	Celje
Emona, Aemona, Labacum	Ljubljana
Lithopolis	Kamnik
Longaticum	Logatec
Marburgum	Maribor
Nauportus	Vrhnika
Neviodunum	Drnovo
Poetovio	Ptuj
Pyrrhanum	Piran (Pirano)

== See also ==
- Chemical elements named after places (several element names employ Latin place names)
- List of Latin place names used as specific names
