= Pannonia =

Province of the Roman Empire (8/9 - 433 AD)

Coordinates: 44.9000°N 19.0200°E

Provincia Pannonia
- 8/9 – 433 AD
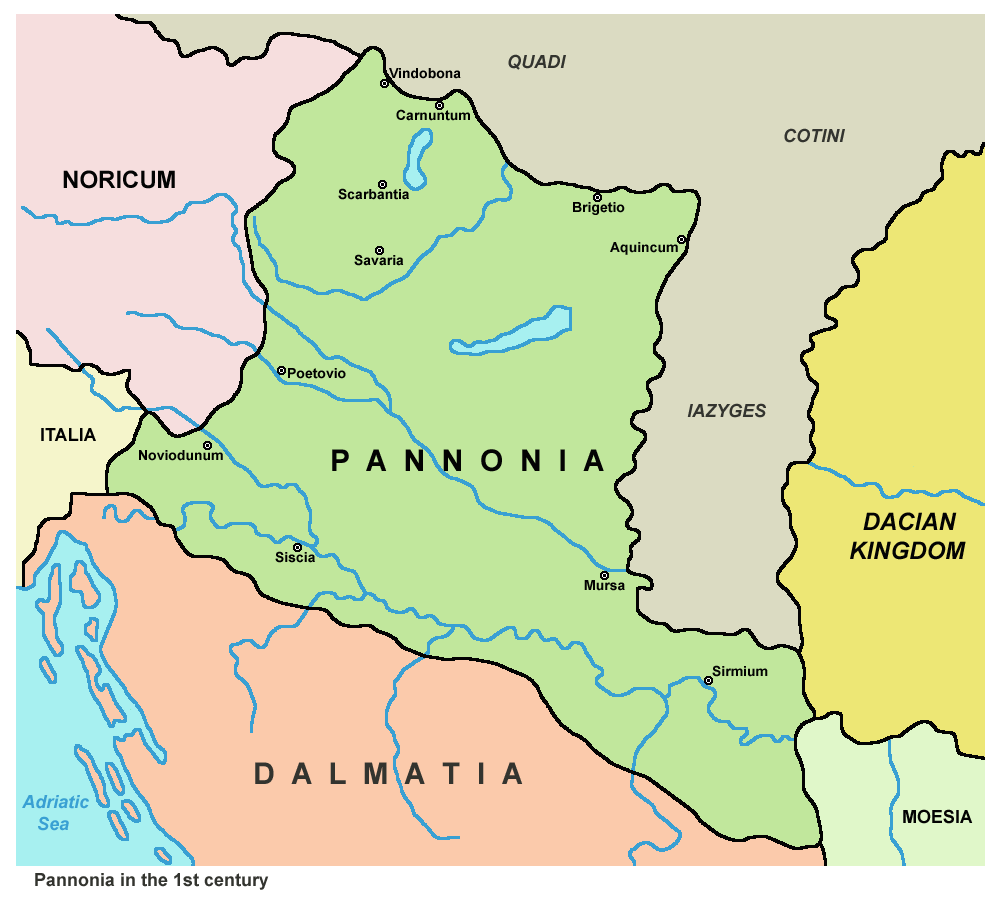
- Province of Pannonia in the first century AD
- Capital: Carnuntum, Sirmium, Savaria, Aquincum, Poetovio or Vindobona
- Demonym: Pannonian
- Historical era: Classical antiquity
  - Established via separation from Illyricum: 8/9
  - The Western Roman Empire officially cedes Pannonia to the Hunnic Empire: 433 AD

Pannonia (/pəˈnoʊniə/, Latin: [panˈnɔnia]) was a province of the Roman Empire bounded on the north and east by the Danube, on the west by Noricum and upper Italy, and on the south by Dalmatia and upper Moesia. It included the modern regions of western Hungary, western Slovakia, eastern Austria, northern Croatia, north-western Serbia, northern Slovenia, and northern Bosnia and Herzegovina.

== Background ==
In the Early Iron Age, Transdanubia was inhabited by the Pannonians or Pannonii, (Note: Whose name the toponym "Pannonia" stems from.) a collection of Illyrian tribes. Other tribes invaded the region during the Late Iron Age, and Gallo-Roman historian Pompeius Trogus wrote that they faced heavy resistance from the locals, which eventually prevented them from overrunning the southern part of Transdanubia. Some tribes advanced as far as Delphi, with the Scordisci settling in Syrmia (279 BC) upon being forced to withdraw. Additionally, arrival of various groups in Transdanubia disrupted the flow of amber from the Baltic Sea region, through the Amber Road, to the Illyrians. They founded many villages. Those that held prominent economic significance developed into oppida. Independent tribes minted their own coins with the faces of their leaders. These were at first modelled on Macedonian and, later, Roman currency.

Upon the Scordisci's withdrawal and settlement, they and the Dardani (in Dardania) both became strong powers that opposed each other. The Dardani consistently raided Macedon and developed close ties to Rome. Philip V of Macedon, who was a vehement enemy of the Dardani, allied with the Scordisci and, in 179 BC, persuaded the Bastarnae (at the Danube Delta) to break into Italy and subdue them on the way. Despite Philip's defeat at the hands of the Romans in 197 BC and the failure of the Bastarnae, at this time the Dardani's power crumbled under the pressure from the Macedonians and Scordisci. Finally, Perseus annihilated them, giving way to a hundred years of Scordisci hegemony in the Balkans. During this time, the tribe started raiding the new province of Macedonia, and —Strabo says— expanded as far as Paeonia, Illyria, and Thrace.

Aquileia's foundation in 181 BC was the first step towards the Roman takeover of Pannonia. The town served as the starting station of the Amber Road and the launching point for attacks in that direction. The Scordisci, in alliance with the Dalmatae, were in armed conflict with the Romans as early as 156 BC and 119 BC. In both wars, the Romans failed to conquer Siscia (now Sisak, Croatia), which lay in a key position. After these setbacks, Rome turned its attention to Noricum, which had both iron and silver mines.

As part of a new Celtic migration wave at the end of the 2nd century BC, the Boii left Northern Italy and established themselves as a significant power on the Danube. According to Posidonius's record of the Cimbri migration (preserved by Strabo), they were first repulsed by the Boii, then by the Scordisci, and then by the Taurisci towards the Helvetii. This describes the balance of power in the region. In the early 1st century BC, the Dacians emerged as a new dominant power. While their hold on the area between the Danube and the Tisza river was loose, they had considerable influence in the territories beyond. In 88 BC, Scipio Asiaticus (consul 83 BC) defeated the Scordisci so badly that they retreated to the eastern part of Syrmia. Taking advantage of this situation, the Dacian king Burebista vanquished them sometime between 65 and 50 BC, and subsequently the Boii (Note: Hence the name deserta Boiorum ('desert of the Boii') used even by Pliny the Elder in his Natural History.) and the Taurisci too. Thanks to the ebb of these entities, several local tribes regained their independence and influence. In the context of Mithridates VI Eupator's unfulfilled plan to invade Italy from the north (64 BC), the territory he was to cross is noted to have belonged to the Pannonians. Immediately after Burebista's death (c. 44 BC), Dacia's kingdom dissolved too, leaving no entity in the region that Rome would make allowances for.

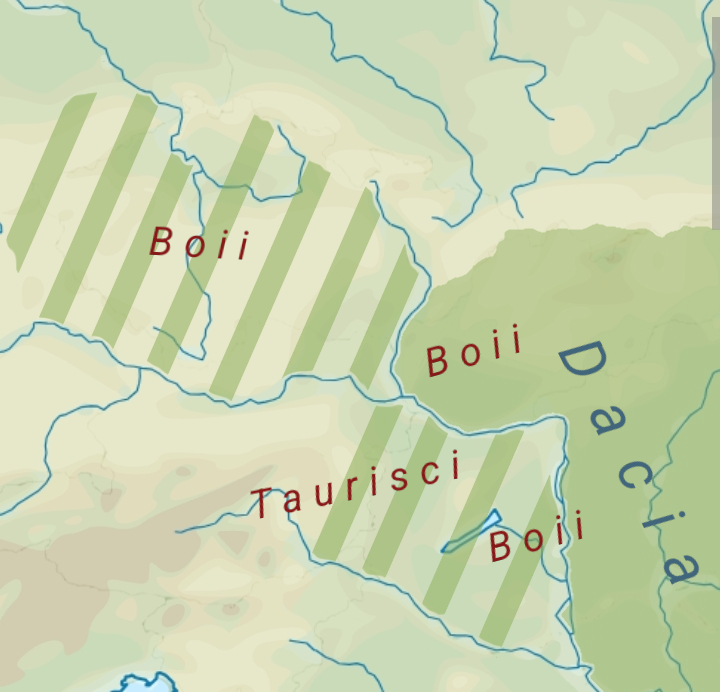
Map showing Burebista's dominance over Pannonia and Bohemia

== Roman conquest ==
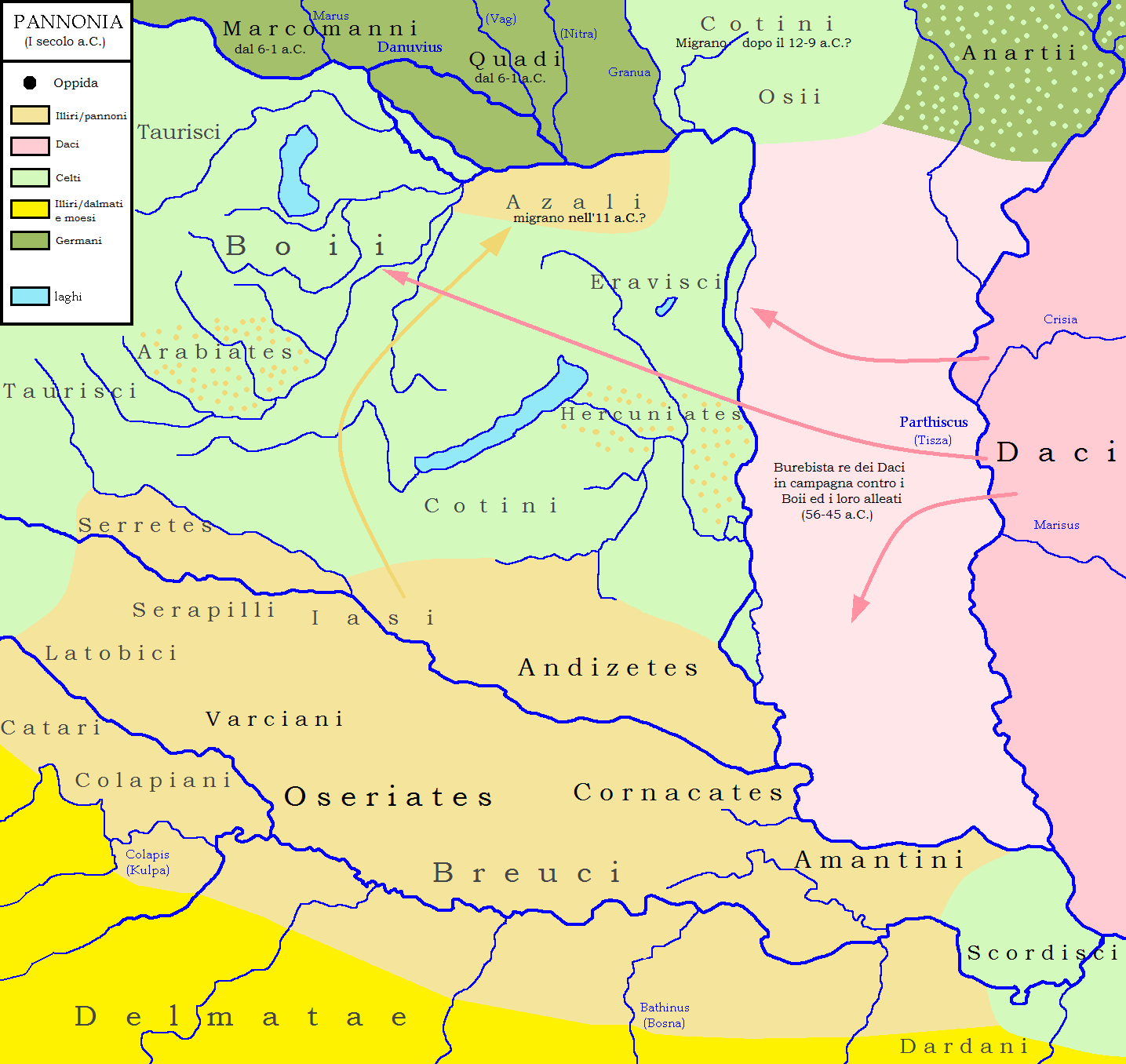
People of Transdanubia and its surroundings before the Roman conquest

The Pannonians were driven into conflict due to their support of the Dalmatae in their strife against Rome, but they were not long-term and known enemies. The tribes north of the Drava River did not participate in this, nor in the subsequent fights. In 35 BC, Octavian led a campaign against the Iapydes and the Pannonians, in which he captured Siscia in a month-long siege and occupied a large part of the Sava River valley. This was in accordance with Caesar's plan of creating a base for an invasion of Dacia, not realized due to his assassination. However, Octavian only used the hoax of the "Dacian threat" as a pretense to gain control over a large amount of land in the Second Triumvirate.

In 15 BC, the future emperor Tiberius defeated the Scordisci, forcing them to become allies. This was in response to Pannonian and Scordisci incursions the previous year. The following events were part of the Roman Empire's efforts to reach the Danube and are sometimes known thematically as Bellum Pannonicum.

In 14 BC, the Pannonians rose up. Vipsanius Agrippa was sent to the region after another rebellion in 13 BC. After his death the following year, the campaign was taken over by Tiberius, who celebrated his triumph in 11 BC. The province of Illyricum was established between the Sava and the Adriatic Sea. In 10 BC, Tiberius returned to quell a new uprising of the Pannonians and Dalmatae. After winning in 9 BC, he sold the youth of the Breuci and Amantini as slaves in Italy and held an ovation. His operations between 12 and 9 BC included constant expeditions into territories north of the Drava and almost certainly brought the whole Transdanubia under Roman control, even though there's no direct evidence for that.

Through Tiberius Nero, then my stepson and legate, I brought under Roman authority the Pannonian peoples, which no Roman army had approached before I became princeps and advanced the boundaries of Illyricum to the bank of the Danube.

— Augustus, Res Gestae Divi Augusti, chapter 30

Pannonia was invaded by the Dacians in 10 BC. The Romans launched campaigns through the Danube in order to secure it as the imperial border and defend the threatened new land. Lucius Domitius Ahenobarbus's (consul 16 BC) operation in 1 AD extended as far as the Elbe. In 10 AD, Cornelius Lentulus Augur was able to debar not just the Dacians, but also the Sarmatians "from access to the Danube", says Florus. Locally more important was the offensive of Marcus Vinicius against the tribes east of the Danube Bend, showing an intent of "monopolizing" the Northern Transdanubian region politically. The last decade of the century saw the Marcomanni under their king Maroboduus, settling north of Pannonia. Augustus planned a two-sided attack on them, with one army approaching their territory from the Rhine and another one under Tiberius crossing the Danube at Carnuntum.

Before witnessing any result, Tiberius had to rush back in 6 AD and face a new uprising. (Note: Which was motivated by an order of conscription (from governor Valerius Messala Messallinus) among the tribesmen, according to Cassius Dio.) The unfolding Bellum Batonianum lasted for three years. The Breuci (under Bato the Breucian) and Daesitiates (under Bato the Daesitiate and Pinnes) took the leading role, while the tribes north of the Drava stayed out again. The insurgents attempted to invade Italy and Macedonia, but due to their lack of success, they united to besiege Sirmium (now Sremska Mitrovica, Serbia). There, Caecina Severus defeated the insurgents, who retreated into the Fruška gora Mountains. He annihilated them the following year when they tried to intercept him on his way to join Tiberius at Siscia. Tiberius competently initiated a scorched-earth policy which was unsatisfactory for Augustus, who sent more generals, including Germanicus and Plautius Silvanus (consul 2 BC) to the war theatre. A capitulation was forced out in 8 AD, and Bato the Breucian delivered Pinnes to the Romans, becoming a vassal king of his tribe. However, the revolt flared up once again as the Daesitiates captured and executed Bato the Breucian and persuaded his people to continue the resistance. Silvanus reconquered them and ousted Bato the Daesitiate into the Dinaric Alps, where he laid down arms in 9 AD.

== History ==
=== Consolidation and establishment of administration ===
Illyricum was divided into Dalmatia (initially called Illyricum Superius) and Pannonia (initially Illyricum Inferius) in 8 or 9 AD. (Note: It was not until the second part of the century that the term "Pannonia" came into common usage.)

According to Suetonius, with the Bellum Batonianum, Tiberius finally defeated all peoples between the Danube and the Adriatic Sea. No Illyrian resistance is known after this, not due to the natives' compliance with the new status quo, but due to their extreme exhaustion. The eligible Pannonian youth were conscripted and commanded to other provinces. The communities taking part in the uprising were afterward relocated and organized into civitates under military supervision. (Note: The Azali were moved northwards at this time.)

The military occupation of Pannonia may have been carried out in gradual steps. The Romans felt it necessary to resettle certain tribes to the territory of the peoples north of the Drava, which, for them, had no economic, but strategic significance. Augustus formed a kind of alliance where the Romans would act as supervisors, and it was not until his death (14 AD) that legions would be moved over from South Pannonia.

The second emperor Tiberius (r. 17 – 37 AD) founded multiple coloniae in the province and developed its road network. However, due to these land's unsuitability for cultivation, it was a hard task to persuade veterans to comply with settling there, and he had to silence a mutiny right when assuming power. He sent his son Drusus Julius Caesar to create tranquility and depose Maroboduus, who needed Roman support for his war against Arminius. This ultimately caused the rise of Vannius (20 AD), who ruled over an extended realm.

It was Claudius (r. 41 – 54 AD) who finished Pannonia's occupation and began to construct of the local limes. Systematic integration into the Empire accompanied by the establishment of settled Roman life progressed subsequently. In 50 AD, Vannius was overthrown by Vangio and Sido, who enjoyed the emperor's support. By this date, the nomadic Sarmatian population of the Iazyges had taken possession of the Danube–Tisza Interfluve, helping the Romans by being a buffer state against the dangerous Dacians.

At first, the primary goal of the Roman administration was the conclusion of the barbarian conflicts outside the province. In Nero's time (r. 54 – 68 AD) as many as 100,000 barbarians were moved from Pannonia to Moesia by Plautius Silvanus Aelianus, and 50,000 may have been settled in Pannonia by Tampius Flavianus. During his important governorship, money began to circulate in the Barbaricum and the line of the limes was stabilized.

=== Under the Flavians ===
The Year of the Four Emperors (69 AD) passed with peace in Pannonia. Flavianus declared for Vespasian and led his legions to Italy against Vitellius. Vespasian (r. 69 – 79 AD) invested greatly in the construction of the limes. Discarding the Augustan strategy where the legions' role was with maintaining order in their provinces, the Flavian emperors continually moved them to the border. This way they were prevented from interfering in domestic policy, while the conquests were already pacified. Systematic circulation of money in the region situated north of the Drava shows that by this time Roman civilization had firmly taken root there.

Domitian's (r. 81–96) emperorship saw expensive wars with the barbarians, as a result of which the military emphasis shifted to the Danube frontier. At the end of 85 or the beginning of 86, the reemerging Dacians under Decebalus raided Moesia, killing its governor and eradicating a legion. After a brief stay, Domitian left Cornelius Fuscus to deal with the situation. After clearing the province of raiders, Fuscus undertook a disastrous campaign and lost his life (86). Finally, in 88, Tettius Julianus defeated Decebalus and the sides agreed to make peace. Vangio and Sido were most likely dead by now, the Marcomanni and Quadi denied vassal duties. When the emperor's punitive expedition (partially sent through Dacian territory) was repelled in 89, he—despite the damages suffered—settled for mild terms with Decebalus, instead committing his forces elsewhere. In the same year, he held his triumphs over the Dacians and Chatti, but not over the disloyal Danubian Germans. When the Romans started supporting the Lugii against them, they made a pact with the Iazyges. This produced another war, almost completely unknown except for another catastrophe and destruction of a legion at the hands of the nomads. In 92 or 93, he finished the war, but held only an ovation, indicating he probably had further plans in Pannonia.

=== Under the Antonines ===
We hear of war with the Danubian Germans again under Nerva (r. 96–98).

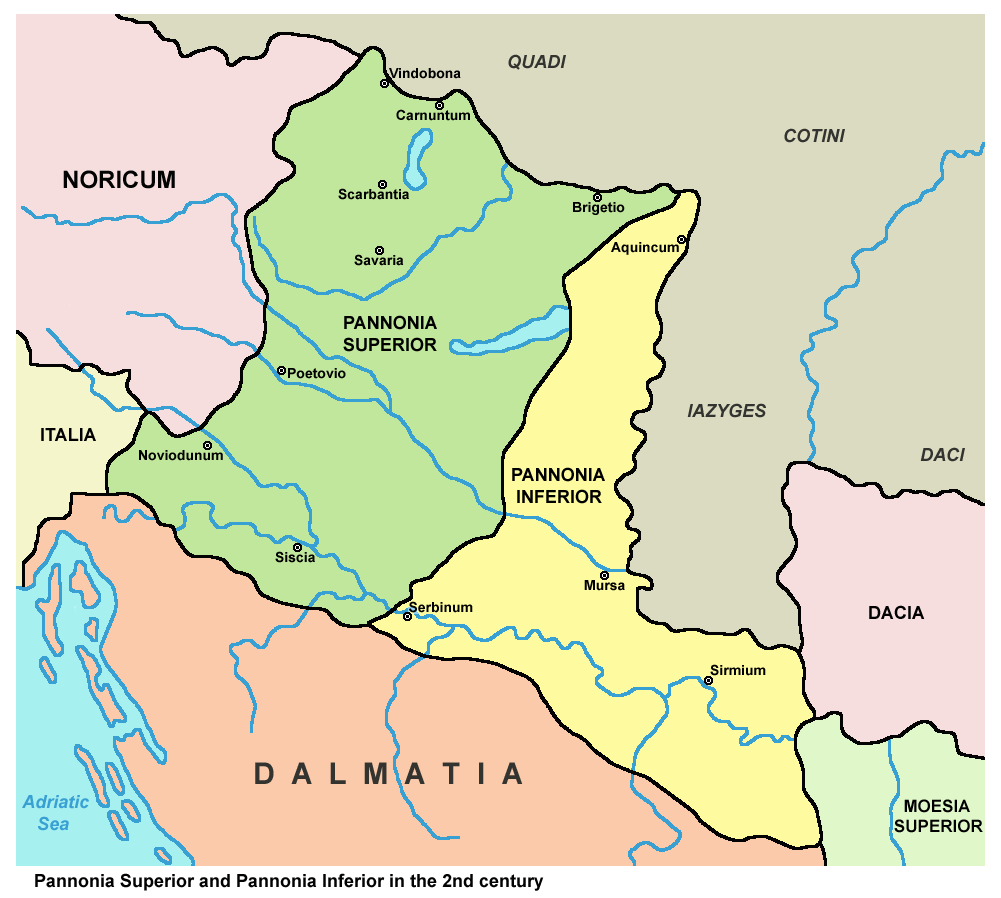
The divided Pannonia in the second century AD

Between 103 and 107, Trajan (r. 98–117) executed the division of the province into Pannonia Inferior and Pannonia Superior. This allowed the Empire to better combat the radically different Germanic and Sarmatian tribes. While Superior had most urbanized areas and a shorter frontier with three legions, Inferior contained one municipium and one legion, virtually being a border zone. Under his reign, the placement of garrison and the main lines of commerce became permanent.

The creation of Roman Dacia had a great effect on Pannonia. In Trajan's Dacian Wars, the Iazyges allied with the Romans, seeking to retain Oltenia where they were expelled by Decebalus. A brief confrontation in 107 was resolved Hadrian, then-governor of Pannonia Inferior and it may have been agreed that the nomads would instead take possession of the region between the Tisza and the Apuseni Mountains, not incorporated into the new province. However, taking advantage of Trajan's death and the preoccupation of the Empire with the Parthian war, they joined forces with the relative Roxolani and attacked again in 117, to which Dacia's governor, Julius Quadratus Bassus fell victim. Hadrian (r. 117–138) traveled to the spot and invested Marcius Turbo as governor of both Dacia and Pannonia Inferior to defeat the barbarians. The Roxolani were pacified first. Turbo's authorization was over in 119 as Iazyx peace envoys appeared in Rome. The postal connection between the two provinces through the Danube–Tisza Interfluve—which aggravated relations with the Sarmatians—was completed.

War with the Quadi broke out again in the last years of Hadrian's reign, which his adopted son and joint governor of the Pannonian provinces, Aelius Caesar successfully handled until he died in 138. Command of Pannonia Superior was taken over by Haterius Nepos, who ended the war with a Roman victory, becoming the last person to be awarded with ornamenta triumphalia.

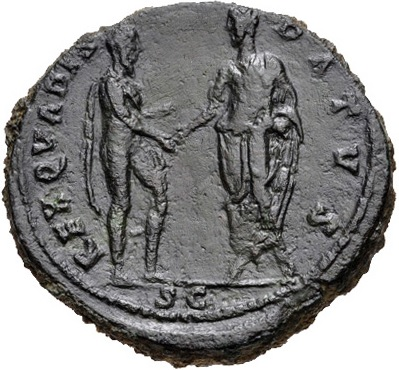
The coin of Pius (reverse), with the circumscription REX QUADIS DATUS

Under Antoninus Pius's (r. 138–161) quiet reign, some coins were issued propagating not the ending of a new campaign but the reestablishment of foederatus relationship by the investiture of a new Quadi king. Discharges and detachments of troops happened.

Findings of hoards of coins likely buried during the rule of Marcus Aurelius (r. 161–180) evidence turmoil due to barbarian attacks. Large-scale population movements in Northern and Eastern Europe related to the Goths highly endangered Rome's clients, who wanted the Empire to give its lands to settlement and extend its protection over the tribes. Rome was unwilling to grant these requests. The Romans may not have been aware of the dangerous situation at the start of the Parthian war of Lucius Verus because they sent a whole legion and many vexillationes away from Pannonia. It is thanks to the diplomatic efforts made by regional governors that tensions were eased until the dispatched forces could get back. When the threat became fully clear, Marcus even raised new legions. The first attack came in the winter of 166–167, from the Lombards and Ubii, between Brigetio and Arrabona. It was quickly repulsed by two auxiliary units. Cassius Dio tells of a legation of 11 tribes led by the Marcomanni subsequently petitioning the governor of Pannonia Superior, Iallius Bassus to concede. This may have been the last attempt at making peace, as next, a barbarian coalition formed to fight Rome.

In 168, Marcus and Verus returned to Aquileia and set up their base there. The Marcomanni and Quadi broke through the border and the Alps' crosses, besieging the city and burning the small town of Opitergium. The peak of the Antonine Plague in the peninsula was at this time, causing Verus's death. The next years' heavy fighting resulted in the death of governor of Moesia Superior and Dacia Claudius Fronto and praetorian prefect Macrinius Vindex. Claudius Pompeianus and future-emperor Pertinax returned part of the spoils taken by the enemy and led the offensive starting from 172. Against severe losses, the Romans forced first the Quadi, then the Marcomanni to surrender (172–173), while the military emphasis shifted to the Iazyges. Although the winter incursion of the Iazyges was crushed (173-174), the Quadi overthrew their Roman-installed king and started to support the nomads. While the two nations tried to negotiate, Marcus eventually defeated both of them in separate campaigns.

The second phase of the war started in 177. The attacking barbarians were kept in check, with Marcus and his son, the newly acclaimed Commodus (r. 177–192) coming to Pannonia. A decisive campaign by Tarrutenius Paternus in 179 convinced the Iazyges to make peace. In the same year, the land of the Danubian Germans was occupied by a force Cassius Dio claims to be 40,000 men—the number of soldiers stationed in Pannonia Inferior and Pannonia Superior combined. Control over tribes was taken over by prefects. Valerius Maximianus, born in Pannonia, was an important general here. Any possible plans with the creation of two new provinces—Marcomannia and Sarmatia—were aborted after the death of Marcus in 180. Commodus returned to the old border and client system, to which new residents were seemingly willing to join. As the barbarians pillaged during the war, taking cattle and captives away en masse, the destruction and loss of life in Pannonia was huge.

Commodus vigorously started to strengthen the limes with new fortifications. Minor raids on the province continued to occur, prompting a third campaign over the Danube at about. This campaign was smaller, and its leader, Tigidius Perennis, achieved a victory. Another victorious expedition was conducted in 188.

=== Under the Severans ===
During the Year of the Five Emperors (193), no attack was made on Pannonia. According to Herodian, Septimius Severus (r. 193–211) calmed the barbarian tribes via negotiations before marching off his troops to Italy and gaining the throne. In the coming years, the arrival of foreign groups led to new conflicts, but these were centered on Dacia and Pannonia only experienced collateral effects. The Severans' rule was supported by the Pannonian military and other provinces of the collective "Illyricum" region, which became politically important. In 202, a thorough visit to Pannonia by the imperial house was organized. Partly during this tour and throughout Severus' reign, the province benefited from many constructions. The road network was fully repaired, civilian and military buildings were inaugurated, military camps were improved and cities were protected with walls thus increasing their rank.

=== Administration ===
Pannonia Superior was under the consular legate, who had formerly administered the single province, and had three legions under his control. Pannonia Inferior was at first under a praetorian legate with a single legion as the garrison; after Marcus Aurelius, it was under a consular legate, but still with only one legion. The frontier on the Danube was protected by the establishment of the two colonies Aelia Mursia and Aelia Aquincum by Hadrian.

Under Diocletian and his successors, a fourfold division of the country was made:

- Pannonia Prima in the northwest, with its capital in Savaria, it included Pannonia Superior and the major part of Central Pannonia between the Raba and Drava,
- Pannonia Valeria in the northeast, with its capital in Sopianae, it comprised the remainder of Central Pannonia between the Raba, Drava and Danube,
- Pannonia Savia in the southwest, with its capital in Siscia,
- Pannonia Secunda in the southeast, with its capital in Sirmium

Diocletian also moved parts of today's Slovenia out of Pannonia and incorporated them in Noricum. In 324 AD, Constantine I enlarged the borders of Roman Pannonia to the east, annexing the plains of what is now eastern Hungary, northern Serbia and western Romania up to the limes that he created: the Devil's Dykes.

In the 4th–5th century, one of the dioceses of the Roman Empire was known as the Diocese of Pannonia. It had its capital in Sirmium and included all four provinces that were formed from historical Pannonia, as well as the provinces of Dalmatia, Noricum Mediterraneum and Noricum Ripense.

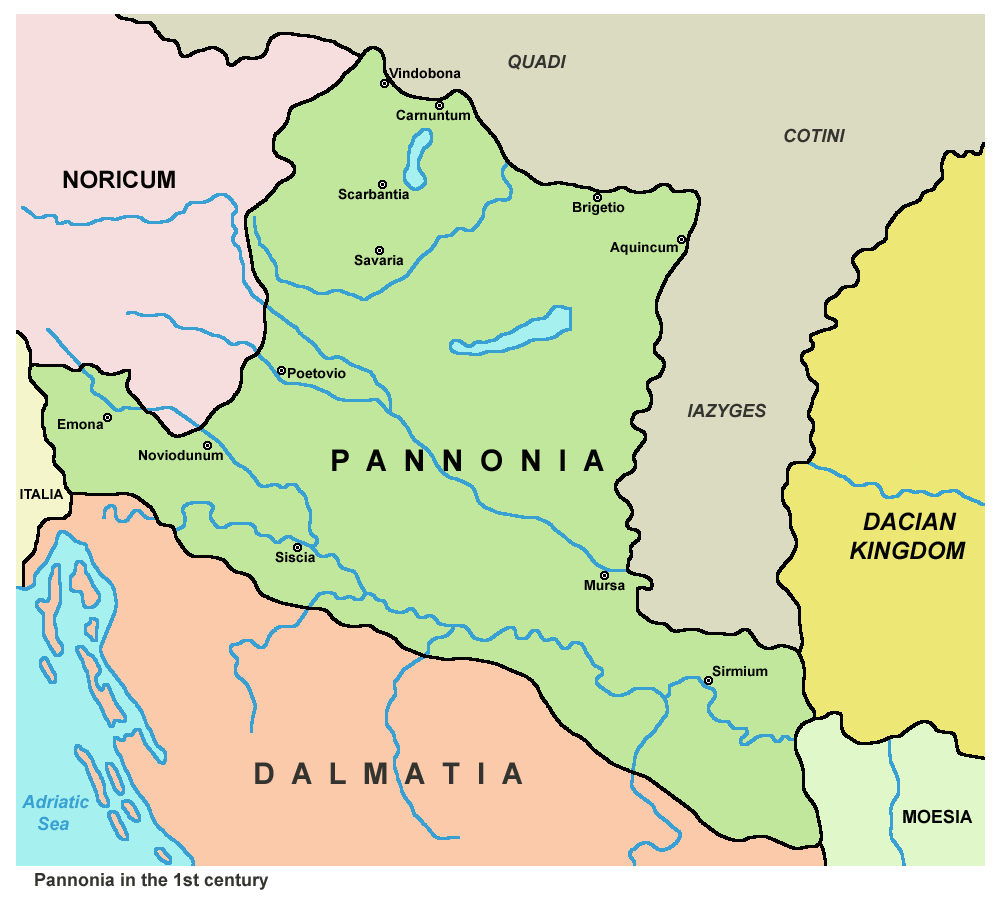
Pannonia in the 1st century

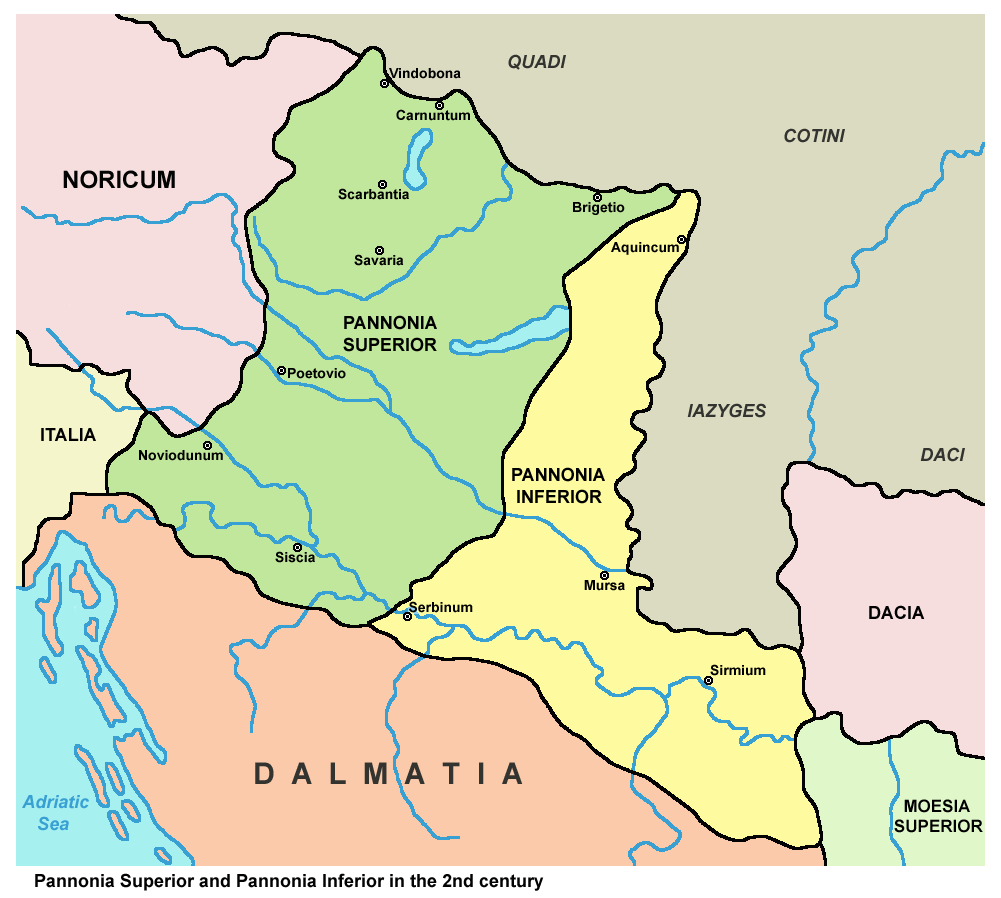
Pannonia in the 2nd century

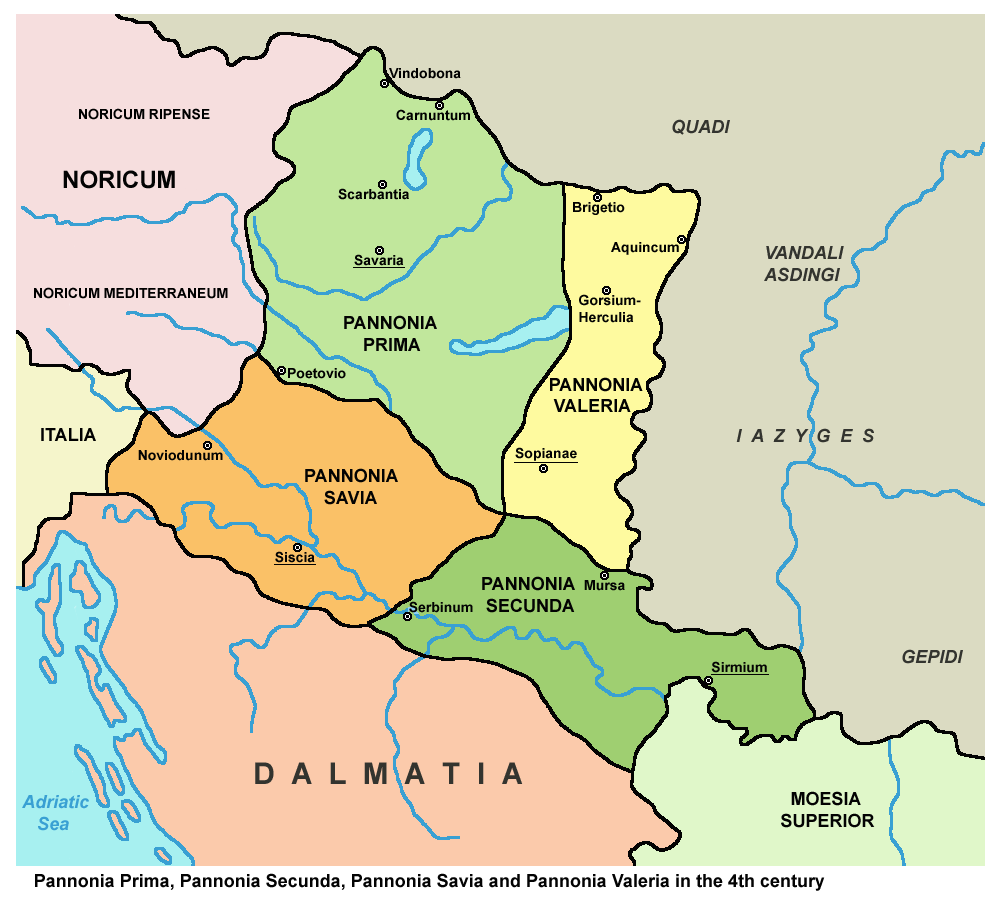
Pannonia in the 4th century

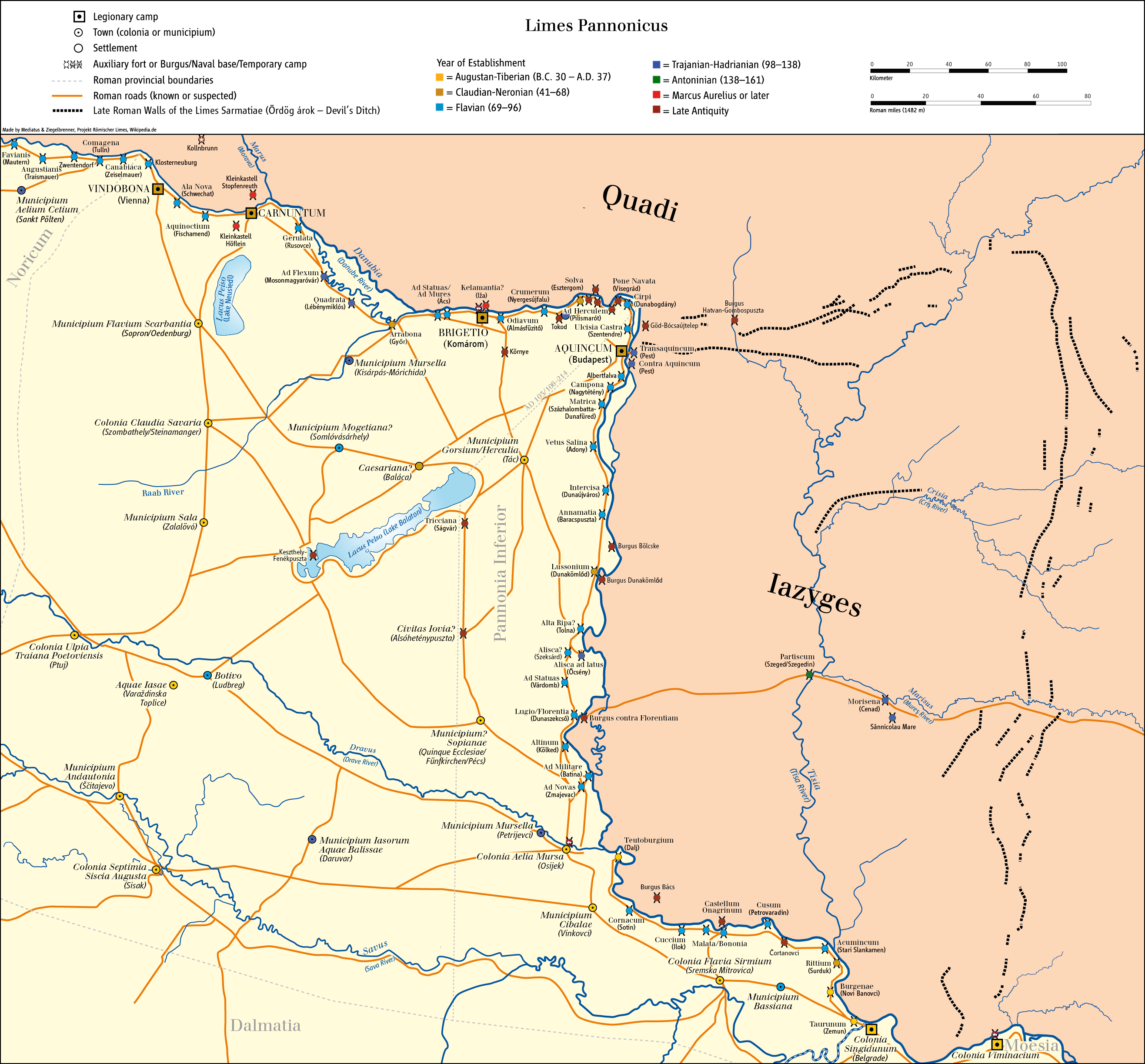
Pannonia with Constantine I "limes" in 330 AD

=== Loss ===
In the 4th century, the Romans (especially under Valentinian I) fortified the villas and relocated barbarians to the border regions. In 358 they won a great victory over the Sarmatians, but raids did not stop. In 401 the Visigoths fled to the province from the Huns, and the border guarding peoples fled to Italia from them, but were beaten by Uldin in exchange for the transferring of Eastern Pannonia. In 433 Rome completely handed over the territory to Attila for the subjugation of the Burgundians attacking Gaul.

== After Roman rule ==
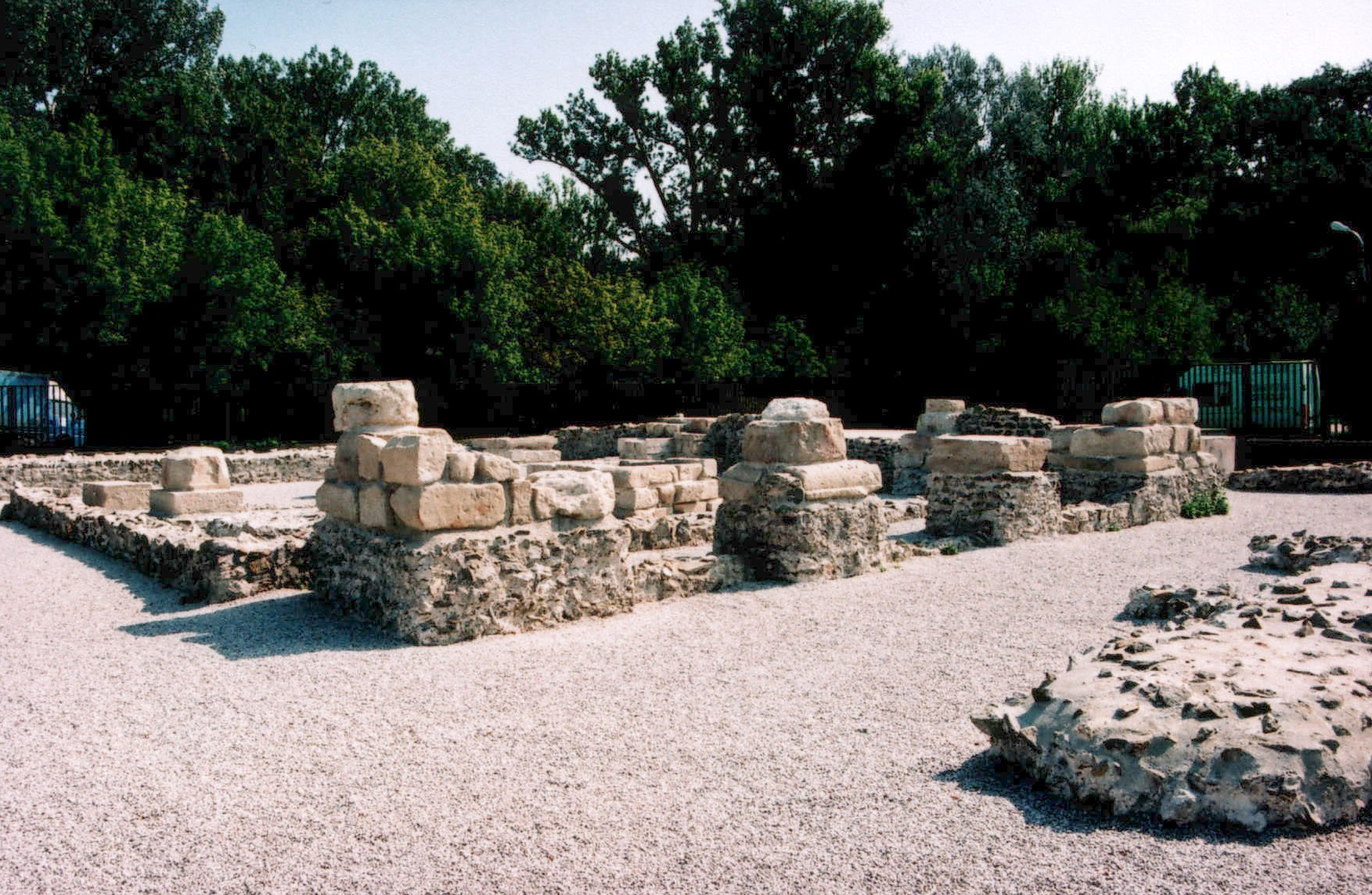
Gerulata, a Roman military camp located near today's Rusovce, Slovakia

During the Migration Period in the 5th century, some parts of Pannonia were ceded to the Huns in 433 by Flavius Aetius, the magister militum of the Western Roman Empire. After the collapse of the Hunnic empire in 454, large numbers of Ostrogoths were settled by Emperor Marcian in the province as foederati. The Eastern Roman Empire controlled southern parts of Pannonia in the 6th century, during the reign of Justinian I. The Byzantine province of Pannonia with its capital at Sirmium was temporarily restored, but it included only a small southeastern part of historical Pannonia.

Afterwards, it was again invaded by the Avars in the 560s, and by the Slavs, who may have first settled around the 480s but only became independent starting in the 7th century. In 790s, it was invaded by the Franks, who used the name "Pannonia" to designate the newly formed frontier province, the March of Pannonia. The term Pannonia was also used for the Slavic polity of Lower Pannonia, which was vassal to the Frankish Empire.

Through Roman influence, a dialect of Latin now called Pannonian Latin developed in the region; the several major political shifts would see it go extinct around the 6th century.

== Cities and auxiliary forts ==
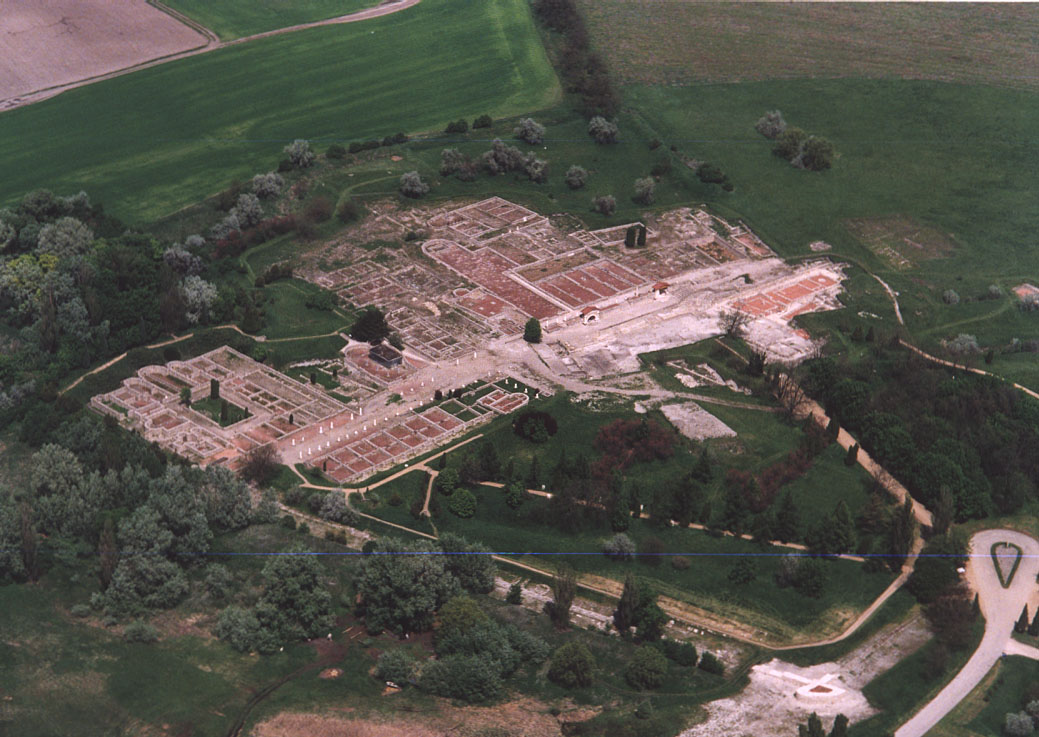
Aerial photography: Gorsium - Tác - Hungary

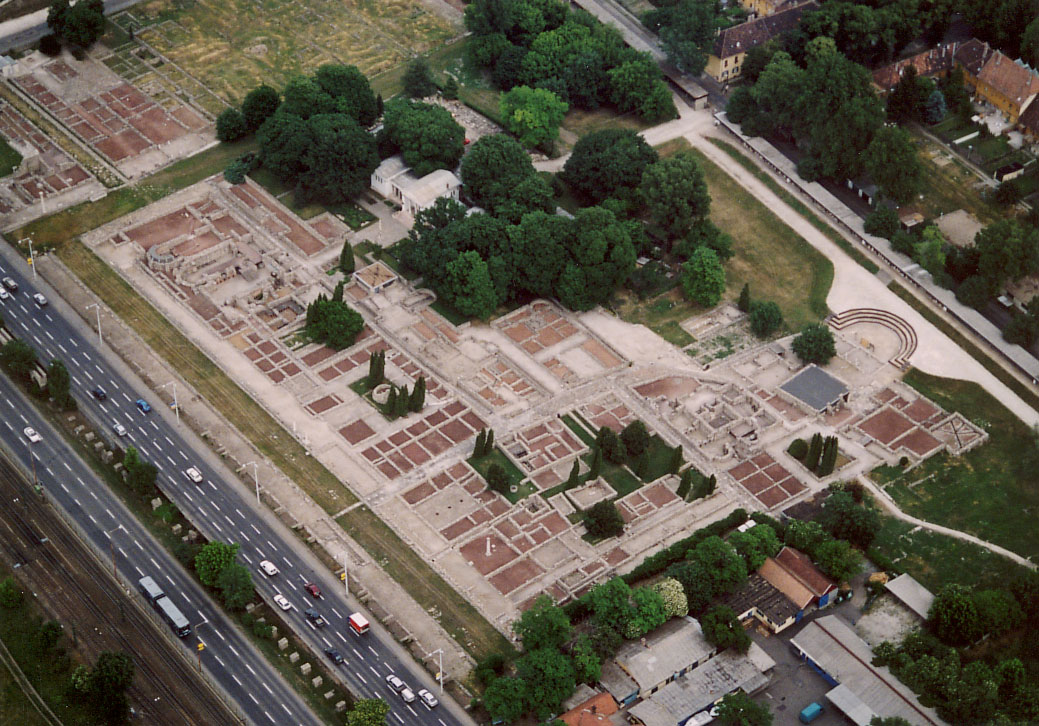
Aquincum, Hungary

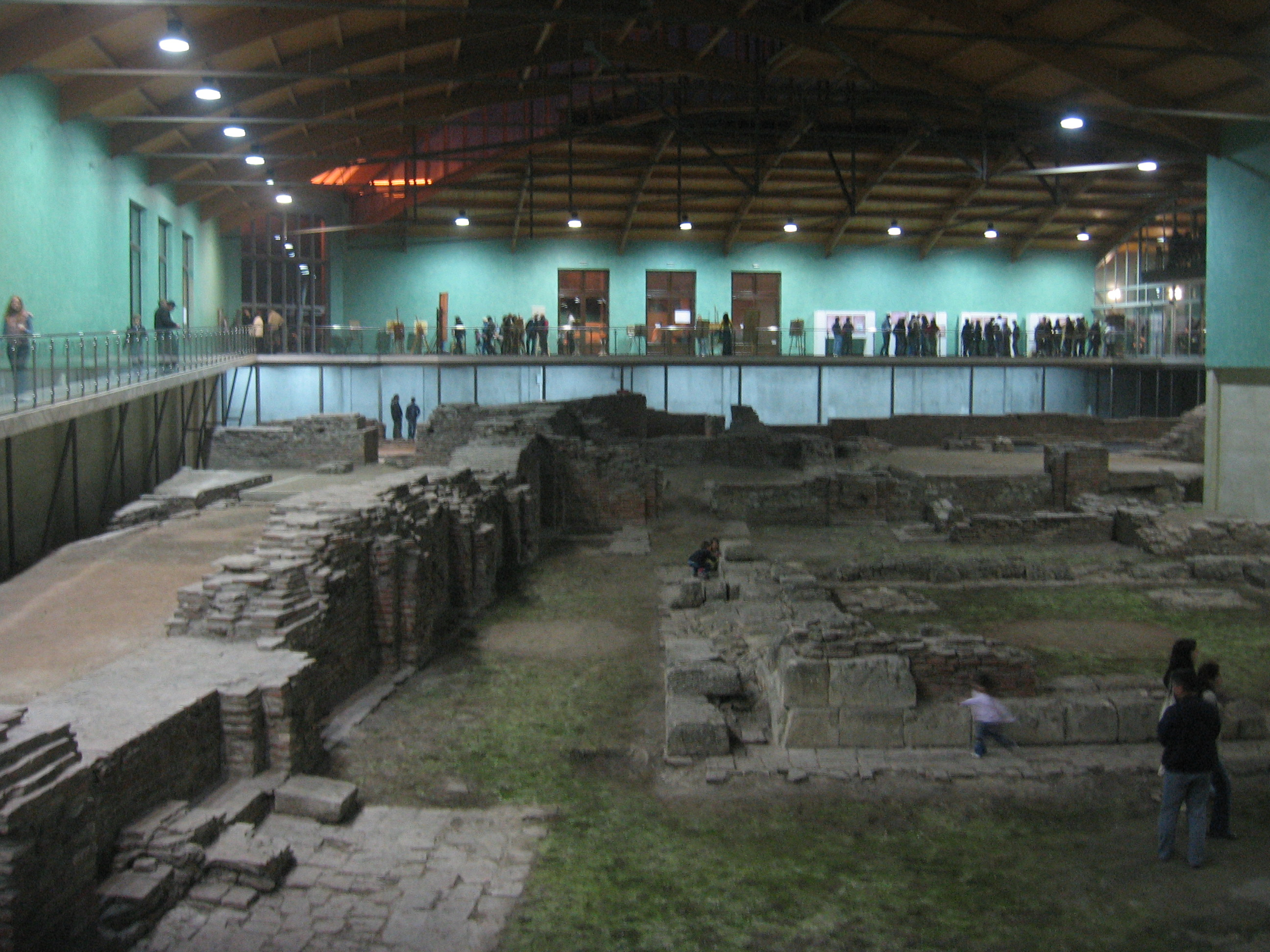
Ruins of Imperial Palace in Sirmium

The native settlements consisted of pagi (cantons) containing a number of vici (villages), the majority of the large towns being of Roman origin. The cities and towns in Pannonia were:

Now in Austria:

- Carnuntum (Petronell, Bad Deutsch-Altenburg)
- Vindobona (Vienna)

Now in Bosnia and Herzegovina:

- Saldae (Brčko)
- Serbinum or Servitium (Gradiška)
- Castrum and Canabea (Doboj)

Now in Croatia:

- Ad Novas (Zmajevac)
- Andautonia (Ščitarjevo)
- Aqua Viva (Petrijanec)
- Aquae Balisae (Daruvar)
- Certissa (Đakovo)
- Cibalae (Vinkovci)
- Cornacum (Sotin)
- Cuccium (Ilok)
- Halicanum (Sveti Martin na Muri)
- Iovia or Iovia Botivo (Ludbreg)
- Marsonia (Slavonski Brod)
- Mursa (Osijek)
- Siscia (Sisak)
- Teutoburgium (Dalj)

Now in Hungary:

- Ad Flexum (Mosonmagyaróvár)
- Ad Mures (Ács)
- Ad Statuas (Vaspuszta)
- Ad Statuas (Várdomb)
- Alisca (Szekszárd)
- Alta Ripa (Tolna)
- Aquincum (Óbuda, Budapest)
- Arrabona (Győr)
- Brigetio (Szőny)
- Caesariana (Baláca)
- Campona (Nagytétény)
- Cirpi (Dunabogdány)
- Contra-Aquincum (Budapest)
- Contra Constantiam (Dunakeszi)
- Gorsium-Herculia (Tác)
- Intercisa (Dunaújváros)
- Iovia (Szakcs)
- Lugio (Dunaszekcső)
- Lussonium (Dunakömlőd)
- Matrica (Százhalombatta)
- Morgentianae (Tüskevár (?))
- Mursella (Mórichida)
- Quadrata (Lébény)
- Sala (Zalalövő)
- Savaria (Szombathely)
- Scarbantia (Sopron)
- Solva (Esztergom)
- Sopianae (Pécs)
- Ulcisia Castra (Szentendre)
- Valcum (Fenékpuszta)

Now in Serbia:

- Acumincum (Stari Slankamen)
- Ad Herculae (Čortanovci)
- Bassianae (Donji Petrovci)
- Bononia (Banoštor)
- Burgenae (Novi Banovci)
- Cusum (Petrovaradin)
- Graio (Sremska Rača)
- Onagrinum (Begeč)
- Rittium (Surduk)
- Sirmium (Sremska Mitrovica)
- Taurunum (Zemun)

Now in Slovakia:

- Gerulata (Rusovce)

Now in Slovenia:

- Celeia (Celje)
- Neviodunum (Drnovo)
- Poetovio (Ptuj)

== Economy ==
The country was fairly productive, especially after the great forests had been cleared by Probus and Galerius. Before that time, timber had been one of its most important exports. Its chief agricultural products were oats and barley, from which the inhabitants brewed a kind of beer named sabaea. Vines and olive trees were little cultivated. Pannonia was also famous for its breed of hunting dogs. Although no mention is made of its mineral wealth by the ancients, it is probable that it contained iron and silver mines.

=== Slavery ===
Slavery held a less important role in Pannonia's economy than in earlier established provinces. Rich civilians had domestic slaves do the housework while soldiers who had been awarded with land had their slaves cultivate it. Slaves worked in workshops primarily in western cities for rich industrialist. In Aquincum, they were freed in a short time.

== Religion ==
Pannonia had sanctuaries for Jupiter, Juno and Minerva, official deities of empire, and also for old Celtic deities. In Aquincum there was one for the mother goddess. The imperial cult was also present. In addition, Judaism and eastern mystery cults also appeared, the latter centered around Mithra, Isis, Anubis and Serapis.

Christianity began to spread inside the province in the 2nd century. Its popularity did not decrease even during the big persecutions in the late 3rd century. In the 4th century, basilicas and funeral chapels were built. We know of the Church of Saint Quirinus in Savaria and numerous early Christian memorials from Aquincum, Sopianae, Fenékpuszta, and Arian Christian ones from Csopak.

== Legacy ==
The ancient name Pannonia is retained in the modern term Pannonian plain.

== See also ==
- Pannonian plain
- Roman provinces
- Diocese of Pannonia
- Pannonian Latin

== Sources ==
- Borhy, László (2014). Die Römer in Ungarn. Darmstadt: Wissenschaftliche Buchgesellschaft. ISBN 978-3-8053-4820-1.
- Lengyel, Alfonz; Radan, George T., eds. (1980). The archaeology of Roman Pannonia (PDF). Lexington, Budapest: University Press of Kentucky, Akadémiai Kiadó. ISBN 0-8131-1370-9.
  - Trogmayer, Ottó. "Pannonia before the Roman conquest". In Lengyel & Radan (1980).
  - Barkóczi, László. "History of Pannonia". In Lengyel & Radan (1980).
- Mócsy, András (1974a). Harmatta, János (ed.). Pannónia a korai császárság idején [Pannonia during the Early Empire] (PDF). Budapest: Akadémiai Kiadó. ISBN 963-05-0293-3.
- Mócsy, András (1974b). Harmatta, János (ed.). Pannónia a késői császárkorban [Pannonia during the Later Empire] (PDF). Budapest: Akadémiai Kiadó. ISBN 963-05-0293-3.
- Benda, Kálmán; Solymosi, László, eds. (1983). Magyarország történeti kronológiája [Historical chronology of Hungary] (PDF). Vol. 1. A kezdetektől 1526-ig. Budapest: Akadémiai Kiadó. ISBN 963-05-3182-8.
  - Kovács, Tibor. "őskőkor-vaskor". In Benda & Solymosi (1983).
  - Tóth, István. "római kor". In Benda & Solymosi (1983).
- Wilkes, John (1992). The Illyrians (1st ed.). Bodmin: Blackwell Publishing. ISBN 0-631-14671-7.
- Elekes, Lajos; Lederer, Emma; Székely, György (1961). Magyarország története [History of Hungary] (PDF). Vol. I. Budapest: Tankönyvkiadó.
- Fitz, Jenő (1993–1995). Die Verwaltung Pannoniens in der Römerzeit (four volumes). Budapest: Encyclopedia.
- Petruska, Magdolna (1983). "A Danuvius partján" [On the shore of the Danuvius]. In Gyulás, Istvánné (ed.). Az antik Róma napjai [The days of ancient Rome]. Tankönyvkiadó.
