= Church of St. Mark the Evangelist, Zagreb =

Church of St. Mark the Evangelist (Croatian: Župna crkva sv. Marka evanđelista)
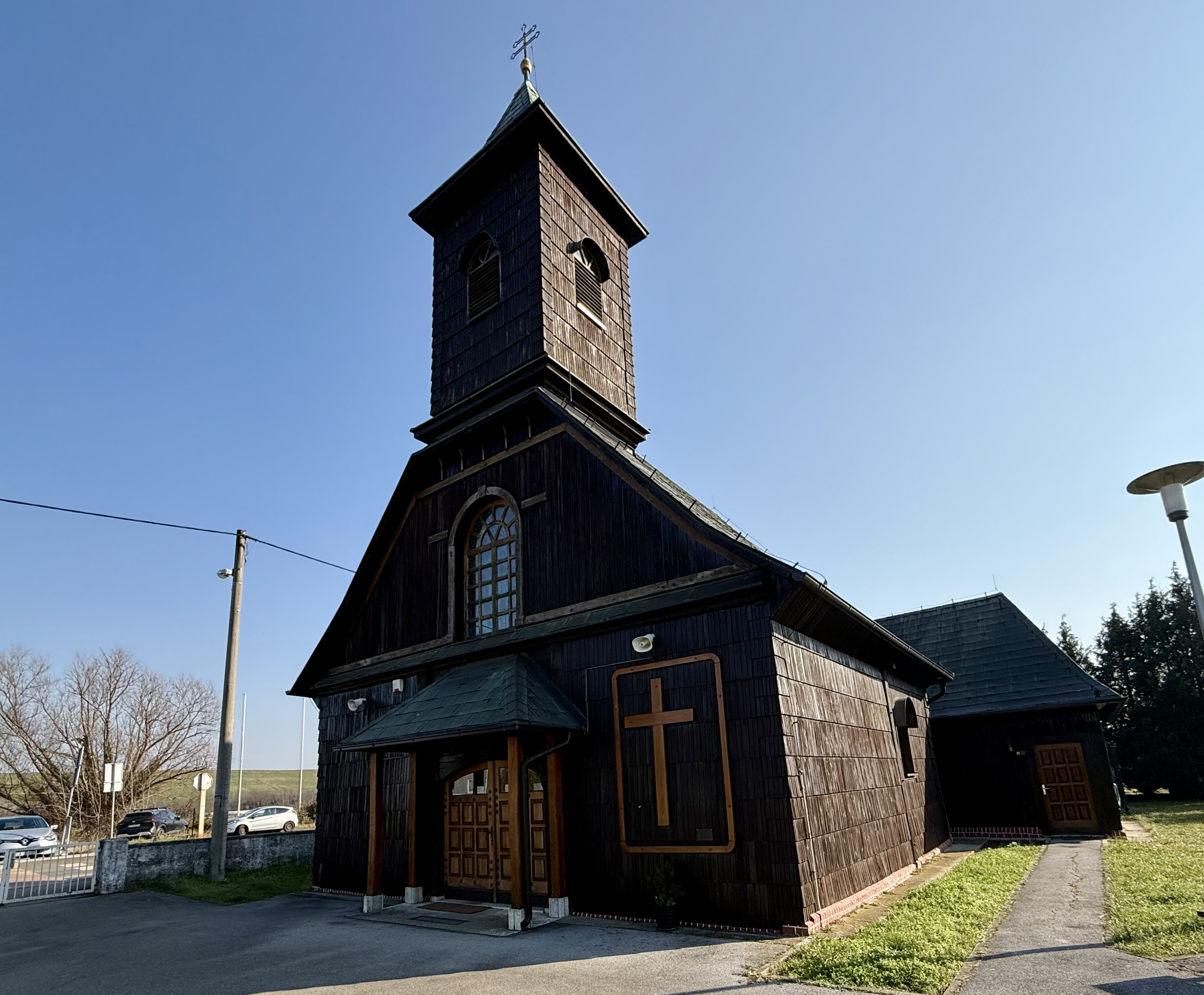
- Church in 2025
- Church of St. Mark the Evangelist (Croatian: Župna crkva sv. Marka evanđelista)
- 45°45′30″N 16°01′13″E
- Location: Zagreb
- Country: Croatia
- Denomination: Roman Catholic

Architecture
- Functional status: Active
- Architectural type: post-baroque
- Completed: 1832

Church of St. Mark the Evangelist (Croatian: Župna crkva sv. Marka evanđelista u Zagrebu) is a Catholic parish church located in the neighbourhood Jakuševec of Zagreb, Croatia. The church was built in 1832.

== History ==
Church of Saint Mark the Evangelist is one of the first post-Baroque wooden churches outside the area of the Noble Municipality of Turopolje, located within the Turopolje ecclesiastical archdeaconry.

== Architecture ==
The church is characterized by a wide nave and a narrow, relatively long sanctuary with a three-sided apse, while the sacristy is attached to the southern wall of the sanctuary. The foundations and floor of the church are made of brick.

The exterior of the church is defined by a tower, a gable and vertically clad walls with wooden panelling and narrow battens. This intervention was carried out during the renovation of 1856, when the interior was plastered. This intervention represented a transition towards the imitation of masonry architecture which was considered more elegant.

The church vault is shaped in a barrel-vaulted style, which gives the interior a pronounced baroque character. The roof is built with a gable, the so-called "head", on which the "cornel" and attic windows are placed, one above the other. At the bottom of the gable is the attic, which serves to protect the lower part of the facade from precipitation.

The main entrance of the church consists of wide church doors with wooden jambs, which have a base and a capital. Above the entrance is a segmental lintel. This style of facade design, with a free gable zone, represents an important innovation in the architecture of wooden churches in Turopolje and later became their typological characteristic.

== Artwork ==
Next to the altarpiece of St. Mark on the right side of the apse is a Baroque painting of Saint Roch, restored in the 1980s. Beneath the present-day sacristy are preserved stone foundations of the former chapel of St. Roch, which are assumed to have been transferred from the ancient Roman Andautonia (today's Šćitarjevo) during its construction.

== Gallery ==
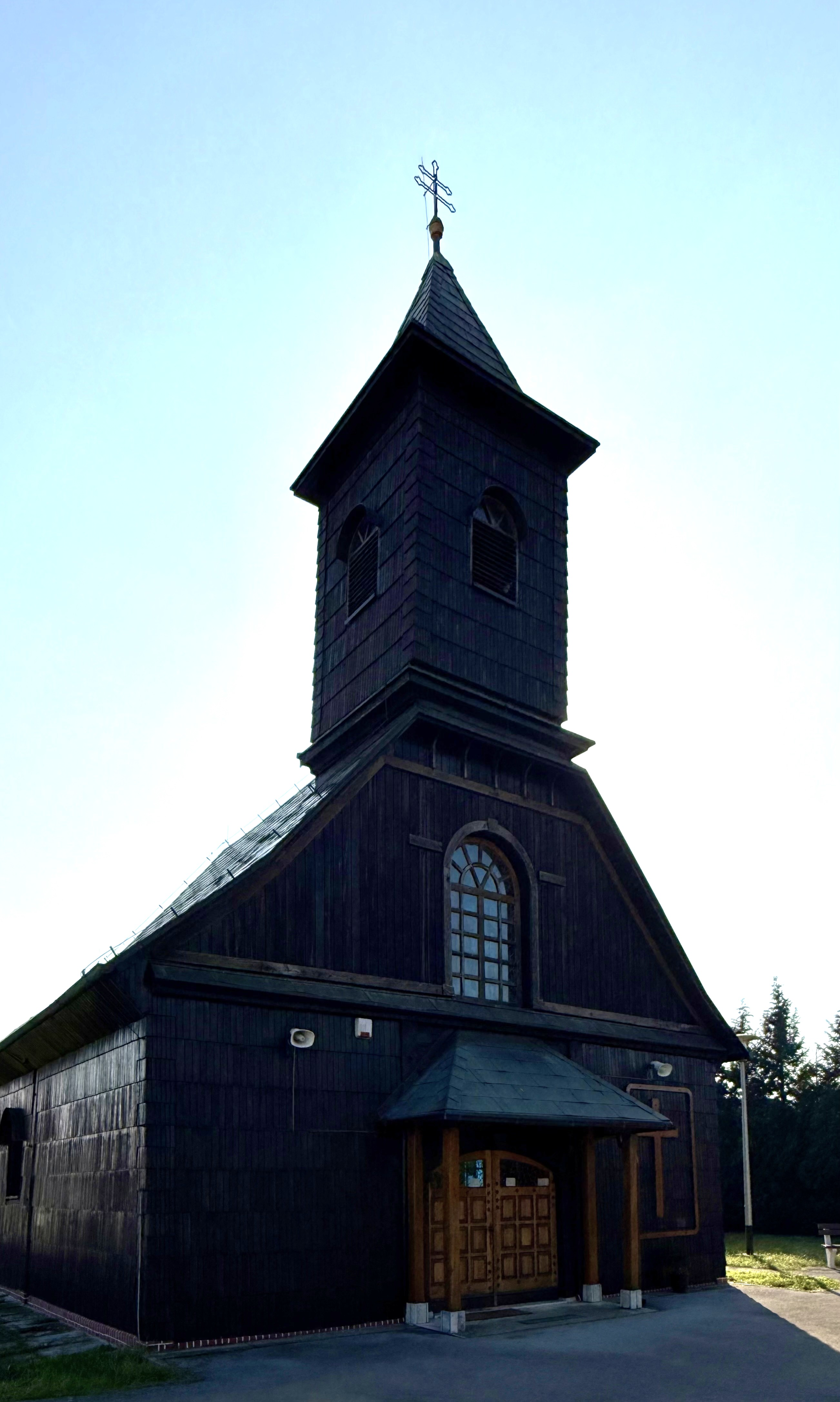
View of the church

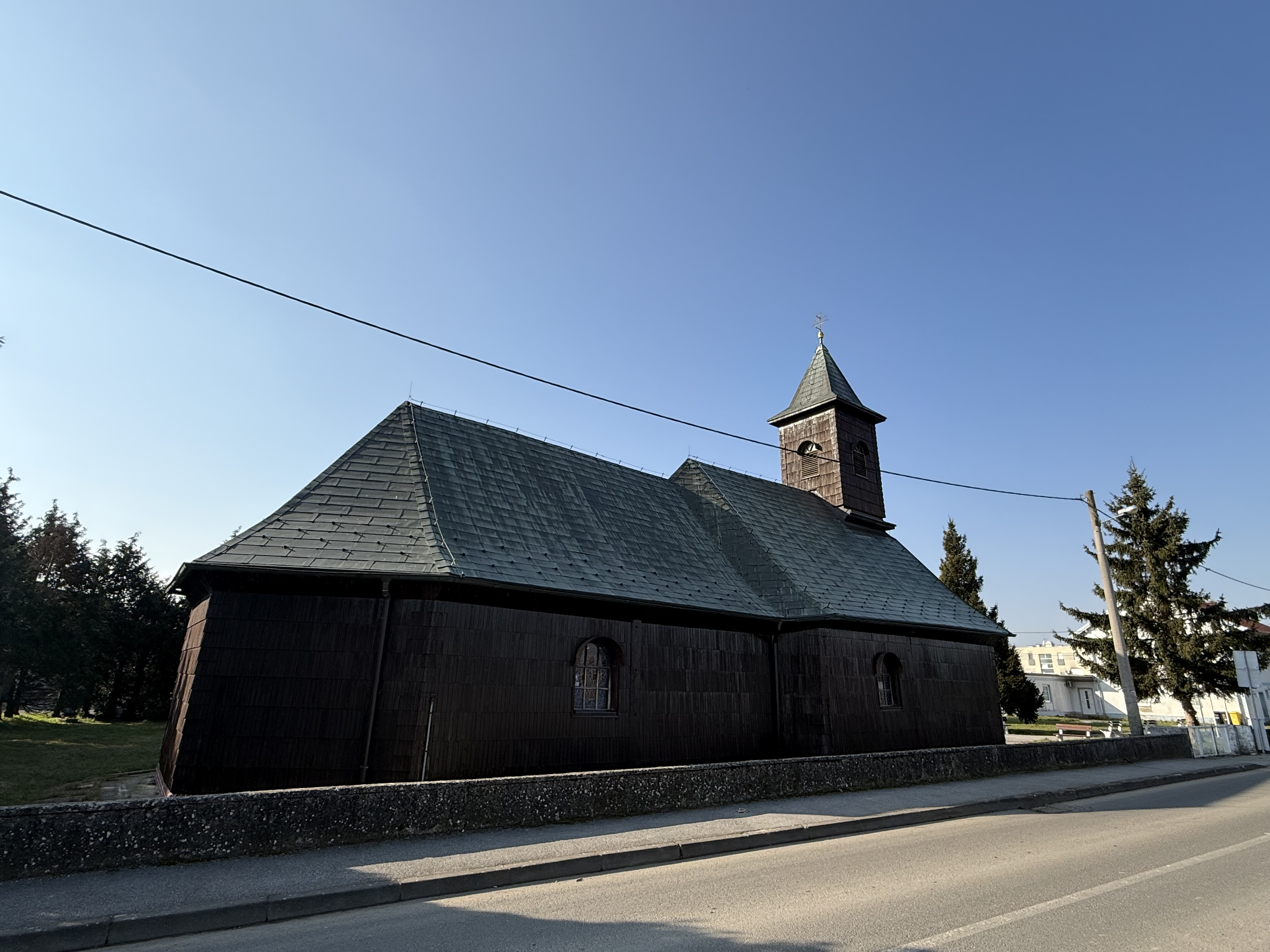
View of the church from the street

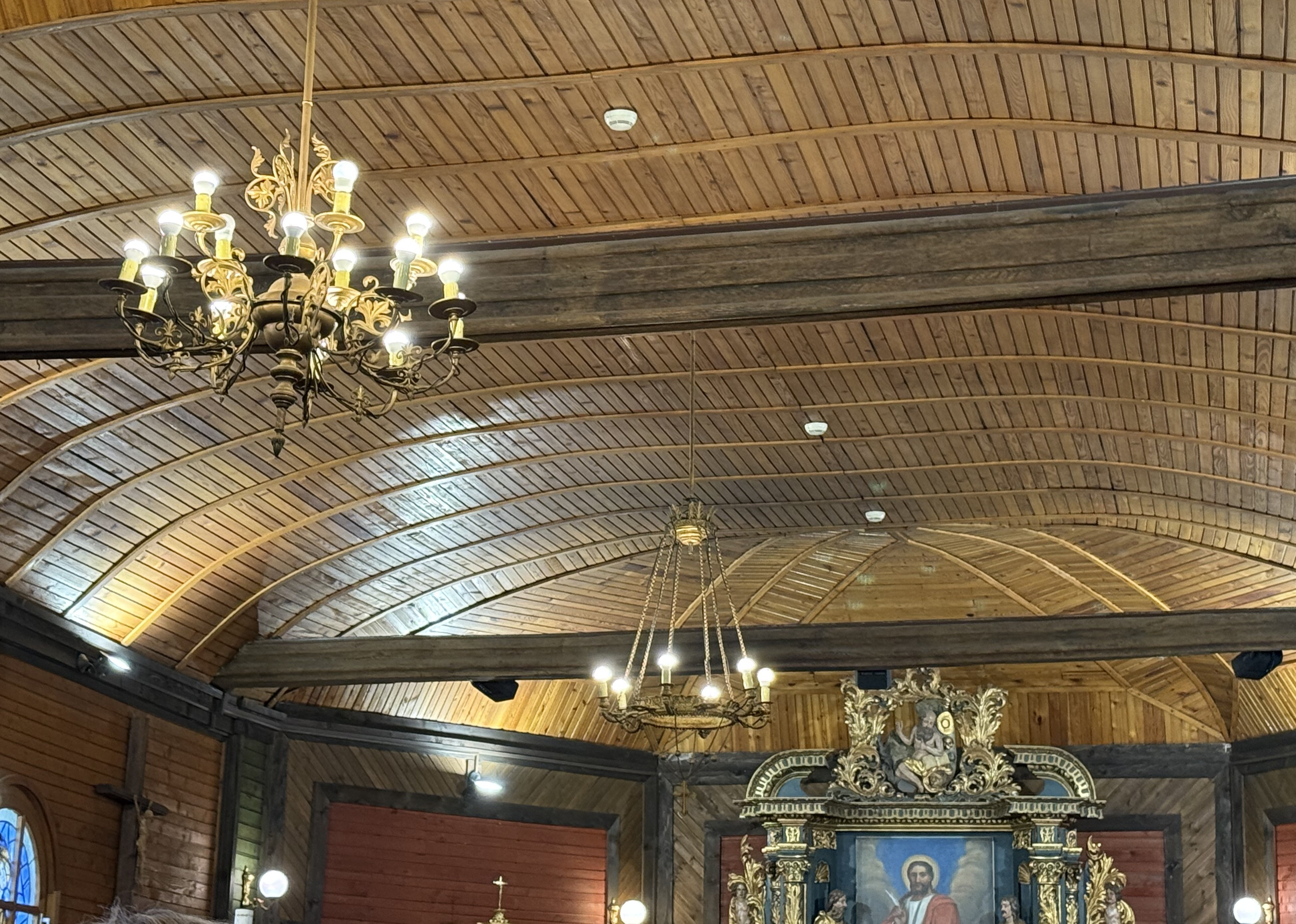
Barrel-style vault

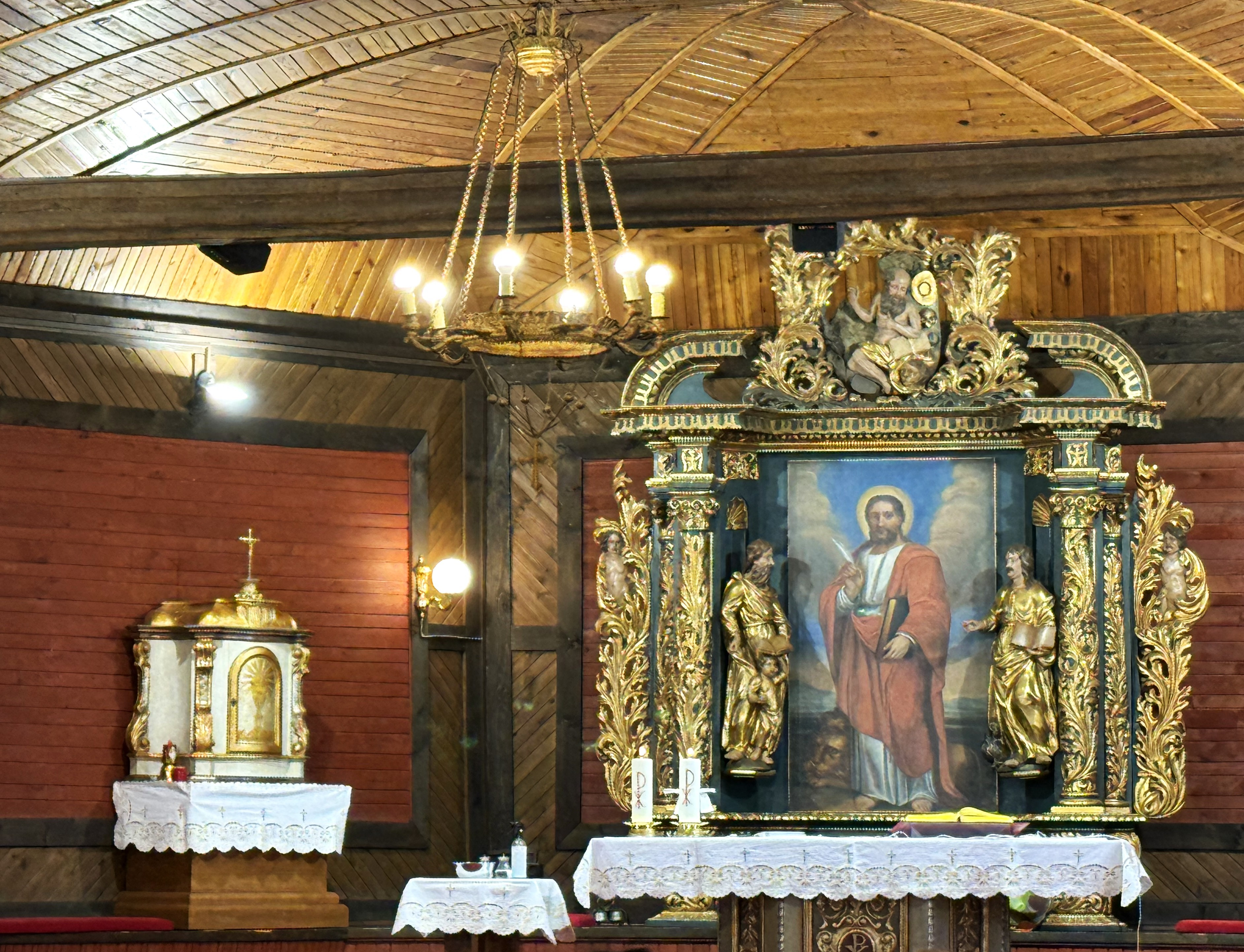
Altar and painting of St. Mark

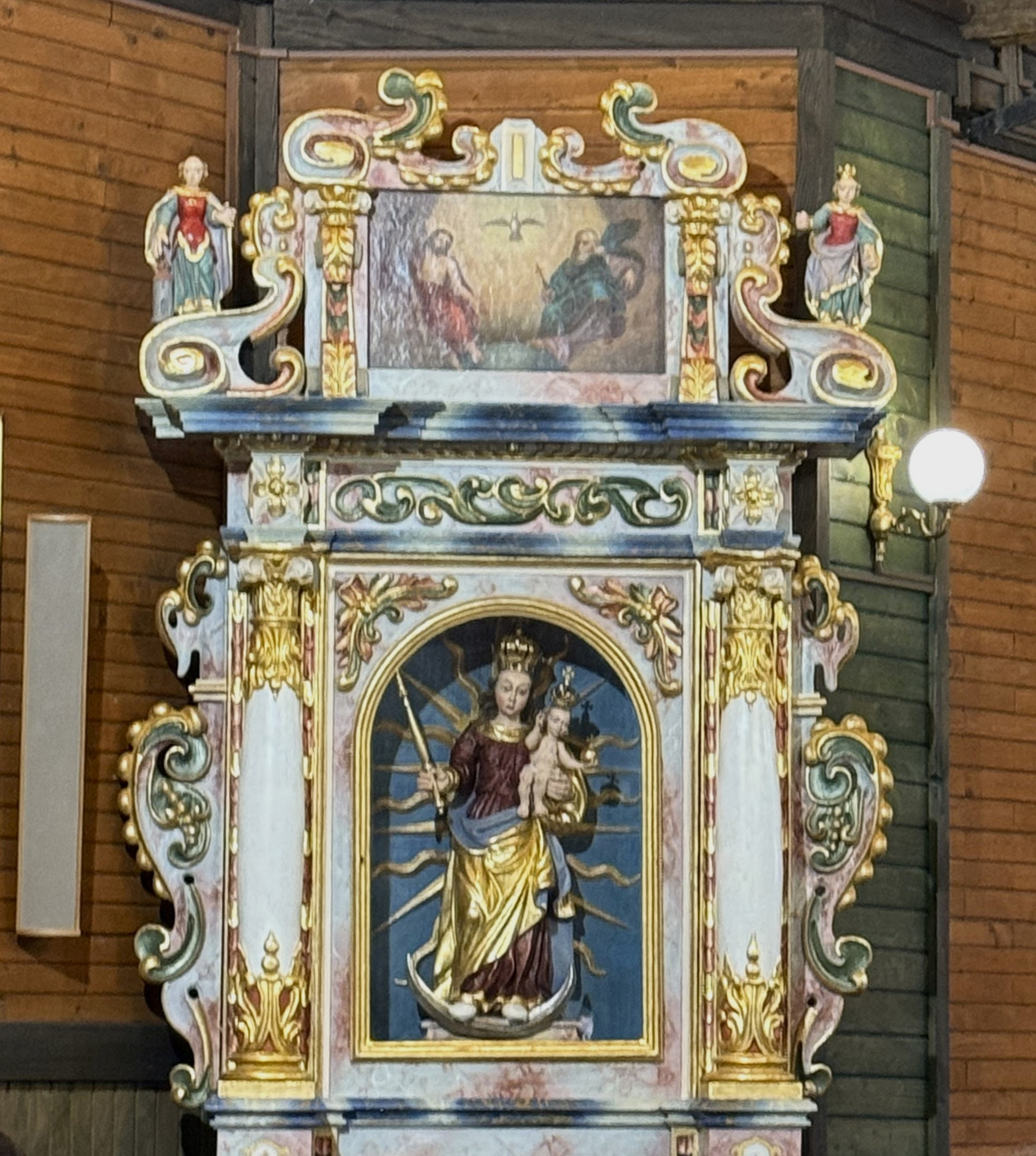
Image of the Virgin Mary

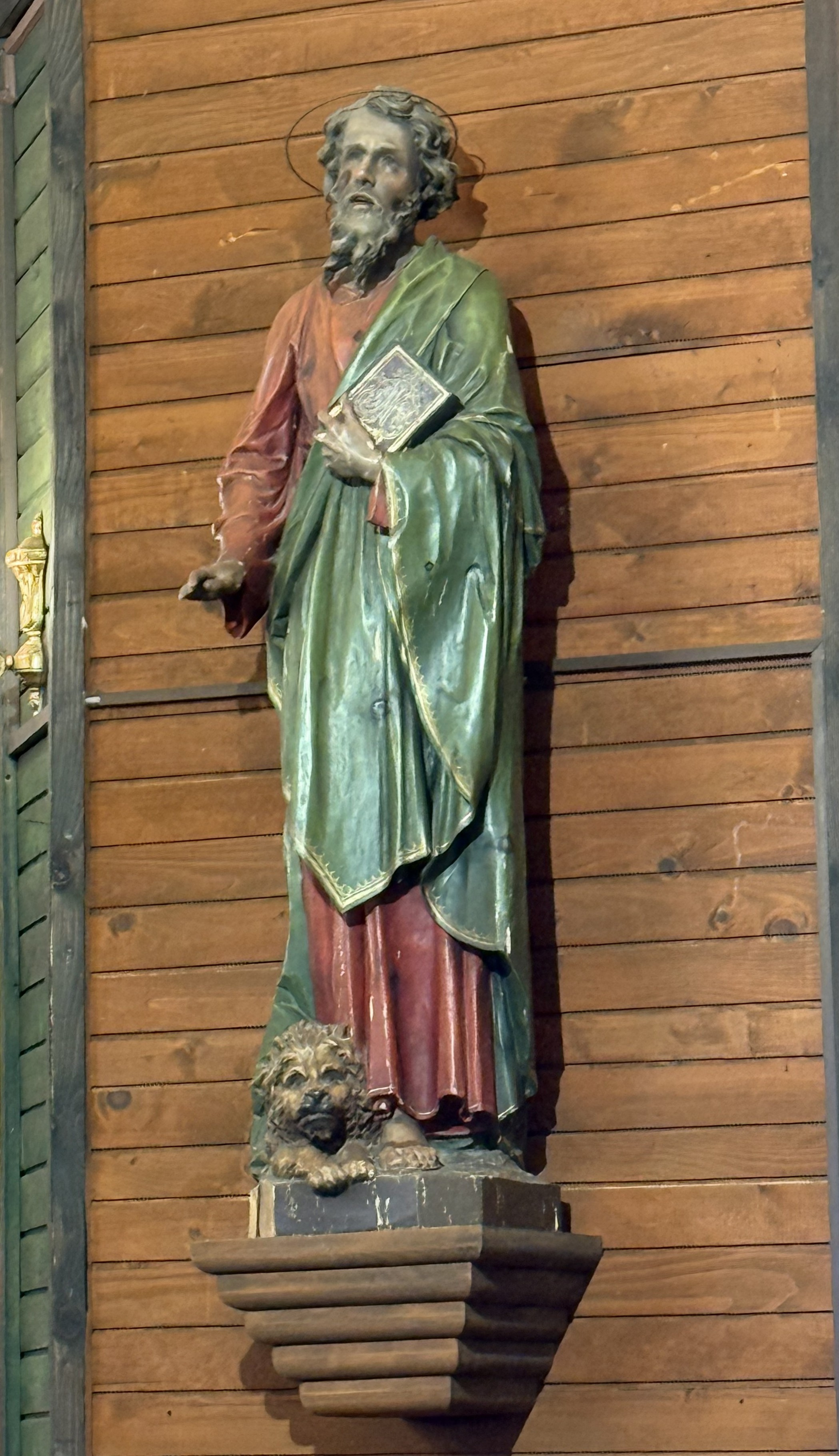
Statue of St. Roch
