= Ad Statuas =

Ad Statuas may refer to:

- Ad Statuas (Thrace), in ancient Thrace, in present-day Turkey
- Mogente, in present-day Spain
- San Cesareo, in present-day Italy
- Vaspuszta, in present-day Hungary
- Várdomb, in present-day Hungary
