= Strmec Podravski =

- Location within Croatia
- Coordinates: 46°22′N 16°13′E
- Country: Croatia
- County: Varaždin
- Municipality: Petrijanec

Area
  - Total: 7.7 km^{2} (3.0 sq mi)

Population (2021)
  - Total: 563
  - Density: 73/km^{2} (190/sq mi)
- Time zone: UTC+1 (CET)
  - Summer (DST): UTC+2 (CEST)

Strmec Podravski is a village in the municipality of Petrijanec, of Varaždin County, Croatia. The village had 663 inhabitants in the 2011 census.
