= Serbinum =

Ancient Roman city in Pannonia

Coordinates: 45°08′45″N 17°15′14″E

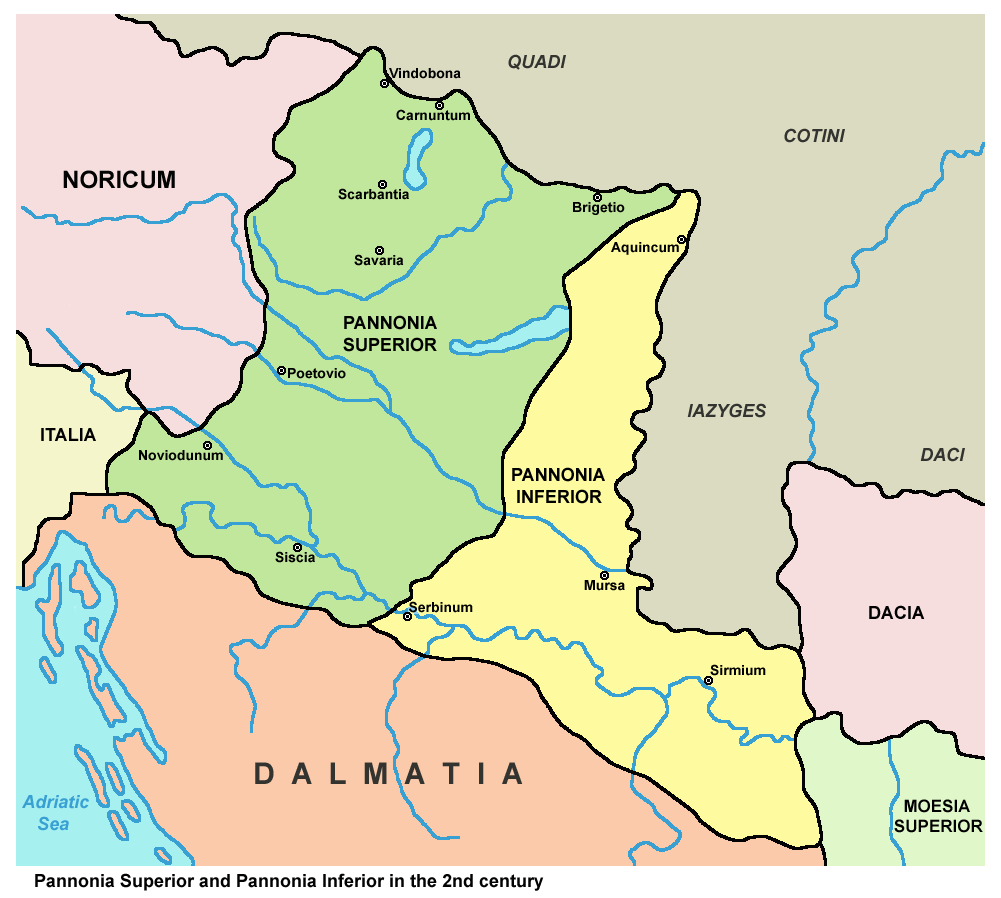
Serbinum in Pannonia in the 2nd century

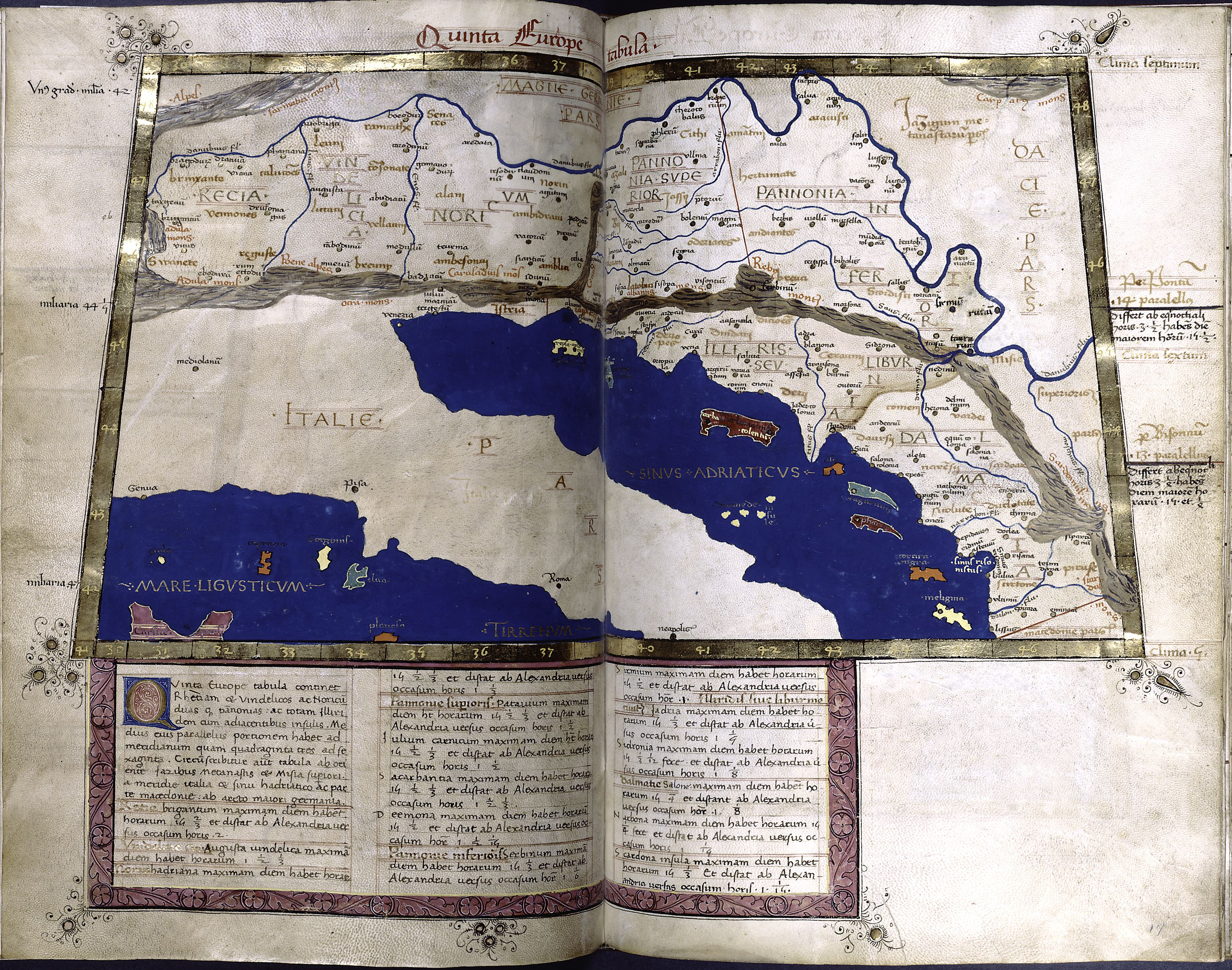
Ferbinu (Servitium) on Ptolemaic map

Serbinum, also known as Serbitium or Serbicium, was an ancient Roman city in the province of Pannonia. It was situated in what is now Gradiška in the northern Bosnia and Herzegovina.

== Sources ==
- In Ptolemy’s Geography from the 2nd century, there is mention of (and it is also indicated on a map) a place named Serbinon or Serbinum (This place was located under mountains Biblia ore or Biblini montes or Beby m. which are actually Kozara and Grmeč, according to Hungarian scientists).
- In the Antonine Itinerary from the 2nd and 3rd centuries, this name is written as Servitium.
- In the Tabula Peutingeriana from the 4th century, this name is written as Seruitio.
- In the Notitia Dignitatum from about 400 AD, this name is written as Servitii.
- In the Ravenna Cosmography from the 7th and 8th centuries, this name is written as Serbitium.

All mentioned forms of the name (including Serbinon, Serbinum, Servitium, Seruitio, Servitii, and Serbitium) refer to a single place, which is identified as present-day Gradiška.

The settlement is primarily believed to have been located on the right bank of the river Savus, but there was also a corresponding settlement on the left bank, near today's Stara Gradiška that some modern-day local sources also identify as Servitium.

== History ==
In Roman times, the Municipium Servicium was an important crossroad between the east and the south of the Balkans, i.e. a port for the Roman river fleet, which speaks for itself about the strategic importance of the settlement at the time.

The city could possibly be named after Serboi, ancient Sarmatian tribe, which perhaps inhabited the Pannonian Plain together with Iazyges.
