= Ad Statuas (Thrace) =

Settlement and station (mutatio) of ancient Thrace

Coordinates: 41°11′10″N 28°24′11″E

Ad Statuas was a settlement and station (mutatio) of ancient Thrace, inhabited during Byzantine times.

Its site is located near İnceğiz in European Turkey.
