= Andautonia =

Ancient Roman settlement in Pannonia

- Dautonia
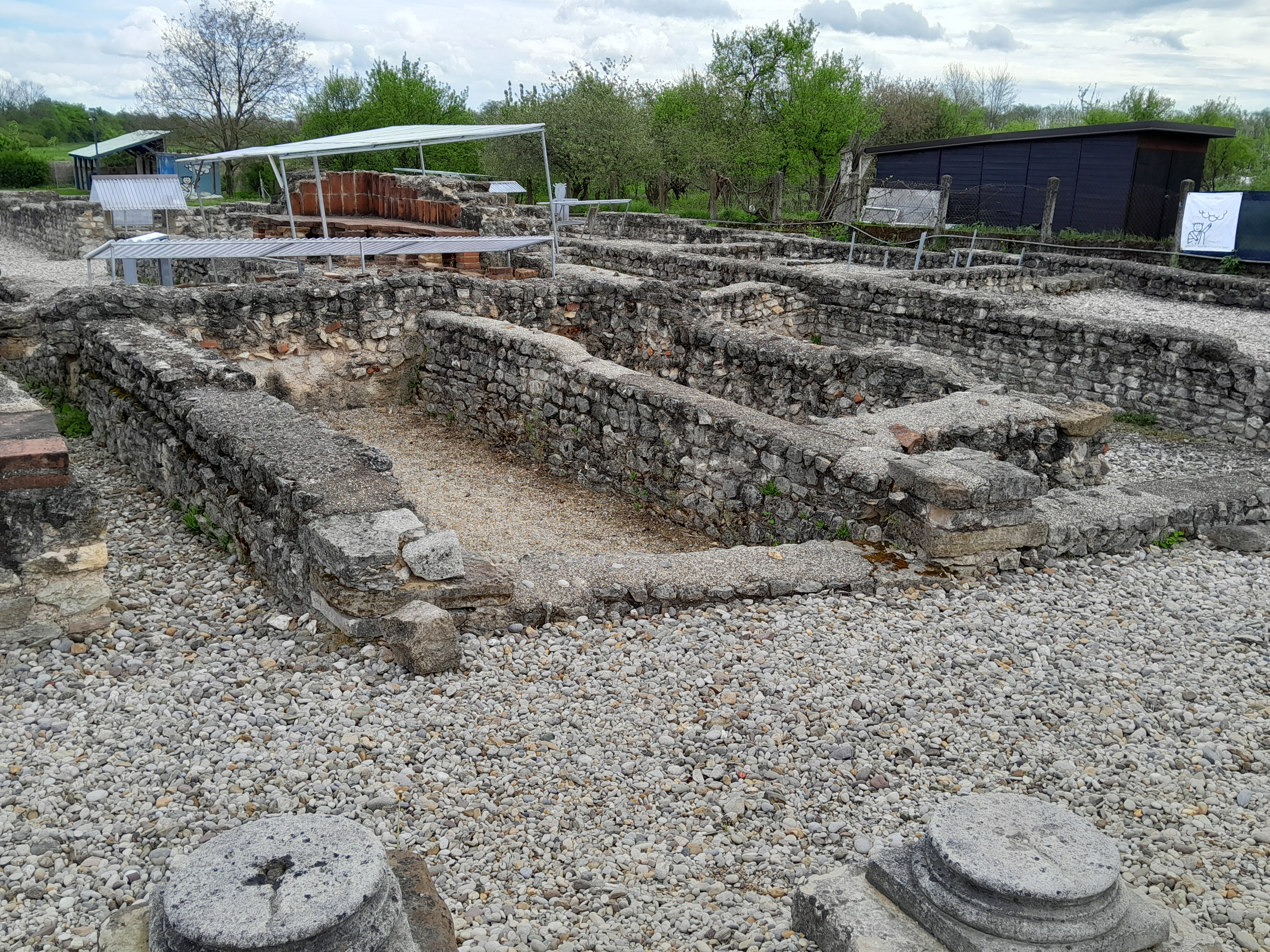
- Ancient ruins of Andautonia

- Location within Croatia
- Interactive map of Andautonia
- 45°46′24.8″N 16°7′0.7″E
- Type: Settlement
- Location: Šćitarjevo, Zagreb County, Croatia

History
- Built: 1st c.
- Abandoned: 5th c.

Site notes
- Area: over 2,000 m^{2} (22,000 sq ft)
- Excavation dates: 1883–
- Public access: yes

Andautonia was a Roman settlement located on the southern bank of the river Sava, located in the modern-day village of Šćitarjevo, southeast of the city of Zagreb, Croatia.

Andautonia was located in the Roman province of Pannonia, on the Roman road connecting Poetovia and Siscia (modern-day towns of Ptuj and Sisak).

According to the 19th-century Croatian archaeologist Šime Ljubić, the toponym Andautonia (Ancient Greek: Ἀνδαυτόνιον) was mentioned by the ancient geographer Ptolemy in his 2nd-century work Geography, who placed it, perhaps inaccurately, between the settlements of Bononia and Novidunum (present-day Banoštor in northern Serbia and Krško in Slovenia). The only other mention of the same settlement was found in the Antonine Itinerary, believed to date from the early 3rd century, which refers to the place as Dautonia.

The road connected Andautonia with Poetovium via Pyrri and Aquaviva to the north, and Siscia to the south. The settlement is believed to have existed between the 1st and the 4th century AD, after which it is believed to have been destroyed during the Great Migration in Europe.

In the modern age, its name was first discovered written on a stone tablet recovered in Stenjevec (today a western part of Zagreb) in 1758 and then another one in the village of Šćitarjevo itself in 1768.

During the 19th century, Roman stone and brick material that could still be found in these areas was by and large removed and reused in the construction of new buildings, thereby removing the surface traces of Andautonia's location. The settlement's location was disputed at the time, with various claims made by cartographers and historians including Latius, Lapie, Reichard, d'Anville, Krčelić, Blašković, Katančić and Kukuljević.

It was finally properly deduced by German scholar Theodor Mommsen and published in the Corpus Inscriptionum Latinarum in 1873. Not long after Mommsen's placement, the Zagreb Archaeological Museum started its first excavations in Šćitarjevo and found numerous Roman artifacts at the depth of about 1 metre (3.3 ft), confirming the location.

Almost a century later, a series of excavations were done on the site between 1969 and 1980, and since 1981 archaeologists also looked into the backyard of the local parish building in the modern-day village centre. They found remains of streets, the sewer system, various buildings, city walls, and a necropolis. In 1994, an archeological park open to visitors was built in the village.

The town is believed to have been a municipium, a second-tier type of settlement reserved for important tribal centres that came under Roman control. Its residents had local authority to govern their affairs but did not have full Roman citizenship. For approximately 300 years the town is believed to have been the main administrative, political, and cultural centre in the area. Among the artefacts excavated is a relief of the goddess Nemesis, commonly associated with gladiator events, indicating that the town may have had an amphitheatre.

Pottery, tools, coins and other assorted artefacts found range in date from the reign of Emperor Titus (79–81) to Emperor Valens (364–378) and the inscription found in 1768 contains a dedication to Herennia Etruscilla, wife of Emperor Decius who ruled from 249 to 251, referring to her as mater castrorum ("mother of the (army) camps").

According to linguist Petar Šimunović (2013), the toponym Andautonia likely dates from pre-Roman times, and is derived from the Proto-Indo-European prefix an- ("near") and *dheu̯- ("to flow"), meaning "a place by the river", as the settlement was on the banks of the Sava River.

== Sources ==
- Ljubić, Šime (November 1883). "Andautonia (Šćitarjevo)". Journal of the Zagreb Archaeological Museum (in Croatian). 5 (1).
- Kušan, Dora; Nemeth-Ehrlich, Dorica (January 1996). "Arheološki park Andautonija u Ščitarjevu". Informatica Museologica (in Croatian). 25 (1–4). Zagreb: Museum documentation centre.
- Šimunović, Petar (March 2013). "Predantički toponimi u današnjoj (i povijesnoj) Hrvatskoj" [Pre-Roman placenames in present-day (and historical) Croatia] (PDF). Folia onomastica Croatica (in Croatian) (22). Zagreb: Croatian Academy of Sciences and Arts: 147–214.
