= Surduk =

Surduk Сурдук (Serbian)
- Village (Selo)
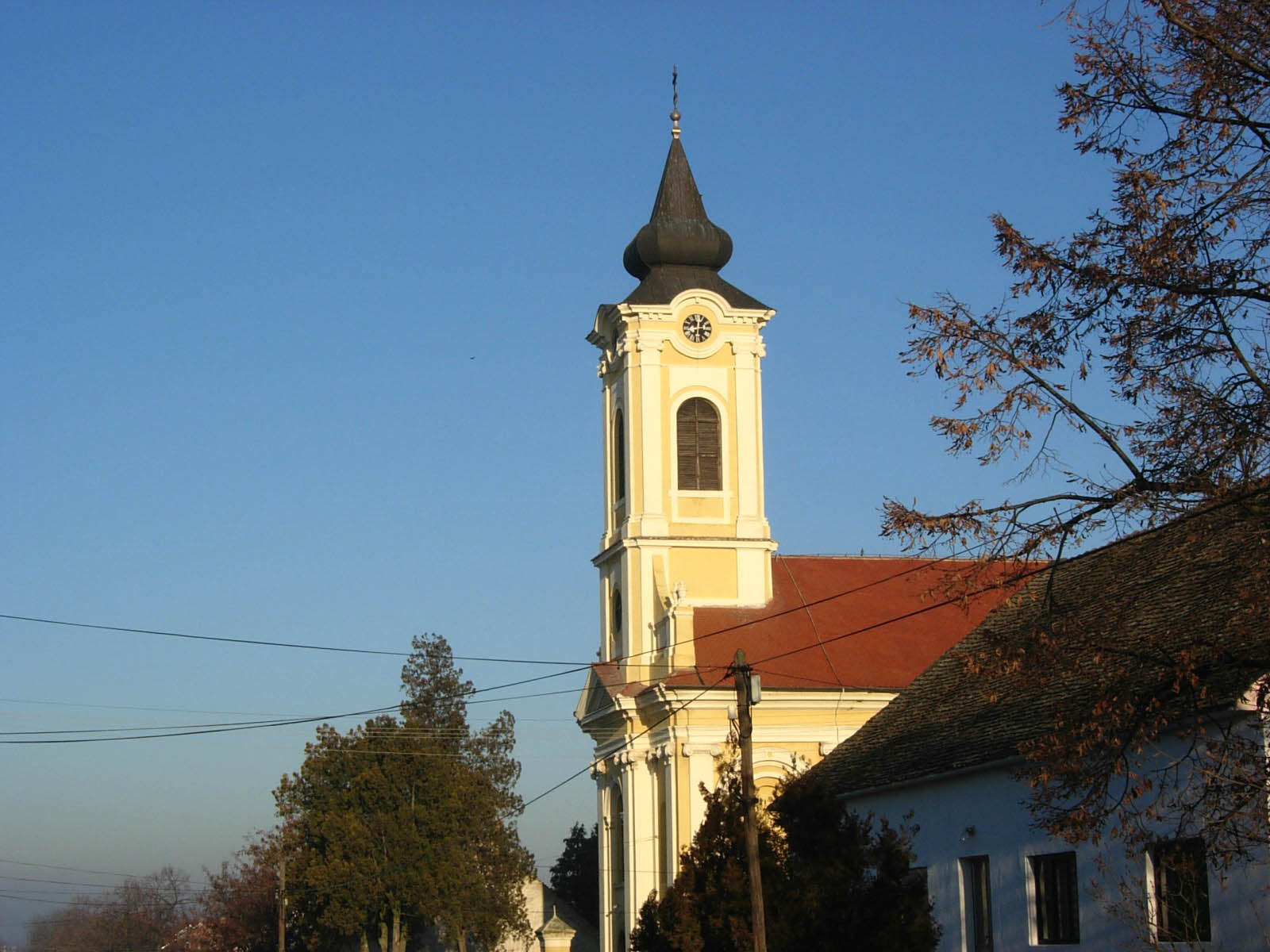
- The Orthodox church of St.Nicholas

- Location within Vojvodina Location within Serbia Location within Europe
- Coordinates: 45°05′N 20°19′E
- Country: Serbia
- Province: Vojvodina
- Region: Syrmia
- District: Srem
- Municipality: Stara Pazova

Area
  - Total: 134 sq mi (346 km^{2})
- Elevation: 358 ft (109 m)

Population (2002)
  - Total: 1,589
  - Density: 1,190/sq mi (459/km^{2})
- Time zone: UTC+1 (CET)
  - Summer (DST): UTC+2 (CEST)
- Postal code: 22307
- Area code: (+381) 022

Surduk (Serbian Cyrillic: Сурдук) is a village in Serbia. It is situated in the Stara Pazova Municipality, in the Srem District of the Vojvodina Autonomous Province. The village has a Serb ethnic majority and its population numbering 1,202 people (2022 census).

== Name ==
Surduk derives its name from the Turkish word for the cliffs near the Danube river. In ancient times it was known as Rittium. In Serbian it is known as Surduk, and in Hungarian as Szurdok.

== Ethnic groups (2002 census) ==
- Serbs = 1,463 (92.07%)
- Roma = 61
- Slovaks = 10
- Greek = 1
- others (including Hungarians, Croats, etc.).

== Historical population ==
- 1961: 1,782
- 1971: 1,467
- 1981: 1,332
- 1991: 1,253

== See also ==
- List of places in Serbia
- List of cities, towns and villages in Vojvodina
