= Novi Banovci =

Novi Banovci Нови Бановци (Serbian)
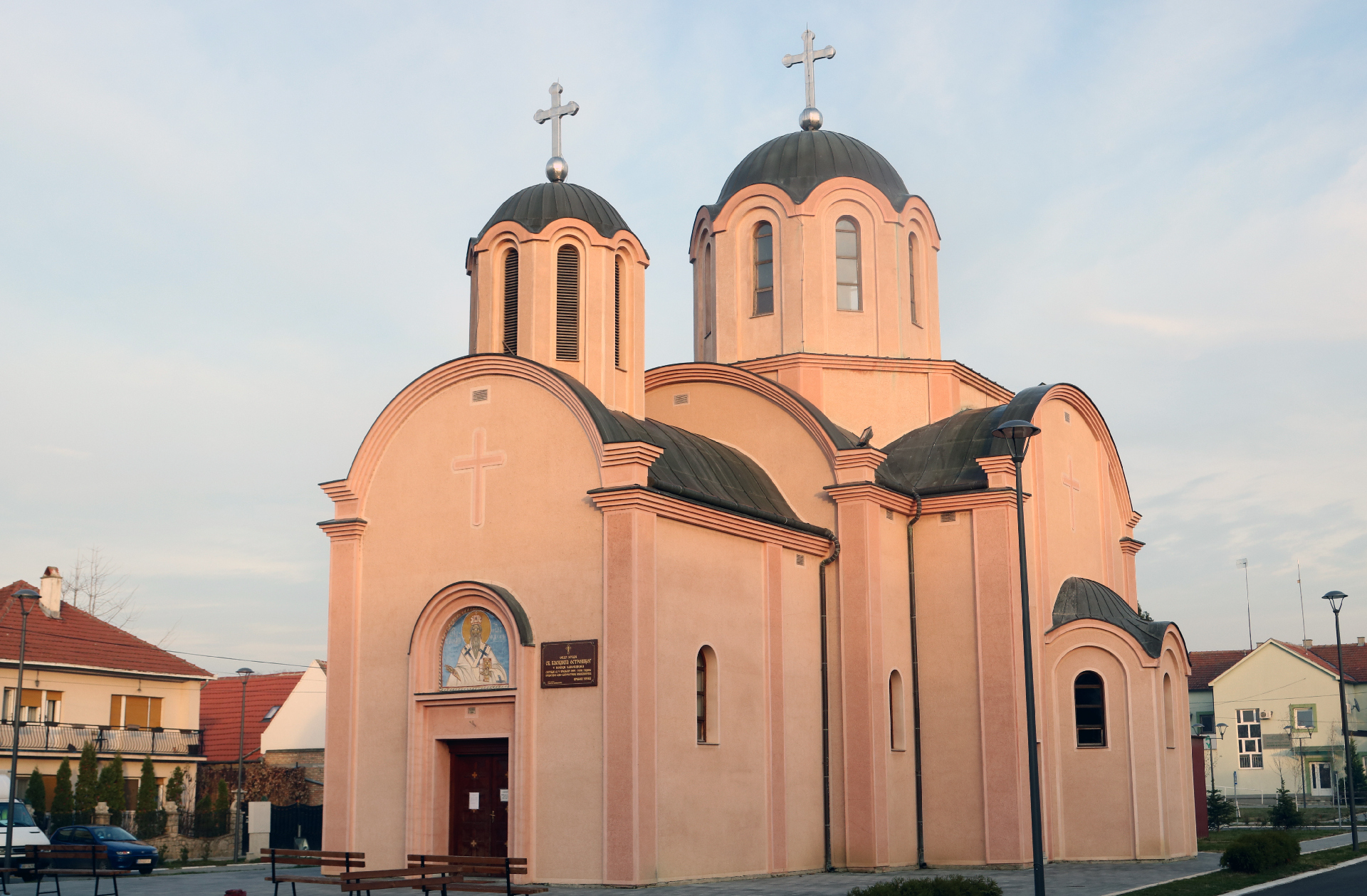
- The new Orthodox church dedicated to Saint Basil of Ostrog

- Location within Vojvodina Location within Serbia Location within Europe
- Coordinates: 44°57′N 20°17′E
- Country: Serbia
- Province: Vojvodina
- Region: Syrmia
- District: Srem
- Municipality: Stara Pazova

Area
  - Total: 8.70 km^{2} (3.36 sq mi)

Population (2011)
  - Total: 9,443
- Time zone: UTC+1 (CET)
  - Summer (DST): UTC+2 (CEST)

Novi Banovci (Serbian Cyrillic: Нови Бановци) is a settlement in Serbia by the Danube River. It is situated in the Stara Pazova Municipality, in the Srem District, in the Autonomous Province of Vojvodina. It is located 5 kilometers away from Batajnica and 20 km from the capital, Belgrade. Novi Banovci is situated on the Belgrade-Novi Sad highway. It has a Serb ethnic majority and its population totals 9,443 people (2011 census).

== Name ==
The name of the town in Serbian is plural.

== History ==
Following the Roman conquest in the 1st century BC, the settlement was known as Burgenae.

The village of Novi Banovci was established in 1790 and soon it turned into the first predominantly Lutheran village within the boundaries of the Military Frontier.

Novi Banovci experienced a constant population growth in the 20th century. A significant increase in the neighborhood's population occurred in the mid-1990s, caused by the large influx of refugees from the Yugoslav War, especially after the Oluja military action which forced almost 250,000 Serbs from Croatia into Serbia, and many of them settled at the outskirts of Belgrade.

== Demographics ==
Population of Novi Banovci according to the official censuses:

- 1948: 1,341
- 1953: 1,451
- 1961: 1,592
- 1971: 1,842
- 1981: 4,077
- 1991: 6,354
- 2002: 9,358
- 2011: 9,443

== Sports ==
The local football club is Omladinac (Youth), who compete in Serbian football's third tier as of the 2025-26 season.

== See also ==
- List of places in Serbia
- List of cities, towns and villages in Vojvodina
