= Várdomb =

- Village
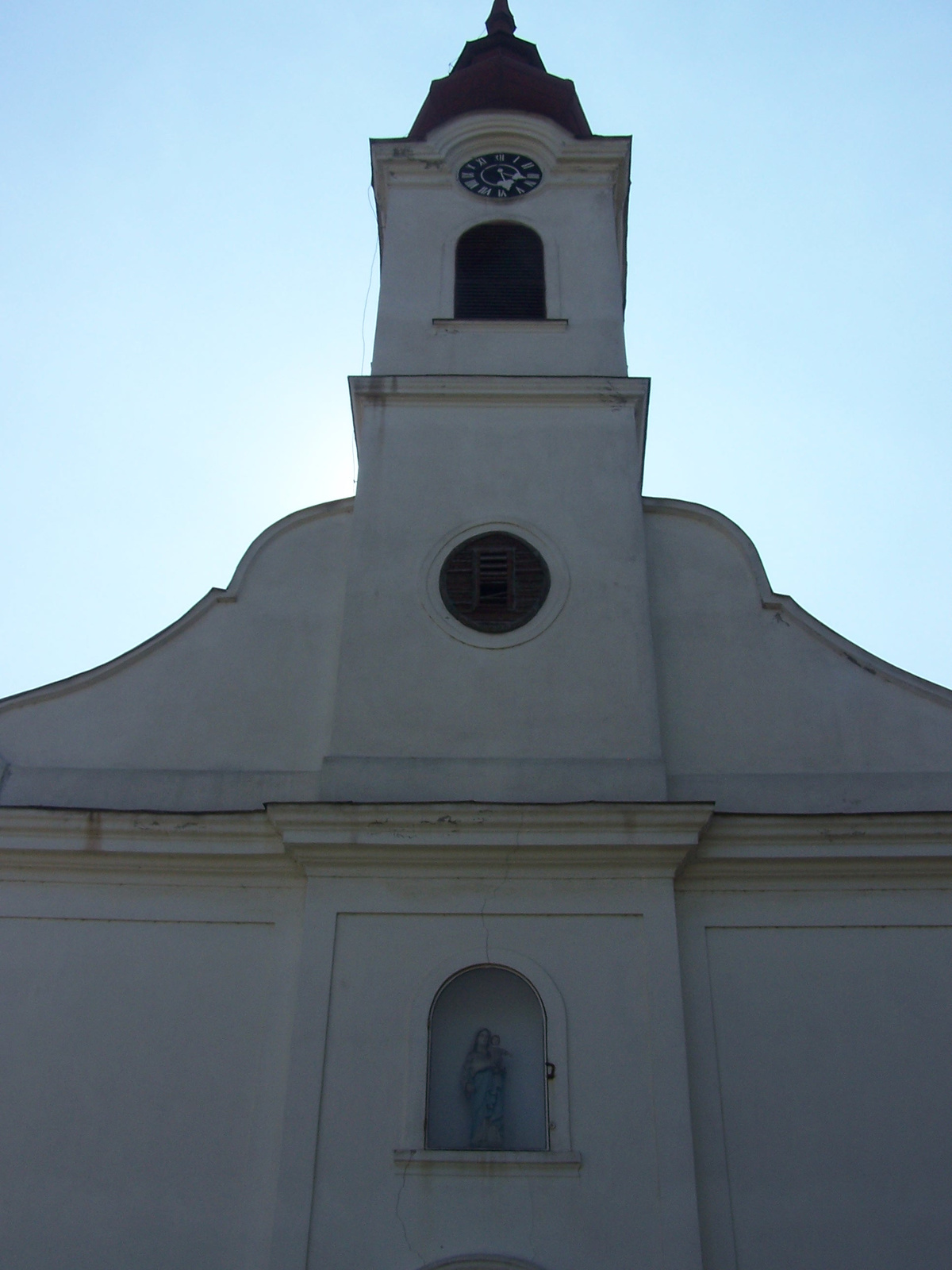
- Roman Catholic Church in Várdomb

- Coat of arms

- Location of Várdomb in Hungary
- Coordinates: 46°14′55″N 18°41′13″E
- Country: Hungary
- Region: Southern Transdanubia
- County: Tolna

Area
  - Total: 9.6 km^{2} (3.7 sq mi)

Population (2011)
  - Total: 1,177
  - Density: 120/km^{2} (320/sq mi)
- Time zone: UTC+1 (CET)
  - Summer (DST): UTC+2 (CEST)
- Postal code: 7100 7146
- Area code: +36 74
- Website: www.vardomb.hu

Várdomb is a village in Tolna county, Hungary.
