= Petrijanec =

- Municipality
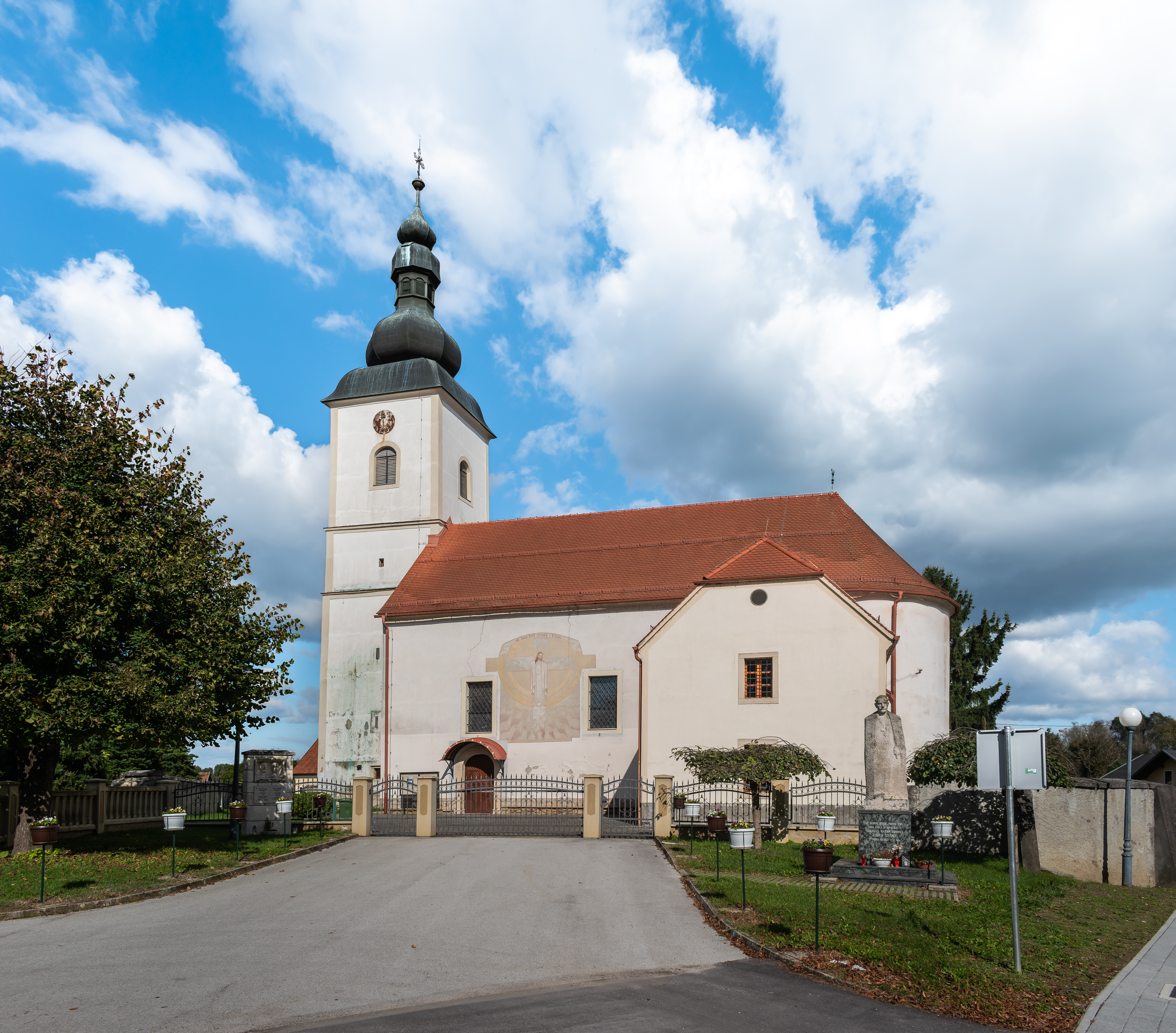
- Interactive map of Petrijanec
- Location of Petrijanec in Croatia
- Country: Croatia
- County: Varaždin County

Area
  - Municipality: 47.9 km^{2} (18.5 sq mi)
  - Urban: 13.8 km^{2} (5.3 sq mi)

Population (2021)
  - Municipality: 4,553
  - Density: 95.1/km^{2} (246/sq mi)
  - Urban: 1,349
  - Urban density: 97.8/km^{2} (253/sq mi)
- Website: petrijanec.hr

Petrijanec is a village and municipality in Croatia in Varaždin County.

In the 2011 census, there were a total of 4,812 inhabitants, in the following settlements:

- Donje Vratno, population 395
- Družbinec, population 544
- Majerje, population 757
- Nova Ves Petrijanečka, population 895
- Petrijanec, population 1,429
- Strmec Podravski, population 663
- Zelendvor, population 129

The absolute majority of population are Croats.

The ancient Roman settlement of Aquaviva, Pannonia is believed to have been located in the same place.

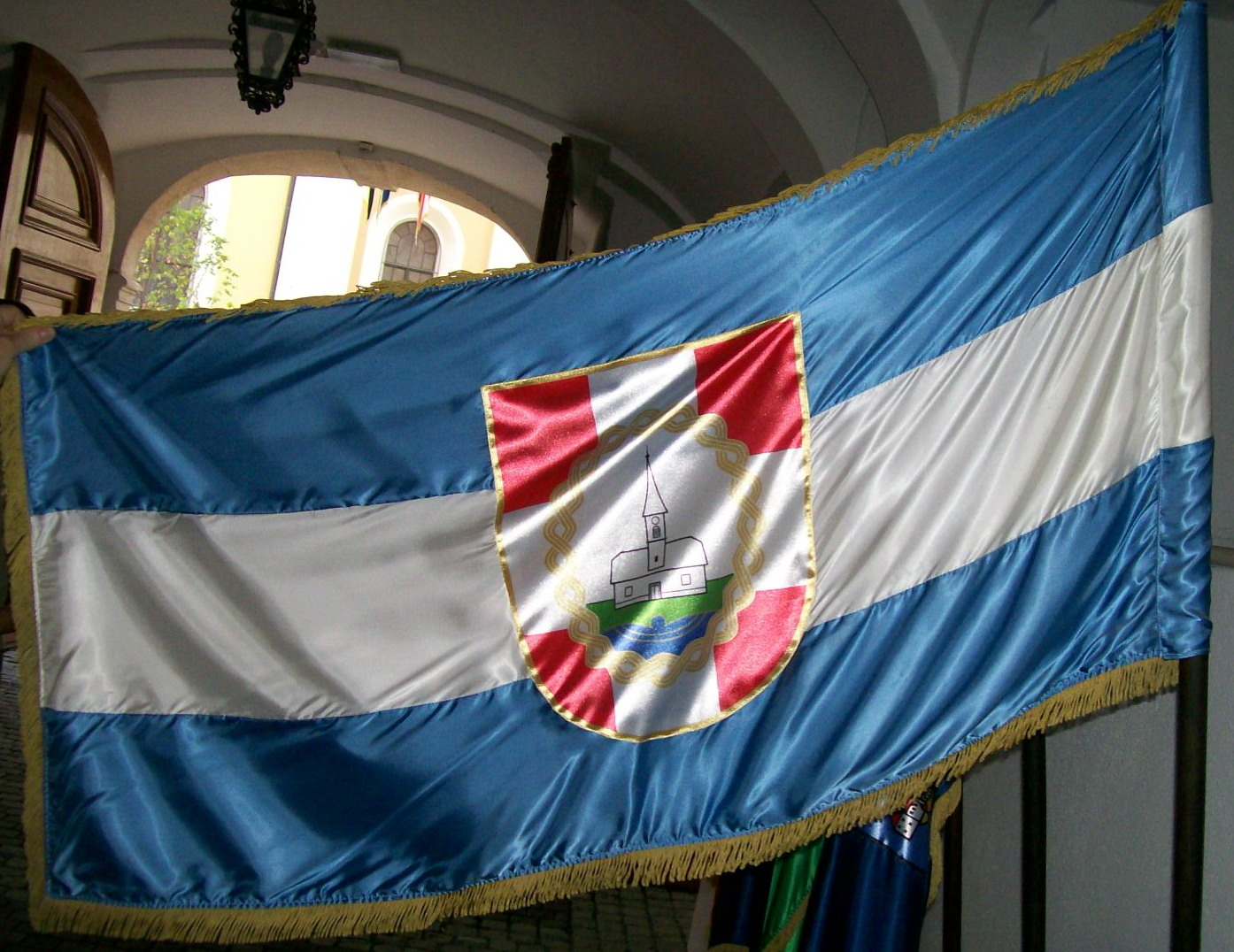
Flag of Municipality of Petrijanec
