= Aquaviva, Pannonia =

Aquaviva or Aqua Viva was an ancient Roman settlement in Pannonia, the crossroads that had connected Poetovio (today's Ptuj) in the west with Mursa (Osijek) to the east and Siscia (Sisak) to the south. Its precise location is unknown; it is speculated that it's located in Petrijanec near Varaždin. Earlier sources placed it somewhere between Maruševec and Sveti Juraj.

== Sources ==
- Ljubić, Šime (November 1883). "Andautonia (Šćitarjevo)". Journal of the Zagreb Archaeological Museum (in Croatian). 5 (1).
