= Šćitarjevo =

- Naselje
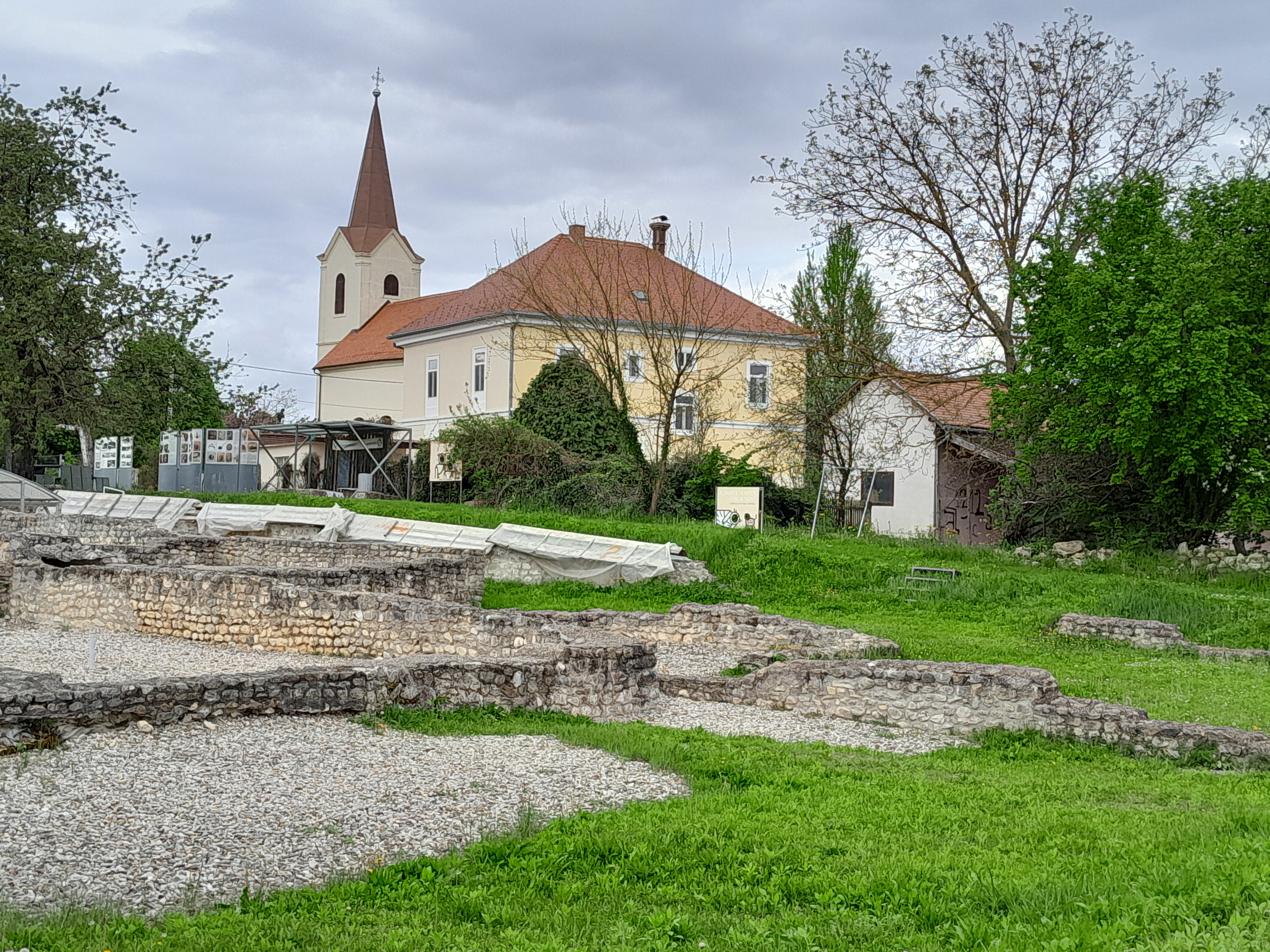
- Ancient ruins of Andautonia and Šćitarjevo

- Location of Šćitarjevo in Croatia
- Coordinates: 45°46′18″N 16°7′5″E
- Country: Croatia
- Region: Central Croatia
- County: Zagreb County
- City: Velika Gorica

Area
  - Total: 4.7 km^{2} (1.8 sq mi)

Population (2021)
  - Total: 573
  - Density: 120/km^{2} (320/sq mi)
- Time zone: UTC+01:00 (CET)
  - Summer (DST): UTC+02:00 (CEST)
- Postal code: 10410
- Area code: +385-1
- License plates: ZG

Šćitarjevo is a settlement that is officially part of the city of Velika Gorica, Croatia.

It is located near the Zagreb bypass and the recently built Homeland Bridge. Its main tourist attraction and cultural site is Andautonia, an archaeological site with remains of a once bustling Roman city.

== History ==
For the fortification of Ivanić in 1598, Šćitarjevo had to supply 30 labourers and 3 carts.
