= Pannonia (disambiguation) =

Pannonia was a province of the Roman Empire.

Pannonia or Pannonian may also refer to:

== Places ==
- Basin of Pannonia, a geomorphological region (plain) in Central Europe
- Sea of Pannonia, an ancient (former) sea in Central Europe
- Steppe of Pannonia, a grassland ecosystem in the Pannonian Plain
- Diocese of Pannonia, a late Roman diocese
- Pannonia (Byzantine province), a Byzantine province
- March of Pannonia, a Frankish province
- Principality of Lower Pannonia, a Slavic principality in the 9th century vassal to the Franks
- Pannonia, the territory of the medieval kingdom of Hungary and Rex Pannoniae (Pannonicorum in medieval Latin), the king of Hungary; see Name of Hungary § Pannonia Hungary

== Science ==
- Pannonian (stage), the Paratethys domain (Central Europe, west Asia) in the stratigraphy; see List of geochronologic names
- 1444 Pannonia, an asteroid
- Pannonia, a part of the surface of the asteroid 21 Lutetia

== Other ==
- CIG Pannónia, a Hungarian life insurance firm
- Pannónia, a brand of motorcycles manufactured in Hungary; see Jawa 350
- Pannonia Express, an InterCity passenger train from Budapest to Bucharest
- Panonija, a village in Serbia

== See also ==
- Upper Pannonia (disambiguation)
- Lower Pannonia (disambiguation)
- Eastern Pannonia (disambiguation)
- Northern Pannonia (disambiguation)
- Southern Pannonia (disambiguation)
- Pannonian Croatia (disambiguation)
- Pannonian language (disambiguation)
- PannóniaFilm, the largest animation studio in Hungary
- Pannonians, an ancient people
- La Pannonie, an old Cistercian farm near Rocamadour in France, and a castle built in the 15th and 18th century
