= Pannonian language =

Pannonian language may refer to:

- Pannonian Romance language, a distinctive Romance language in Pannonia
- Pannonian Rusyn language, a linguistic variety of Rusyn language
- extinct language of ancient Pannonians from the pre-Roman era

== See also ==
- Pannonia (disambiguation)
- Language (disambiguation)
