= Rhetorical operations =

Classification of figures of speech

In classical rhetoric, figures of speech are classified as one of the four fundamental rhetorical operations or quadripartita ratio: addition (adiectio), omission (detractio), substitution (substitutio) and transposition (transmutatio).

== Classical origins ==
The Latin book Rhetorica ad Herennium (author unknown) from the 90s BCE, calls these four operations ἔνδεια, πλεονασμός, μετάθεσις and ἐναλλαγή. Philo of Alexandria (c. 25 BCE – c. 50 CE), writing in Greek, listed the operations as addition (πρόσθεσις), subtraction (ἀφαίρεσις), transposition (μετάθεσις), and transmutation (ἀλλοίωσις). Quintilian (c. 35 – c. 100) mentioned them in Institutio Oratoria (c. 95 CE).

Quintilian saw rhetoric as the science of the possible deviation from a given norm, or from a pre-existing text taken as a model. Each variation can be seen as a figure (figures of speech or figures of thought). From this perspective, Quintilian famously formulated four fundamental operations according to the analysis of any such variation.

Heinrich Lausberg offers one of the most complete and detailed summaries of classical rhetoric, from the perspective of Quintillian's four operations, in his 1960 treatise Handbook of literary rhetoric.

== Reorganization by Groupe μ ==
In 1970, the Belgian semioticians known under the name Groupe μ, reorganized the four operations. First, they observed that the so-called transposition operation can be redefined as a series of addition and omission operations, so they renamed it as "omission-addition". They categorized the addition, omission and omission-addition operation as substantial operations, while they considered permutations as categorized permutation as relational operations.

They distinguished between partial and complete omissions; and between simple or repetitive additions. For an omission-addition operation, they considered it could be either partial, complete, or negative; a negative omission-addition operation is when it omits a unit and replaces it with its opposite.

== Rhetoric of the image ==
The Belgian semioticians known under the name Groupe μ, developed a method of painting research to apply the fundamental rhetorical operations in the interpretation of a work of painting. The method, called structural semantic rhetoric, aimed at determining the stylistic and aesthetic features of any painting through operations of addition, omission, permutation and transposition from a basic "zero degree" painting.

== Amplification ==
Amplification comes from the Greek word "auxesis". Merriam-Webster defines amplification as follows: "the particulars by which a statement is expanded." Specifically, after an abrupt sentence, amplification is used to expand upon any details. It can also be used to enhance the reader's attention to things which could be missed. Furthermore, amplification refers to a rhetorical device used to add features to a statement.

In rhetoric, amplification refers to the act and means of extending thoughts or statements:

- to increase rhetorical effect,
- to add importance,
- to make the most of a thought or circumstance,
- to add an exaggeration,
- or to change the arrangement of words or clauses in a sequence to increase force.

Amplification may refer to exaggeration or to stylistic vices such as figures of excess or superfluity (e.g., hyperbole).

Amplification involves identifying parts of a text by means of a process of division; each part of the text may be subjected to amplification. Amplification is thus a set of strategies which, taken together, constitute inventio, one of the five classical canons of rhetoric.

As a means of developing multiple forms of expression for a thought, amplification "names an important point of intersection where figures of speech and figures of thought coalesce."

In his book, A Handbook of Rhetorical Devices, author Robert A. Harris explains in depth, "Amplification involves repeating a word or expression while adding more detail to it, in order to emphasize what might otherwise be passed over. In other words, amplification allows you to call attention to, emphasize, and expand a word or idea to make sure the reader realizes its importance or centrality in the discussion." Harris provides examples of amplification: "In my hunger after ten days of rigorous dieting I saw visions of ice cream – mountains of creamy, luscious ice cream, dripping with gooey syrup and calories." This example illustrates the rhetorical use of amplification to motivate readers to recognize the significance of this sentence, not just ignore it.

According to the Princeton Encyclopedia of Poetry and Poetics, the word amplification is one of the "special" topics used in epideictic poetry or ceremonial discourse, usually for praise, but it has been used to refer to both the expansion and the diminution of an idea or an argument. The use of the word needs to be defined precisely and used with care. The Princeton Encyclopedia also states that, "limits become clear only when a text signals by some other means (semantic: change of subject; syntactic: end of stanza/poem; pragmatic; change of voice, person, or form of address) a change of direction." Amplification was considered at different times in history "a subset of both inventio and dispositio." Aristotle mentions in The Poetics "maximizing and minimizing" as important elements in relation to amplification. This is similar to the way we commonly think of amplification; that is going from something smaller and being enlarged. In The Rhetoric, Aristotle contrasts amplification with depreciation and admits "they both derive from an enthymeme which serves to show how a thing is great or small." The Princeton Encyclopedia of Poetry and Poetics also tells us that Cicero in De Oratore "introduced the confusion between amplification and attenuation by saying that the highest distinction of eloquence consists in amplification by means of ornament, which can be used to make one's speech not only increase the importance of a subject and raise it to a higher level, but also to diminish and disparage it". The relationship between the words 'conciseness' and 'amplification' is heavy. Nevin Laib, author of Conciseness and Amplification explains that, "We need to encourage profuseness as well as concision, to teach not just brevity but also loquacity, the ability to extend, vary, and expatiate upon one's subject at length to shape, build, augment, or alter the force and effect of communication, and to repeat oneself inventively. In classical rhetoric, this was the art of amplification. It included elaboration, emphasis, and copiousness of style." The message and understanding of amplification seem blurry to many students. Laib says, "The stylistic values implicit in our theories, pedagogy, and culture, so overwhelmingly favor conciseness, that elaboration gets lost in the learning process". Silva Rhetoricae provided by Gideon Burton of Brigham Young University understands amplification as something that can be used as a basic notion of imitation: to change the content of a model while retaining its form, or to change its form while retaining the content (varying a sentence; double translation; metaphrasis; paraphrasis; epitome).

== See also ==
- Rhetorical reason
