= Eastern Pannonia =

Eastern Pannonia (Latin: Pannonia orientalis) may refer to:

- in geography, eastern regions of the Pannonian Basin
- in ancient history, eastern Panonnian province, known as Pannonia Inferior, divided into:
  - late Roman Province of Pannonia Valeria, and
  - late Roman Province of Pannonia Secunda
- in early medieval history, eastern regions of the March of Pannonia

== See also ==
- Pannonia (disambiguation)
