= Figure of thought =

Rhetorical device

A figure of thought (Latin: figura sententiae; Greek: σχῆμα διανοίας schema dianoias) is a rhetorical device sometimes distinguished from figure of speech. In another sense, the term has been used in the study of diagrams and drawings.

== Application to Latin literature ==
It may be difficult to draw the distinction between figures of speech and figures of thought, especially when the primary area of inquiry is poetry rather than a prose composition, which adheres to the rules of rhetorical theory that were for the most part created in their fullest articulation in the age of Quintilian (c. 35 – c. 100). In their approach to language, the Roman poets (Horace, Catullus, Propertius, Tibullus) did not distinguish between inventio and elocutio, which explains somewhat our confusion between figures of thought and figures of speech. The latter are exemplified most immediately by conceptual substitutions, such as metaphor or synecdoche, but if we consider not just the mere linguistic aspect of the substitution and focus most closely on the concepts themselves, then we may perceive the comprehensiveness of the conceptual for the poet, who operates with words to extend and amplify the potential semantics of poetic output.

== Uses of the term ==
Ananda Coomaraswamy used the term in relation to the philosophy of Plato:

"Plato’s dialectic makes continual use of figures of speech, which are really figures of thought."

The scholar of Latin literature Gordon Williams (died 2010) published a study titled Figures of Thought in Roman Poetry (1980), stating in the introduction:

"Language was subject to ordering by exhaustive description of vocabulary, syntax, and figures. The content was likewise subject to ordering by the rules of inventio (the technique by which all the latent or inherent possibilities in a given idea or cluster of ideas could be 'discovered' and exploited)."

A collection of drawings by Nikolaus Gansterer (2011) was titled "Drawing a Hypothesis: Figures of Thought".

== See also ==
- Rhetorical operations
