= Southern Pannonia =

Southern Pannonia may refer to:

- in geography, southern regions of the Pannonian Basin
- in ancient history, southern regions of the Roman Province of Pannonia, including:
  - late Roman Province of Pannonia Savia, and
  - late Roman Province of Pannonia Secunda
- in medieval history, early medieval Slavic Principality of Lower Pannonia (Pannonia inferior) and the Balaton Principality

== See also ==
- Northern Pannonia (disambiguation)
