= Upper Pannonia =

Upper Pannonia may refer to:

- Pannonia Superior, Roman province that existed between the years 103 and 296
- Northern portion of the March of Pannonia, Frankish frontier march that existed between 804 and the 890s

== See also ==
- Lower Pannonia (disambiguation)
