= Heinrich Lausberg =

German rhetorician

Heinrich Lausberg (12 October 1912, Aachen – 11 April 1992, Münster) was a German rhetorician, classical philologist and historical linguist specialising in Romance studies. His 1960 treatise, Handbook of literary rhetoric, is one of the most complete and detailed summaries of classical rhetoric from the perspective of Quintillian's quadripartita ratio.
