= Pannonian Latin =

Extinct Eastern Romance language

- Pannonian Romance
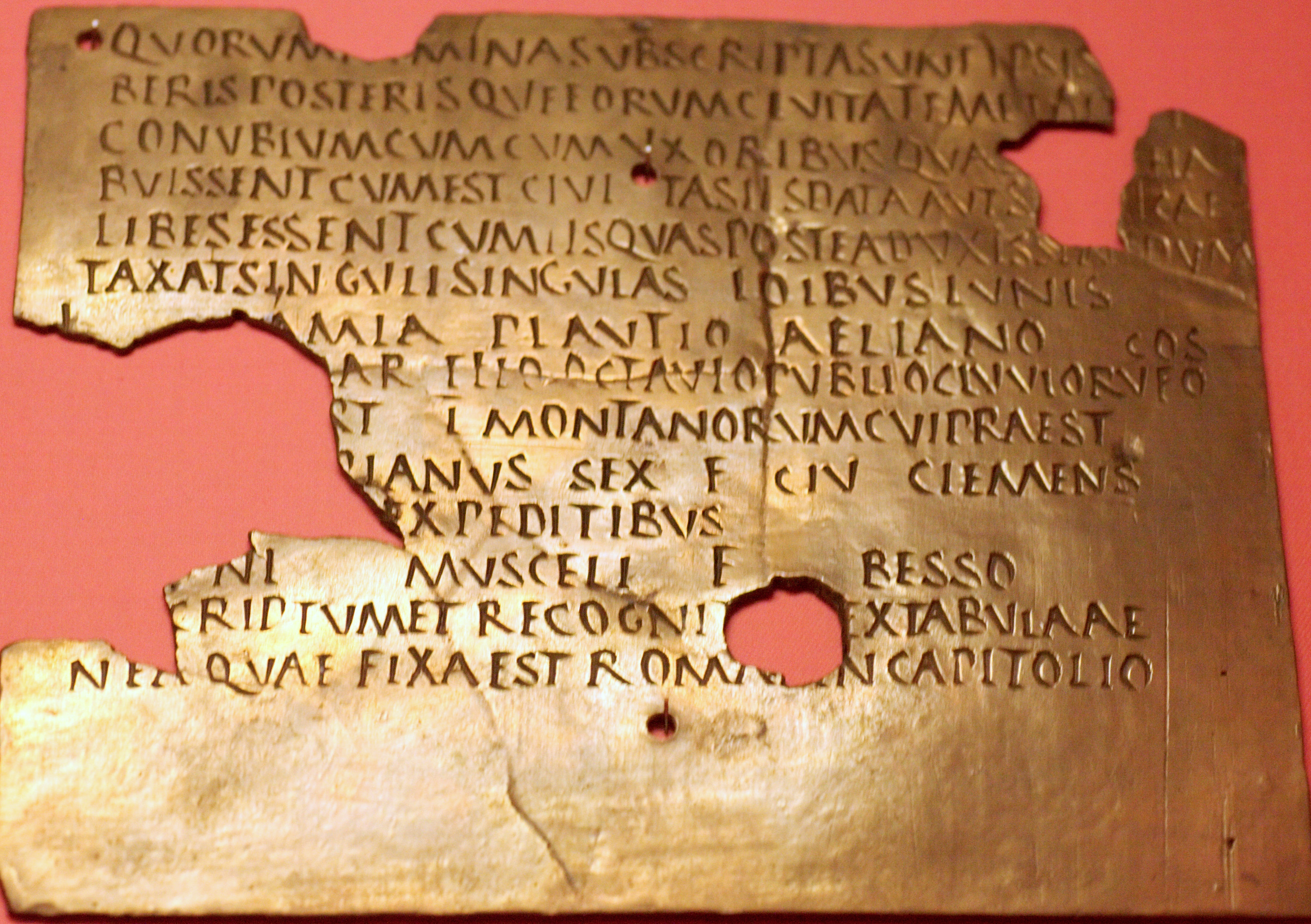
- Surviving fragment of a Roman military diploma found at Carnuntum (now in Austria) in the province of Pannonia
- Region: Pannonia
- Extinct: 10th century AD
- Language family: Indo-European: Italic; Latino-Faliscan; Latin; Romance; Pannonian Latin

Language codes
- ISO 639-3: –

Pannonian Latin (also known as Pannonian Romance) was a variant of Vulgar Latin that developed in Pannonia, but became extinct after the loss of the province.

== History ==
Pannonia province in the Roman Empire in 125

Most likely the bigger part of the indigenous population spoke P-Celtic. This was influenced by the neighbouring cultures (eg. Illyrian and Scythian). Unfortunately, the surviving data is not enough to distinguish their tribes' languages.

The conquest of the region by the Roman Empire was completed by 9 BC, and the territory integrated into Illyricum. In 10 AD Pannonia was organized as a separate province.

In Pannonia the material culture of the native population showed little sign of Romanization in the first 160 years of Roman rule.

In the second half of the second century there were major changes in the composition of the population, but the organic continuity of the Latin language development of the area is unbroken. The particularly destructive Marcomannic Wars changed the ethno-linguistic makeup of the province: speakers of the indigenous Celtic and Illyrian languages decreased in number, to be replaced by immigrants of different culture. This strengthened the position of Latin, allowing it to play an intermediary role.

The Pannonian provinces were exposed in the Migration Period starting in the fourth century. By 401, mass emigration became general after two hard decades full with Germanic and equestrian nomadic invasions. Hunnic control expanded gradually from 410, and concluded with the cession of Pannonia by the Western Roman Empire in 433. Only sporadic groups remained after the 5th century. Almost all families fled by the establishment of the Avar Khaganate in the second half of the 6th century, many moving to the Croatian coast or being taken by the Lombards into the Italian Peninsula.

== Characteristics ==
Analysis of the Vulgar Latin spoken in Pannonia showed several phonetical developments:

- the shortening of /ll/ and /nn/ geminates.
- the merger of unstressed /e/~/i/ (Decibali for Decebali), but /o/~/u/ fusion is less noticeable.
- disappearance of /h/ from the 4th century onwards.
- /ns/ simplified to /n/, /nt/ to /t/ - less often to /n/. /nkt/ group was simplified to /nt/ or /kt/, but it is not known why the development was not uniform.
- palatalization of plosives /t/, /d/, /k/ is poorly attested.
- reduction of the diphthong /au̯/ to /a/ (Ladicena < Laodicena), and /ae̯/ to /e/ ( bone < bonae).
- lenition is attested (extricado < extricatus) from the 3rd century.

As in other provinces, accusatives after the 1st century AD were regularly switched to nominatives as the subjects of verbs, ergo -as was often written instead of -ae, which is the correct plural inflection of first-declension feminine nouns. Many instances of this error are found on a perhaps 3rd century epitaph from Pannonia. It says hic quescunt duas matres duas filias... et aduenas II paruolas (CIL III 3551), which means "here lie two mothers, two daughters... and two young foreign girls".

The dative and genitive cases are evidently quite common in the inscriptions. This ratio unmistakably indicates that Pannonia was where the dative-genitive fusion was most significant relative to the rest of the empire, since the rate is 45 % in Pannonia and 24 % for the entire empire.

An examination of the Pannonian Latin texts as a whole reveals that the process of amalgamation has only begun in linguistic singular.

Accusative-ablative mergers account for 15% of case errors in Pannonian Latin.

== Historiography ==
The investigation of the language of Pannonian Latin inscriptions has been relatively neglected until recent times, until the appearance of the monograph of Bence Fehér in 2007: Pannonia latin nyelvtörténete (The Latin Linguistic History of Pannonia). Notable older works are Béla Luzsenszky: A pannóniai latin feliratok nyelvtana (Grammar of the Pannonian Latin Inscriptions) from 1933, and József Herman: Latinitas Pannonica: kísérlet a pannóniai feliratok latinságának jellemzésére (Latinitas Pannonica: Attempt at Characterizing the Latinity of the Pannonian Inscriptions) from 1968.

== See also ==
- African Romance
- Moselle Romance
- British Romance
- Dialects of Latin

== Bibliography ==
- Péterváry, Brigitta (2012). Adamik, Béla (ed.). A kelta nyelv hatása a pannoniai latinságra [Influence of the Celtic language on the Pannonian Latinity] (in Hungarian). Eötvös Loránd University.
- Gonda, Attila (2016). "Fehér Bence: Pannonia latin nyelvtörténete. Budapest 2007" [Bence Fehér: Pannonia's Latin language history. Budapest 2007.]. Antik Tanulmányok. 60 (1): 93–107. doi:10.1556/092.2016.60.1.7. ISSN 0003-567X.
- Adamik, Béla (2011). "Konszonáns i és vele összefüggő palatalizációk pannoniai latin feliratokon" [The consonant I and related patalizations on the Latin inscriptions of Pannonia] (PDF). In Bánki, Ágnes; Tillinger, Gábor (eds.). Survivance du latin et grammaire textuelle: mélanges offerts à Sándor Kiss à l'occasion de son 70e anniversaire [Survival of Latin and textual grammar: mixtures offered to Sándor Kiss on the occasion of his 70th birthday] (in Hungarian). Debrecen: Debreceni Egyetemi Kiadó. ISBN 978-963-318-123-2.
- Herman, József (2000). Vulgar Latin. Translated by Wright, Robert. Penn State University Press. ISBN 0-271-02001-6.
