= Northern Pannonia =

Northern Pannonia may refer to:

- in geography, northern regions of the Pannonian Basin
- Pannonia Superior, the first Roman northern Pannonia
- in ancient history, northern regions of the Roman Province of Pannonia, including:
  - late Roman Province of Pannonia Prima, and
  - late Roman Province of Pannonia Valeria
- in medieval history, northern regions of the Frankish Avar March and later March of Pannonia, including the Slavic southern pannonian Balaton Principality (see later Pannonia Superior)

== See also ==
- Southern Pannonia (disambiguation)
