= Lower Pannonia =

Lower Pannonia may refer to:

- Pannonia Inferior, a Roman province that existed between the years 103 and 296
- Principality of Lower Pannonia, a Slavic vassal principality, under Frankish suzerainty, during the 9th century

== See also ==
- Upper Pannonia (disambiguation)
