= Pannonia (Byzantine province) =

Province of the Byzantine Empire

Pannonia Provincia Pannonia επαρχία Παννονία
- Province of the Byzantine Empire
- c. 510–580s
- The Byzantine northern Balkans in the 6th century. The province of Pannonia is located in the northwestern corner of imperial territory.
- Capital: Sirmium
- History
  - Established: c. 510
  - Sirmium given to Gepids: 536
  - Avar conquest: 580-582
  - Partition with the Avars: 580s
Succeeded by
Avar Khaganate
- Today part of: Serbia

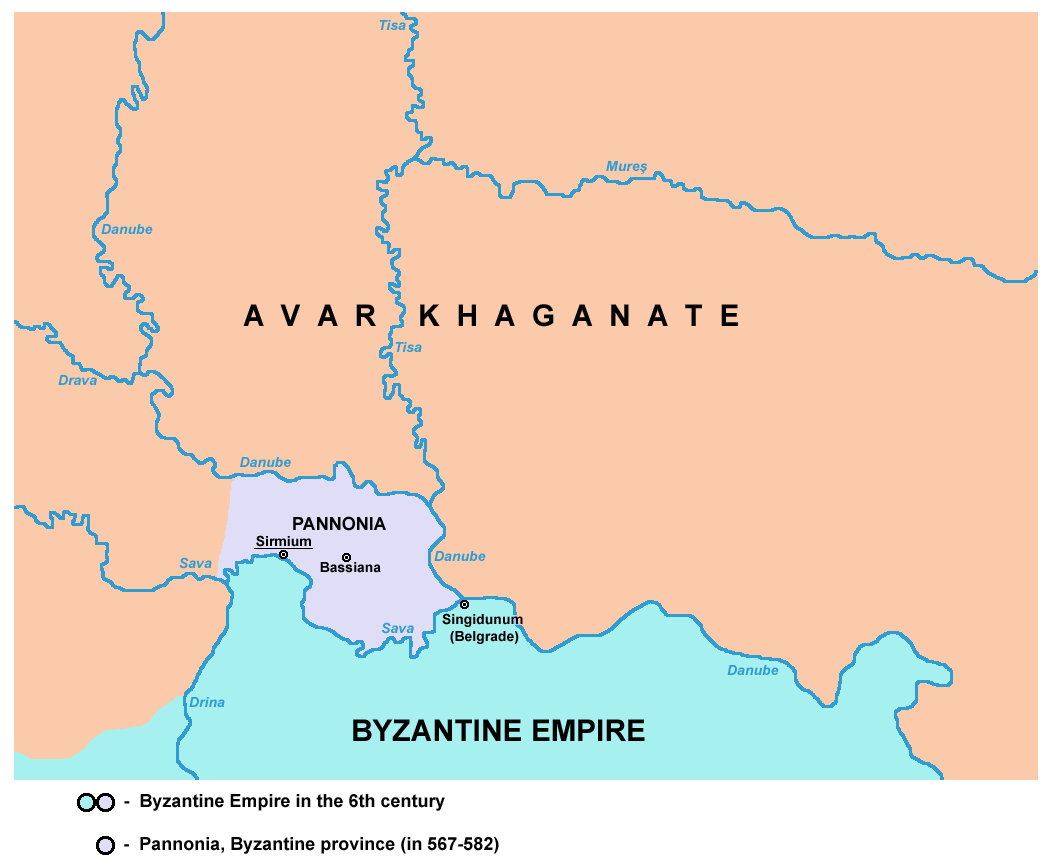
Map of the Byzantine Pannonia

Pannonia was a Byzantine province, which existed in present-day Syrmia region of Serbia in the 6th century. Its capital was Sirmium (modern-day Sremska Mitrovica).

It differed significantly in its area from the Roman province of Pannonia, and it was subordinate to the Diocese of Dacia.

== Geography ==
The province was located between the Danube river in the north-east and Sava river in the south. The western border of Byzantine Pannonia stretched approximately to the estuary or river Drina into Sava. Important cities in the area were Sirmium and Bassianae. Byzantine Pannonia bordered Byzantine province of Moesia Prima in the south and Avar Khaganate in the west, north and east.

== History ==
=== Background ===
Byzantine Pannonia succeeded the name of much bigger classical Roman province of Pannonia. In other words, The Byzantine one covered only a small eastern part of ancient Roman Pannonia. In the 2nd century, the original Roman province was divided into two ones: Pannonia Inferior and Pannonia Superior. Subsequently, the area was subdivided into four provinces finally: Pannonia Prima, Pannonia Valeria, Pannonia Savia and Pannonia Secunda. Capital of Pannonia Secunda was Sirmium.

In the middle of the 5th century, the territory of former Roman Pannonia was ceded to the Huns by Theodosius II, and after the death of Attila it successively passed (entirely or partially) into the hands of the Ostrogoths, Lombards and Gepids.

A contract from 510 assigned most of the territory of former Roman Pannonia (including Sirmium) to the Ostrogoths, while the eastern part of present-day Syrmia (which included the city of Bassianae) was assigned to the Byzantine Empire. In 536, Sirmium was placed under the control of the Gepids. The Lombard–Gepid War (567) ended with a Lombard-Avar victory and annihilation of Gepids, while Sirmium was retaken by the Byzantine Empire.

=== Under the Byzantine Empire ===
From 567 to 573, the Byzantine Empire was in a war with the Avars, who aimed to conquer Byzantine Pannonia. Temporary truce was declared in 573, but the war was resumed. Due to the fact that Byzantine-Persian war also started in this time, the Byzantine Empire was not able to defend Pannonia. The city of Sirmium was finally conquered by the Avars in 582, thus marking end of Roman control of Pannonia since Classical Antiquity.

=== Legacy ===
The Byzantine Empire re-established control over Pannonia in the 11th century, leading to the creation of the Theme of Sirmium to administer the region, but not lasting long.

== See also ==
- Pannonia
- Pannonia Inferior
- Pannonia Secunda
- Theme of Sirmium
- History of Vojvodina
- History of Serbia
