= Pannonia Prima =

Roman province (296 - mid-5th century)

Provincia Pannonia Prima
- province of the Roman Empire
- 296–5th century
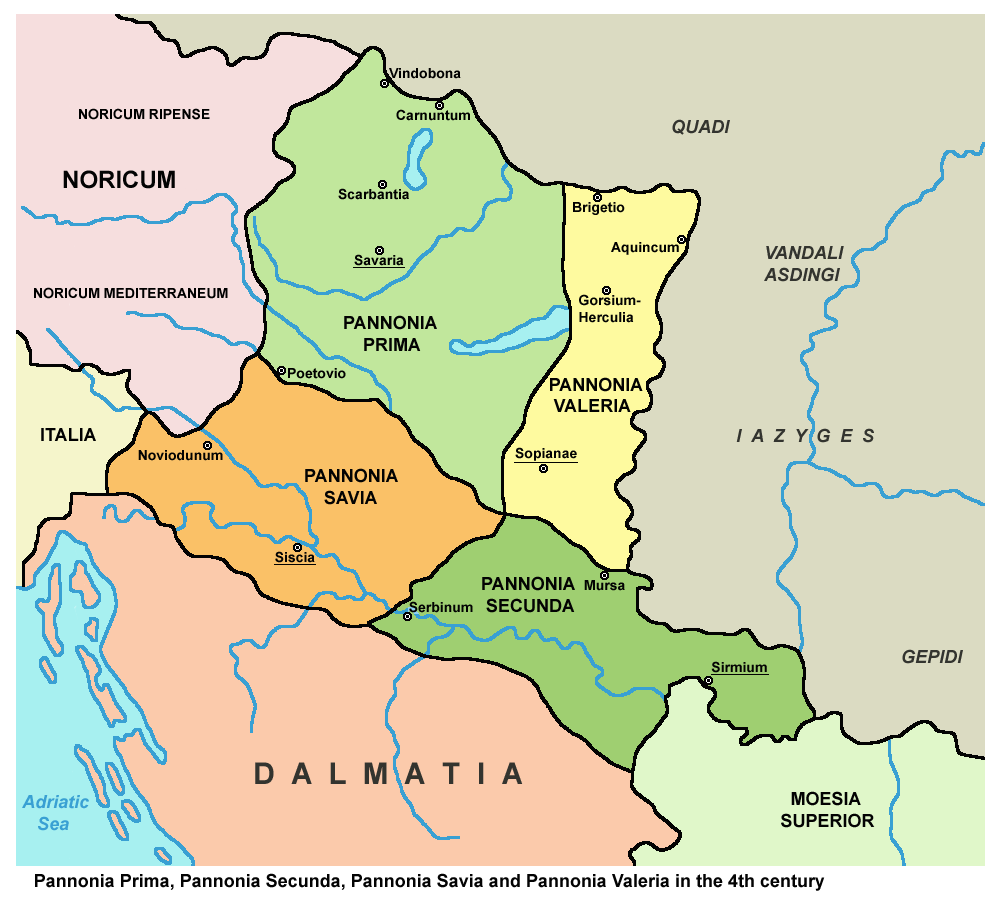
- Capital: Savaria
- History
  - Established: 296
  - Disestablished: 5th century
Preceded by	Succeeded by
Pannonia Superior	Hunnic Empire
- Today part of: Hungary, Austria, Croatia, Slovenia, Slovakia

Pannonia Prima was an ancient Roman province. It was formed in the year 296, during the reign of Emperor Diocletian. Previously, it was a part of the province of Pannonia Superior, which, along with Pannonia Inferior, was gradually divided into four administrative units: Pannonia Prima, Pannonia Secunda, Valeria, and Savia. This transition was completed by the time of Constantine. According to the Notitia Dignitatum, Pannonia Prima was governed by a Praeses.

== Geography ==
Pannonia Prima included parts of present-day Hungary, Austria, Croatia, Slovenia, and Slovakia. Its capital was Savaria (modern Szombathely), a city built during the reign of Claudius. This city was located on an important junction between the Amber Road connecting Italy with Hungary and the road between Treveris and Sirmium. Other important cities were Vindobona (modern Vienna; Wien in German), and Scarbantia (modern Sopron). The city of Sirmium in Pannonia Secunda had administrative oversight over all of the newly created Diocese of Pannonia, along with Dalmatia and Noricum.

Pannonia Prima was the northwestern quadrant of the four subdivisions of Pannonia. It was bordered on the west by the Alps, which stretch from the Danube River to the Adriatic Sea, and belonged to the provinces of Noricum. It is bordered on the north by the Danube and on the south by the Drava river. In the east, it is divided from Valeria by an arbitrary north–south border which is tangent to the east end of lacus Pelso (Lake Balaton). On the other hand, was the fort of Valcum (modern Fenékpuszta), close to the Sirmium-Savaria road. This fort is dated to the Constantian era, and is a center of imperial latifundia. The only Pannonian frontier border was that of the Danube, and it was easily defensible; thus, there were few forts lining that border.

== Decline and Fall ==
Emperor Gratian (367–383) began settling Huns as foederati in Pannonia. Roman money had ceased circulating in all Pannonia north of the Drave (including Pannonia Prima) by 375, indicating that little Roman influence remained in the area. The foederati and Visigothic and Hunnic barbarians caused trouble, and the situation in Pannonia was described by Claudian as "a continual siege" in 399. Pannonia Prima held out under Generidus, but was eventually assimilated into the Huns' territory by 427. Rome would never regain effective control of this area, but it nominally remained a Roman province, until the fall of the Ostrogothic Kingdom in 553.

== See also ==
- March of Pannonia

== Literature ==
- Mócsy, András (2014) [1974]. Pannonia and Upper Moesia: A History of the Middle Danube Provinces of the Roman Empire. New York: Routledge.
- Várady, László (1969). Das Letzte Jahrhundert Pannoniens (376–476). Amsterdam: Verlag Adolf M. Hakkert.
- Wozniak, Frank E. (1981). "East Rome, Ravenna and Western Illyricum: 454-536 A.D." Historia: Zeitschrift für Alte Geschichte. 30 (3): 351–382.
