= Domnus of Pannonia =

Domnus (or Domnio) was the metropolitan bishop of Sirmium early in the fourth century. He probably succeeded Irenaeus, the first known bishop of Sirmium, who was martyred in 304. He was deposed after 325 and before 337. By 343 he was dead.

Domnus was one of just five bishops from the Latin-speaking western half of the Roman Empire known to have attended the First Council of Nicaea in 325. He is mentioned in the lists of signatories to the canons and the Nicene Creed as Domnus Pannoniae (Domnus of Pannonia), Domnus Pannoniensis (the Pannonian) or Domnus metropolitanus (the metropolitan), without mention of a see. Similarly, when Domnus' successor at Sirmium, Eutherius, attended the Council of Serdica in 343, the lists named him only as a Pannoniis (from Pannonia). Since Sirmium was the capital of the province of Pannonia Secunda at the time and the largest and richest city in all of Pannonia, it is likely that it was the metropolis of the church there and it was understood that the Domnus and Eutherius represented their entire province.

Towards the end of the reign of Constantine I around the time of the First Council of Tyre in 335, Domnus was the victim of the anti-Nicene reaction that took hold in Pannonia. According to Athanasius of Alexandria's History of the Arians, Domnus was deposed, forced into exile and replaced because he "hated the [Arian] heresy". It is only Athanasius' contemporary reference to Domnus Sirmii that allows the bishop of Sirmium and the Nicene bishop to be connected. It is possible, however, reconstruct a nearly complete list of Catholic and Arian bishops of Sirmium for the fourth century.

Older works sometimes refer to Domnus of Pannonia as "Domnus of Stridon" (Domnus Stridonensis). This is an error. The village of Stridon, birthplace of Saint Jerome, did not have bishops. Rather, in some lists of Nicene signatories the name preceding that of Domnus, Budius Stobiensis (bishop of Stobi), has been corrupted to Stribon(ensis) and then mistakenly applied to Domnus, being hypercorrected in the process to Stridon(ensis). This error appears in the Illyricum sacrum (1751) and in Giovanni Domenico Mansi's Sacrorum Conciliorum nova et amplissima collectio (1758–98).
