= Donji Petrovci =

Donji Petrovci Доњи Петровци (Serbian)
- Village (Selo)
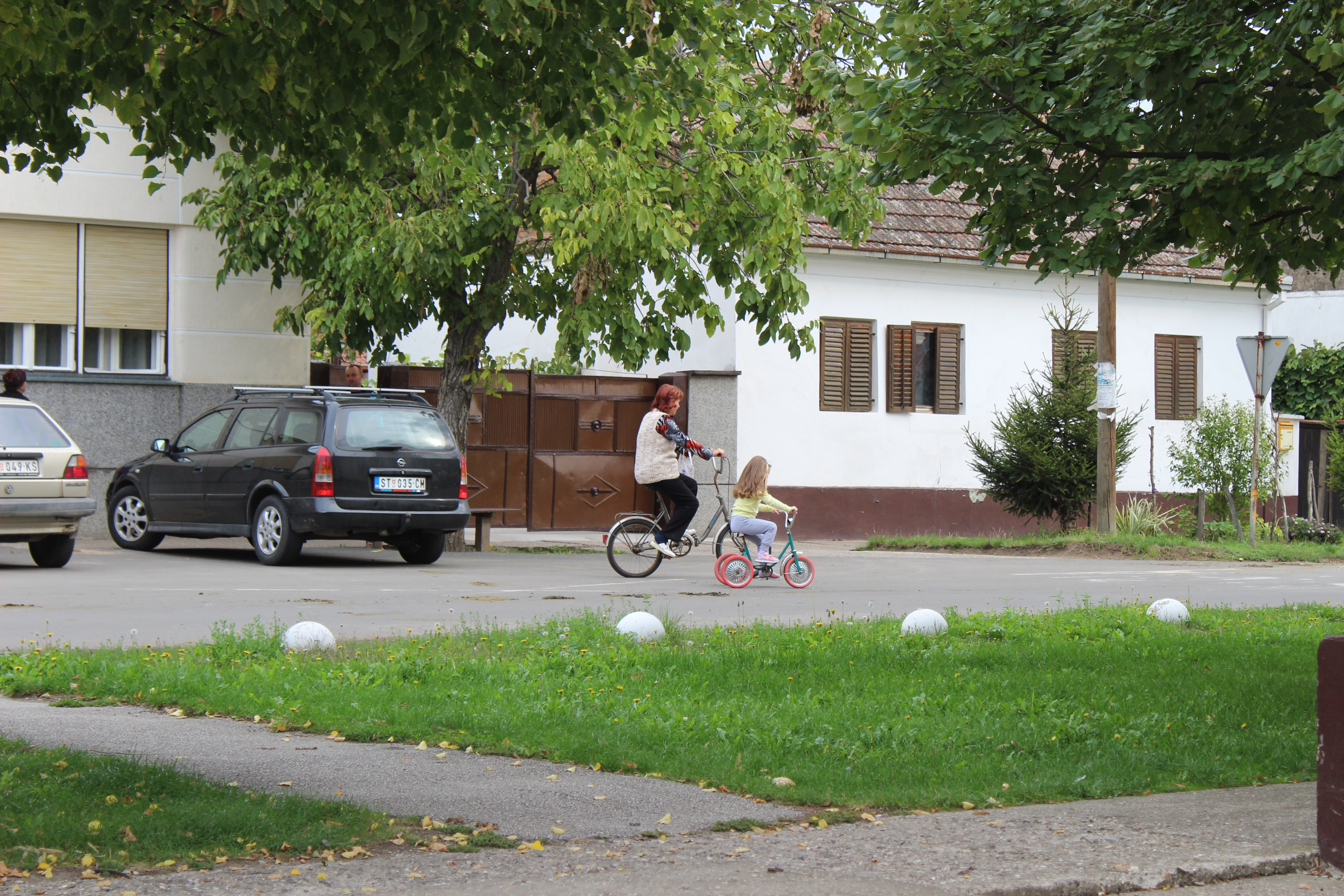

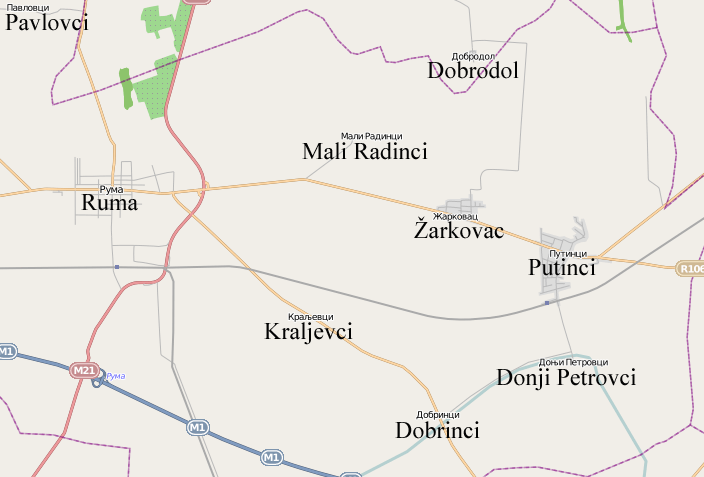

- Location within Vojvodina Location within Serbia Location within Europe
- Coordinates: 44°58′N 19°59′E
- Country: Serbia
- Province: Vojvodina
- Region: Syrmia
- District: Srem
- Municipality: Ruma

Population (2002)
  - Total: 991
- Time zone: UTC+1 (CET)
  - Summer (DST): UTC+2 (CEST)

Donji Petrovci (Serbian Cyrillic: Доњи Петровци) is a village in Serbia. It is situated in Ruma municipality, Srem District, Vojvodina province. The village has a Serb ethnic majority and a population of 991 people (2002 census). There is a significant ancient Roman archaeological site near the village - the remains of large city Bassianae, which in the 3rd century had the highest status of colonia.

== Name ==
In Serbian the village is known as Donji Petrovci (Доњи Петровци) or sometimes simply Petrovci (Петровци); in Croatian as Donji Petrovci; and in Hungarian as Petrovcze. The name of the town in Serbian is plural.

== History ==
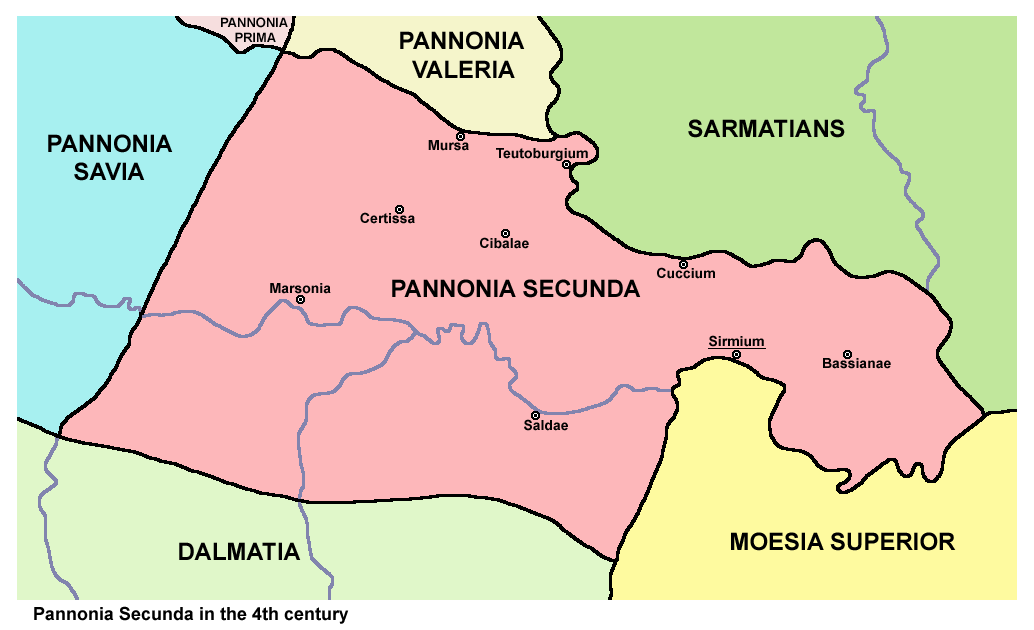
Map of Pannonia Secunda province with major towns, including Bassianae

In ancient times, an important Roman town known as Bassianae existed at this location. Today only small amount of this ancient settlement have been preserved. Bassianae was founded as an autonomous civitas in the 1st century and existed until the 6th century. It obtained the municipium status in 124 AD, while in 214 AD it was recorded as a colony. Initially, the town was part of Pannonia province, but due to the subsequent divisions of this province, Bassianae was included into Pannonia Inferior (2nd century) and later into Pannonia Secunda (3rd century). Bassianae was devastated during Barbarian invasions in the 5th-6th century.

Modern village of Donji Petrovci was mentioned first under this name in 1520, during administration of medieval Kingdom of Hungary. Since 1526, the village is part of the Ottoman Empire and from 1527 to 1530 it belonged to vassal Serb duchy in Syrmia, ruled by Radoslav Čelnik. Later, the village was included into Ottoman Sanjak of Syrmia, which was part of the Budin Eyalet.

Following the Treaty of Passarowitz from 1718, the village was transferred from Ottoman Empire to Habsburg monarchy. Until 1745, the village was under military administration, and since 1745, it was part of the Syrmia County of the Habsburg Kingdom of Slavonia (this kingdom was administratively part of both, the Habsburg Kingdom of Croatia and the Habsburg Kingdom of Hungary). In 1828, village was mainly populated by Orthodox Christians. In 1848–1849, the village was part of autonomous Serbian Vojvodina and from 1849 to 1860 it was part of the Voivodeship of Serbia and Banat of Temeschwar, which was a separate Habsburg crownland. After abolishment of the voivodeship in 1860, the village was again included into Syrmia County of the Kingdom of Slavonia (in this time, Kingdom of Slavonia was completely separate Habsburg crownland). Following the Croatian–Hungarian Settlement from 1868, the Kingdom of Slavonia and the Kingdom of Croatia were joined into newly formed Kingdom of Croatia-Slavonia, which administratively was part of the Kingdom of Hungary and Austria-Hungary. In 1910, the village had Serb ethnic majority and Hungarian minority.

Following the collapse of Austria-Hungary in 1918, the village firstly became part of the State of Slovenes, Croats and Serbs, then part of the Kingdom of Serbia, and finally part of the Kingdom of Serbs, Croats and Slovenes (later renamed to Yugoslavia). From 1918 to 1922, the village was part of the Syrmia County, from 1922 to 1929 part of the Syrmia Oblast, and from 1929 to 1941 part of Danube Banovina. From 1941 to 1944, the village was occupied by Axis troops and was attached to the Pavelić's Independent State of Croatia. In 1944, Soviet Red Army and Yugoslav partisans expelled Axis troops from the region and village was included into Autonomous Province of Vojvodina within new socialist Yugoslavia. Since 1945, Vojvodina is part of the People's Republic of Serbia within Yugoslavia.

== Demographics ==
=== Ethnic groups ===
In 2002, population of the village included:

- Serbs = 902
- Romani = 55
- others = 34

=== Historical population ===
- 1961: 1,015
- 1971: 944
- 1981: 842
- 1991: 843
- 2002: 991

== See also ==
- Archaeological Sites of Exceptional Importance
- List of places in Serbia
- List of cities, towns and villages in Vojvodina
