= Sirmium =

Roman and Byzantine city in Pannonia

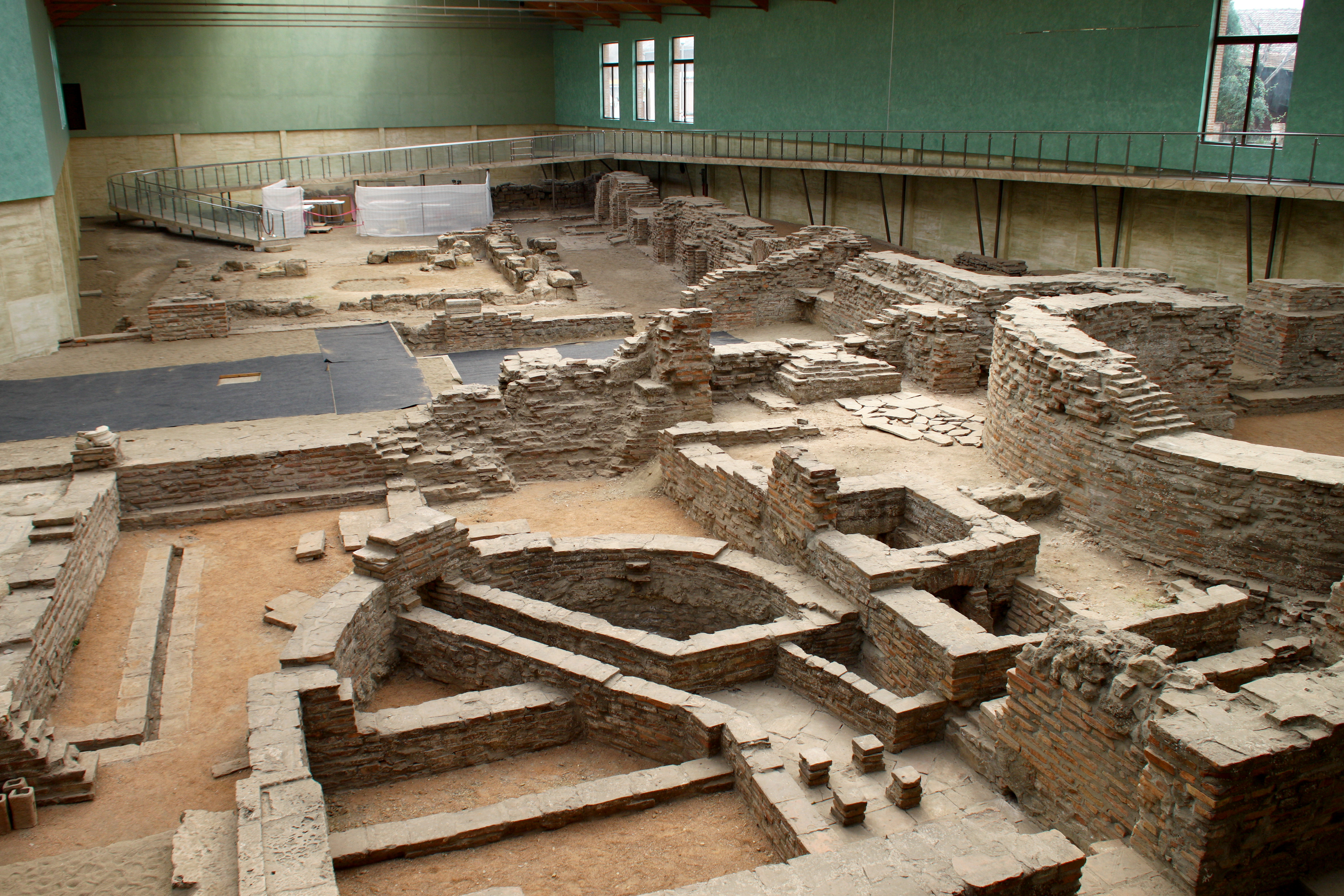
- Ruins of Imperial Palace at Sirmium

- Location within Serbia
- 44°57′58″N 19°36′38″E
- Type: Settlement
- Cultures: Illyrian, Celt, Roman, Byzantine
- Location: Modern-day Serbia (Sremska Mitrovica)
- Region: Pannonia

History
- Built: Before 4th century BC
- Abandoned: 582

Site notes
- Condition: In ruins
- Public access: Yes

Cultural Heritage of Serbia
- Type: Archaeological Site of Exceptional Importance
- Designated: 1948
- Reference no.: АН 106

Sirmium was a city in the Roman province of Pannonia, located on the Sava river, on the site of modern Sremska Mitrovica in the Vojvodina autonomous province of Serbia. First mentioned in the 4th century BC and originally inhabited by Illyrians and Celts, it was conquered by the Romans in the 1st century BC and subsequently became the capital of the Roman province of Pannonia Inferior. In 293 AD, Sirmium was proclaimed one of the four capitals of the Roman Empire. It was also the capital of the Praetorian prefecture of Illyricum and of Pannonia Secunda. The site is protected as an archaeological Site of Exceptional Importance. The modern region of Syrmia (Srem or Srijem) was named after the city.

Sirmium purportedly had 100,000 inhabitants and was one of the largest cities of its time. Colin McEvedy, whose estimates for ancient cities are much lower than the general consensus, put the population at only 7,000, based on the size of the archaeological site. The amount of grain imported between 1 AD and 400 AD was enough to feed 700,000 to 1 million people.

== History ==
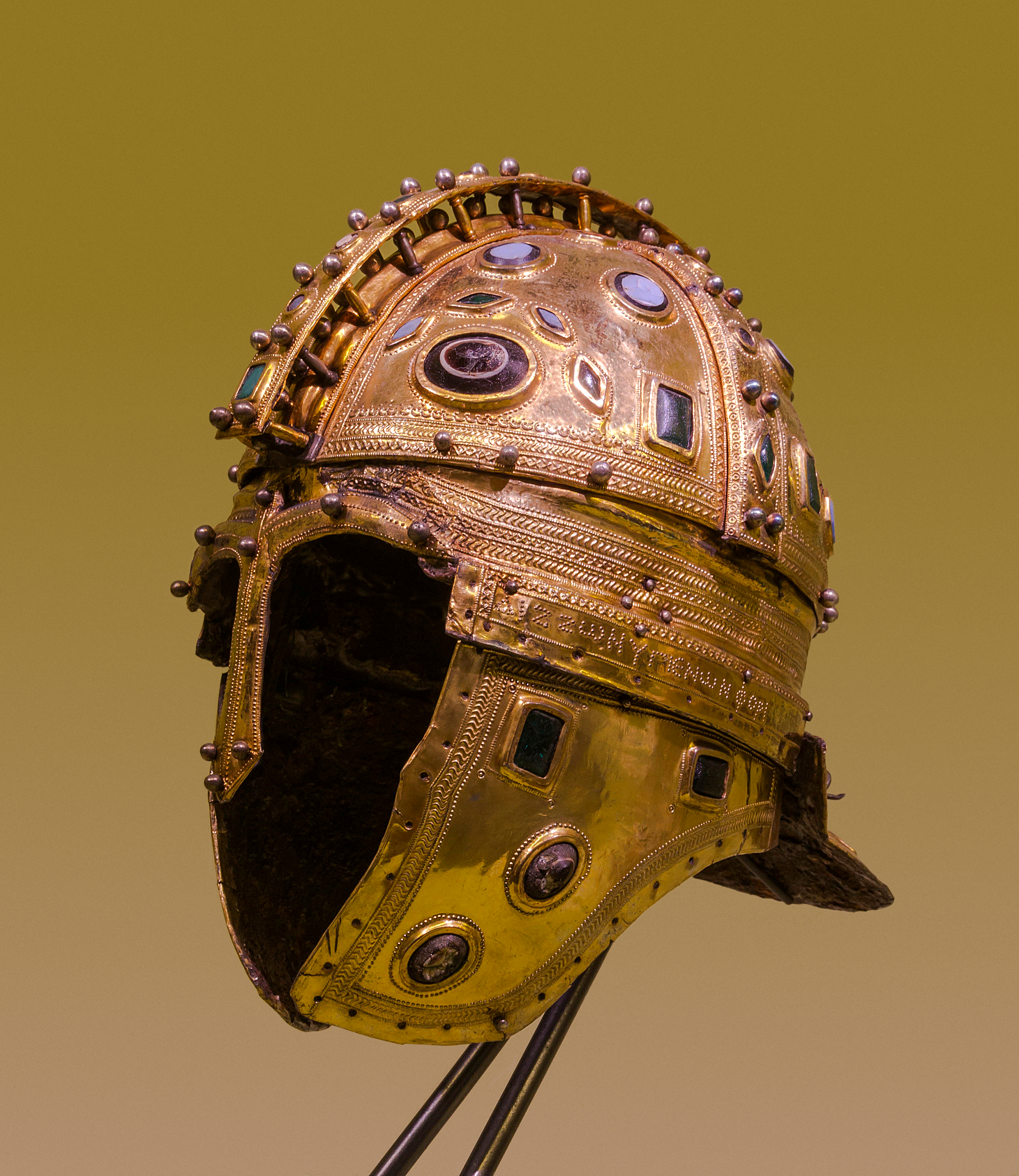
Golden Roman helmet found near Sirmium; it has been exhibited in the Museum of Vojvodina in Novi Sad.

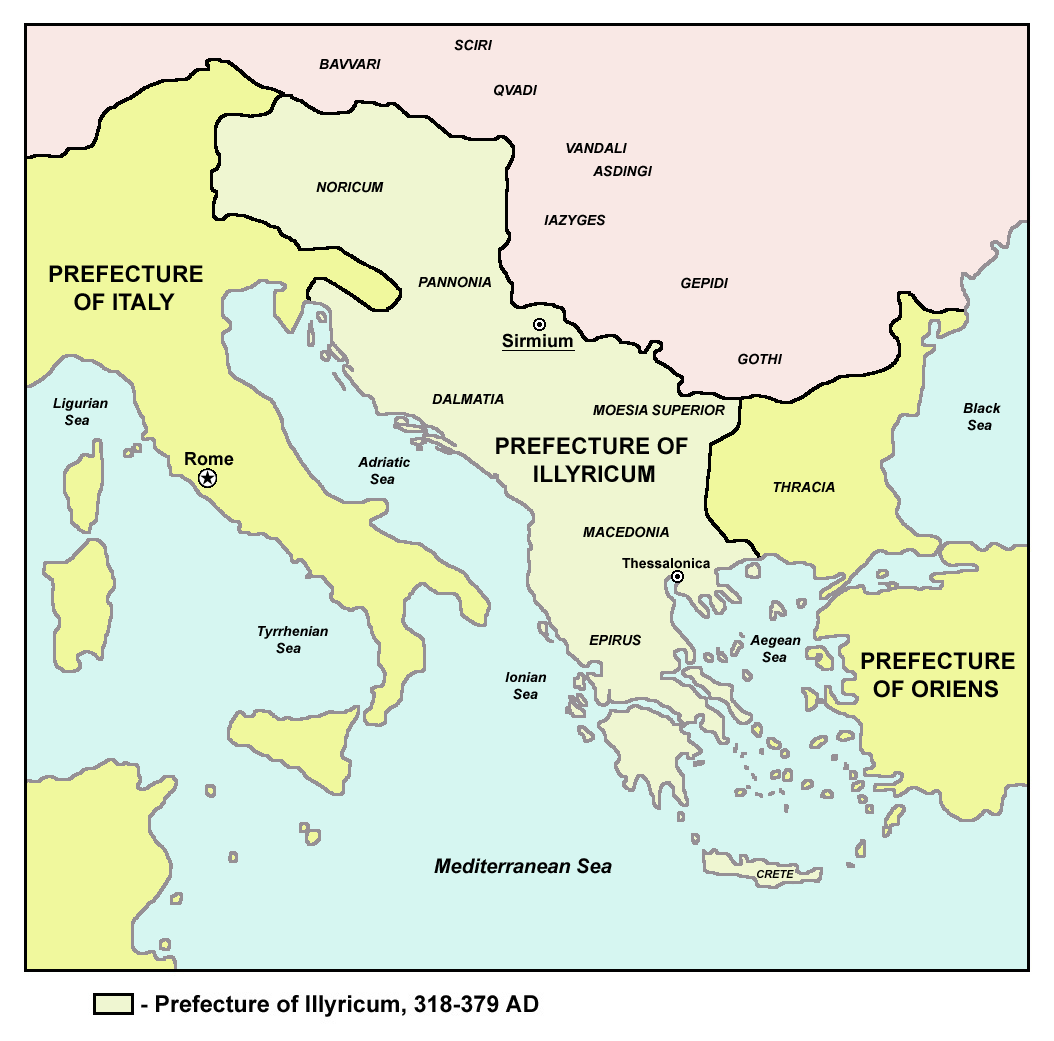
Map of the praetorian prefecture of Illyricum, 318–79, with its capital in Sirmium.

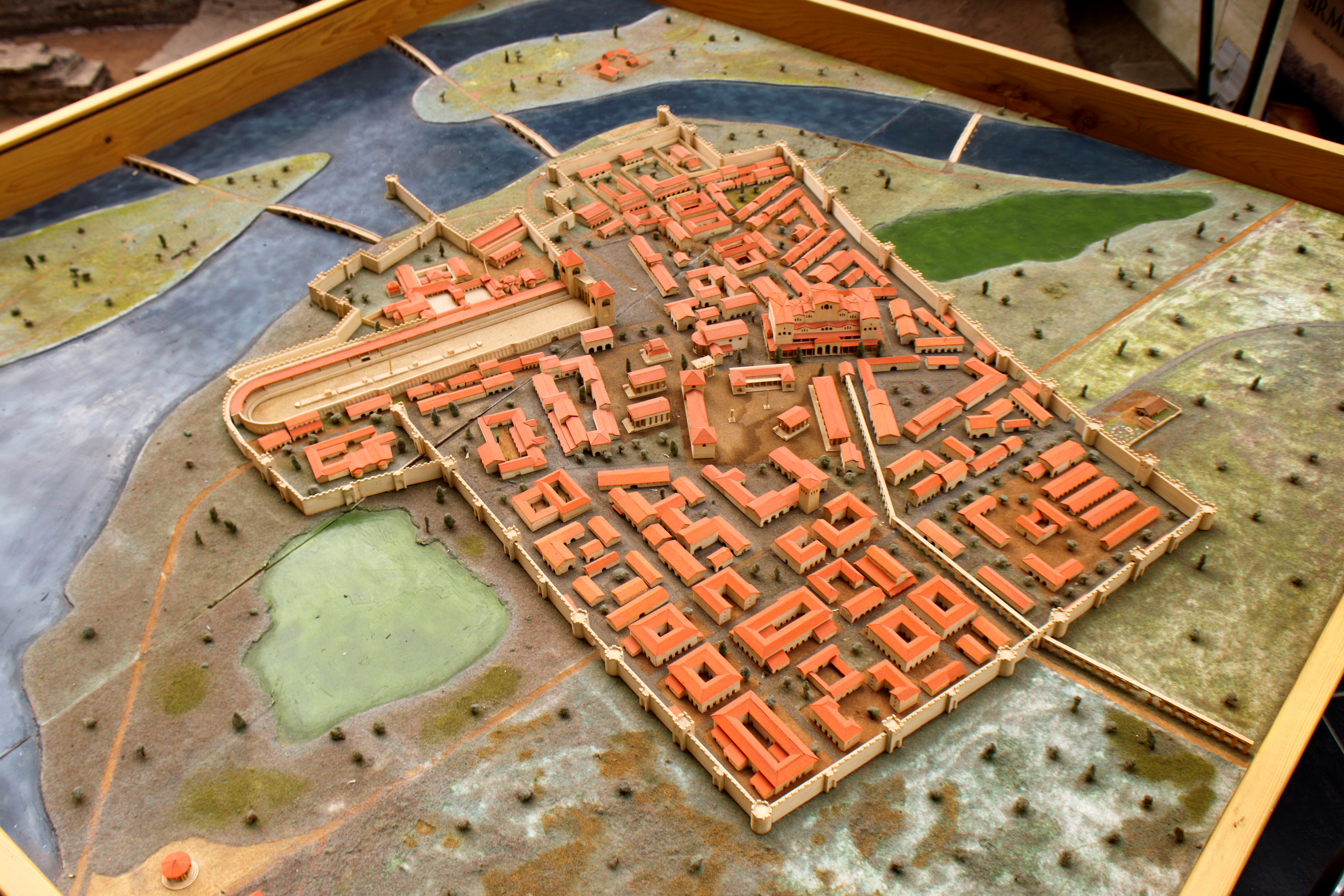
A scale model of Sirmium in the Visitors Center in Sremska Mitrovica.

Remains of Sirmium stand on the site of the modern-day Sremska Mitrovica, 55 km (34 mi) west of Belgrade (Roman Singidunum). It was located 30 km (19 mi) west of Bassianae and 145 km (90 mi) of Viminacium, 35 km (22 mi) southwest of Cusum, 35 km (22 mi) southeast of Cuccium and 70 km (43 mi) southwest of Cibalae. Archaeologists have found traces of organized human life on the site of Sirmium dating from 5,000 BCE. The city was first mentioned in the 4th century BC and was originally inhabited by the Illyrians and Celts (by the Pannonian-Illyrian Amantini and the Celtic Scordisci). The Triballi king Syrmus was later considered the eponymous founder of Sirmium, but the roots are different, and the two words only became conflated later. The name Sirmium by itself means "flow, flowing water, wetland", referring to its close river position on the nearby Sava.

With the Celtic tribe of Scordisci as allies, the Roman proconsul Marcus Vinicius took Sirmium in around 14 BC. In the 1st century AD, Sirmium gained the status of a Roman colony, and became an important military and strategic center of the Pannonia province. The Roman emperors Trajan, Marcus Aurelius, and Claudius II prepared war expeditions in Sirmium.

In 103, Pannonia was split into two provinces: Pannonia Superior and Pannonia Inferior; Sirmium became the capital city of the latter.

In 296, Diocletian reorganized Pannonia into four provinces: Pannonia Prima, Pannonia Valeria, Pannonia Savia and Pannonia Secunda, with Sirmium becoming the capital of Pannonia Secunda. He joined them with Noricum and Dalmatia to establish the Diocese of Pannonia, with Sirmium as its capital also.

In 293, with the establishment of the Tetrarchy, the Roman Empire was split into four parts; Sirmium emerged as one of the four capital cities (along with Trier, Mediolanum, and Nicomedia), and was the capital of emperor Galerius. With the establishment of Praetorian prefectures in 318, the capital of the prefecture of Illyricum was Sirmium, remaining so until 379, when the westernmost Diocese of Illyricum, Pannonia (including Sirmium), was detached and joined to the prefecture of Italia assuming the name of Diocese of Illyricum. The eastern part of Illyricum remained a separate prefecture under the East Roman (Byzantine) Empire with its new capital in Thessalonica.

The city also had an imperial palace, a horse-racing arena, a mint, an arena theatre, and a theatre, as well as many workshops, public baths, temples, public palaces, and luxury villas. Ancient historian Ammianus Marcellinus called it "the glorious mother of cities". The mint in Sirmium was connected with the mint in Salona and silver mines in the Dinaric Alps through the Via Argentaria.

At the end of the 4th century, Sirmium came under the sway of the Goths, and later, was again annexed to the East Roman Empire. In 441 the Huns conquered Sirmium; for more than a century it was held by various other tribes, such as the Ostrogoths and Gepids. In 504, Ostrogothic Count Pitzas under Theoderic the Great took Sirmium. For a short time, Sirmium was the center of the Kingdom of the Gepids, and king Cunimund (r. c. 560 – 567) minted gold coins there. After 567, Sirmium was returned to the East Roman Empire. The Pannonian Avars conquered and destroyed the city in 582.

The city was also the location of the Battle of Sirmium that took place in 1167, where a Roman army dispatched by Manuel I Komnenos decisively defeated the forces of Hungary, turning the latter into a satellite state.

== Roman emperors ==
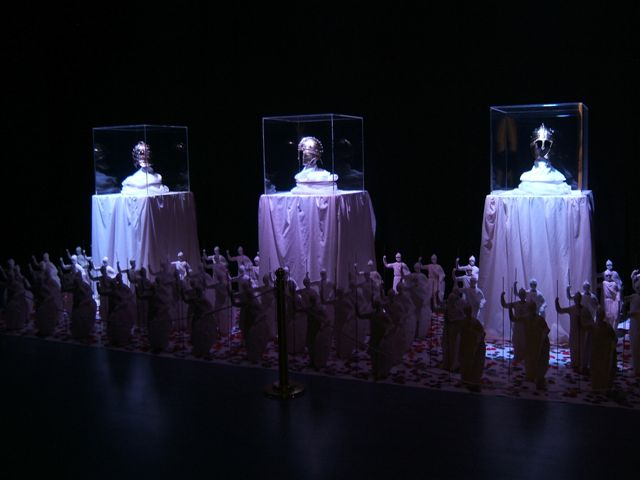
Three golden helmets found near Sirmium, displayed, with a "guard" of 80 statuettes of Roman legionnaires, in the Museum of Vojvodina in Novi Sad

Ten Roman emperors were born in this city or in its surroundings: Herennius Etruscus (251), Hostilian (251), Decius (249–251), Claudius II (268–270), Quintillus (270), Aurelian (270–275), Probus (276–282), Maximian (285–310), Constantius II (337–361), and Gratian (367–383).

The last emperor of the united Roman Empire, Theodosius I (378–395), became emperor in Sirmium. The usurpers Ingenuus and Regalianus also declared themselves emperors in this city (in 260) and many other Roman emperors spent some time in Sirmium, including Marcus Aurelius, who might have written parts of his famous work Meditations in the city. According to Tertullian Sirmium was also the site of the death of Marcus Aurelius, of smallpox, in March of 180 CE, although the historian Aurelius Victor recounts that Marcus Aurelius died in Vindobona (province of Pannonia Superior, modern Vienna in Austria).

== Christian bishopric ==
The city had a Christian community by the third century. By the end of the century, it had a bishop, who was probably the metropolitan of all the Pannonian bishops. The first known bishop was Irenaeus, who was martyred during the Diocletianic Persecution in 304. For the next century, the sequence of bishops is known, but in the fifth and sixth centuries, the see falls into obscurity. An unnamed bishop is mentioned in 448. The last known bishop is mentioned in a papal letter of 594, after which the city itself is rarely mentioned and the see probably went into abeyance.

From the time of the first synod of Tyre in 335, Sirmium became a stronghold of the Arian movement and a site of much controversy. Between 347 and 358 there were four synods held in Sirmium. A fifth took place in 375 or 378. All dealt with the Arian controversy.

== Archaeological findings ==
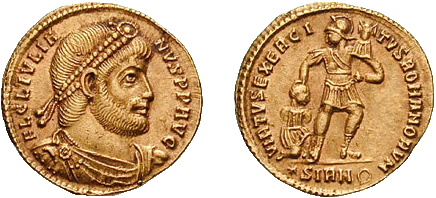
Julian solidus, c. 361, from Sirmium mint

At Glac near Sirmium a palace is being excavated, indicated by the luxurious construction materials coming from all over the Mediterranean, such as red and green porphyry from Egypt and the Peloponnese, and marble from Tunisia, Greece and Italy. Some say it is that of Emperor Maximian and according to Aurelius Victor built on the place where his parents worked as laborers on the estate.

During the construction of the hospital in 1971, more than eighty altars were found in a monumental sanctuary to Jupiter, which is the second largest in Europe. Sirmium had two bridges that bridged the river Sava, Ad Basanti, and Artemida's bridges according to historical sources. After 313 Sirmium became an important Christian center. So far revealed are eight early Christian churches dedicated to St. Irenaeus, St. Demetrius, and St. Sinenot.

During work on the new Sremska Mitrovica trade center in 1972, a worker accidentally broke into an old Roman pot, about 2m deep, over the site of an old Sirmium settlement. 33 gold Roman coins enclosed in a leather pouch were found inside a Roman house wall, probably the hidden savings of a wealthy Roman family stashed centuries ago. Of this extraordinary rare find of Sirmium minted coins were 4 Constantius II era coins, considered the most valuable examples from the late Roman Empire of the fourth century AD. Ironically, the worker's name was Zlatenko (meaning 'golden' or 'golden man' in Serbian; Aurelius in Latin).

Sirmium also had a Roman Hippodrome. A colossal building about 150m wide and 450m long lies directly under the Sremska Mitrovica town center and just beside the old Sirmium Emperor's Palace (one of just a few Sirmium publicly accessible archaeological sites). The presence of the arena has clearly affected the layout of the present town (Sremska Mitrovica is today about 2–4m above the ground line of the former Sirmium settlement). Recently announced cultural and archaeological projects for preserving and popularising Sirmium sites haven't included any activity dealing with the arena, probably due to the extent of the large arena — the entire present town center might have to be excavated.

== Famous residents ==
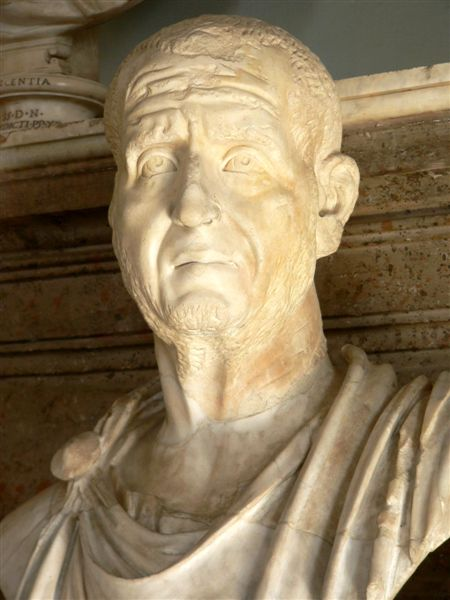
Traianus Decius, first romanized Illyrian that became Roman Emperor (249–51), born in the village Budalia near Sirmium

=== List of emperors ===
- Marcus Aurelius (161–180), used Sirmium as a residence in between Pannonian military campaigns (170–180)
- Maximinus (235–238), ruled from residence in Sirmium
- Decius (249–251), lived in Sirmium, where his two sons were born
- Herennius Etruscus (251), born in Sirmium
- Hostilian (251), born in Sirmium
- Ingenuus (260), proclaimed himself emperor in Sirmium
- Regalianus (260), proclaimed himself emperor in Sirmium
- Claudius II (268–270), born in Sirmium and spent most of his life there
- Quintillus (270), born in Sirmium
- Aurelian (270–275), born in Sirmium and also proclaimed emperor there
- Probus (276–282), born in Sirmium
- Maximian (285–310), born near Sirmium
- Galerius (305–311), ruled as Caesar from Sirmium (293–296)
- Crispus, proclaimed Caesar in Sirmium in 317
- Constantine II, proclaimed Caesar in Sirmium in 317
- Vetranio, proclaimed himself emperor in Sirmium in 350
- Constantius II (337–361), born in Sirmium
- Gratian (367–383), born in Sirmium
- Theodosius I the Great (378–395), became emperor in Sirmium

=== List of prefects ===
- Licinius, prefect of the Diocese of Pannonia with residence in Sirmium (308–314)
- Apricanus, prefect of Pannonia Secunda with residence in Sirmium (355)
- Mesala, prefect of the Pannonia Secunda province (373)
- Petronius Probus, prefect in Sirmium (374)
- Aurelius Victor, prefect of the Pannonia Secunda province (369), and author of a History of Rome until the reign of Julian
- Leontius, prefect in Sirmium (426)

=== List of bishops ===
- Irenaeus (died 304)
- Domnus (deposed c. 335), attended the First Council of Nicaea
- Eutherius (fl. 347)
- Photinus (c. 345–351), Arian bishop
- Germinius (351–c. 376)
- Anemius (c. 376–c. 392)
- Cornelius (c. 392 – after 404)
- Laurentius (in 401–17)
- Sebastianus (fl. 594)

=== List of saints ===
- Anastasia of Sirmium
- Fausta of Sirmium

== Sources ==
- Curta, Florin (2001). "Limes and Cross: the Religious Dimension of the Sixth-century Danube Frontier of the Early Byzantine Empire". Старинар. 51: 45–70.
- Curta, Florin (2001). The Making of the Slavs: History and Archaeology of the Lower Danube Region, c. 500–700. Cambridge: Cambridge University Press. ISBN 9781139428880.
- Curta, Florin (2006). Southeastern Europe in the Middle Ages, 500–1250. Cambridge: Cambridge University Press.
- Daim, Falko (2019). "The Longobards in Pannonia". Prima e dopo Alboino: sulle tracce dei Longobardi. Napoli: Guida. pp. 221–241.
- Given, John (2014). The Fragmentary History of Priscus. Merchantville, New Jersey: Evolution Publishing. ISBN 9781935228141.
- Gračanin, Hrvoje (2006). "The Huns and South Pannonia". Byzantinoslavica. 64: 29–76.
- Janković, Đorđe (2004). "The Slavs in the 6th Century North Illyricum". Гласник Српског археолошког друштва. 20: 39–61.
- Kazhdan, Alexander (1991). "Sirmium". The Oxford Dictionary of Byzantium. Vol. 3. New York: Oxford University Press. p. 1906. ISBN 978-0-19-504652-6.
- Kuzmanović, Zorica; Mihajlović, Vladimir D. (2015). "Roman Emperors and Identity Constructions in Modern Serbia". Identities: Global Studies in Culture and Power. 22 (4): 416–432.
- Милошевић, Петар (2001). Археологија и историја Сирмијума. Нови Сад: Матица српска.
- Mirković, Miroslava B. (2017). Sirmium: Its History from the First Century AD to 582 AD. Novi Sad: Center for Historical Research.
- Mócsy, András (2014) [1974]. Pannonia and Upper Moesia: A History of the Middle Danube Provinces of the Roman Empire. New York: Routledge. ISBN 9781317754251.
- Papazoglu, Fanula (1978). The Central Balkan Tribes in pre-Roman Times: Triballi, Autariatae, Dardanians, Scordisci and Moesians. Amsterdam: Hakkert. ISBN 9789025607937.
- Popović, Radomir V. (1996). Le Christianisme sur le sol de l'Illyricum oriental jusqu'à l'arrivée des Slaves. Thessaloniki: Institute for Balkan Studies. ISBN 9789607387103.
- Várady, László (1969). Das Letzte Jahrhundert Pannoniens (376–476). Amsterdam: Verlag Adolf M. Hakkert.
- Whitby, Michael (1988). The Emperor Maurice and his Historian: Theophylact Simocatta on Persian and Balkan warfare. Oxford: Clarendon Press. ISBN 978-0-19-822945-2.
- Wozniak, Frank E. (1981). "East Rome, Ravenna and Western Illyricum: 454-536 A.D." Historia: Zeitschrift für Alte Geschichte. 30 (3): 351–382.
- Zeiller, Jacques (1918). Les origines chrétiennes dans les provinces danubiennes de l'Empire romain. Paris: E. De Boccard.
