= Stridon =

Town in Dalmatia, Rome

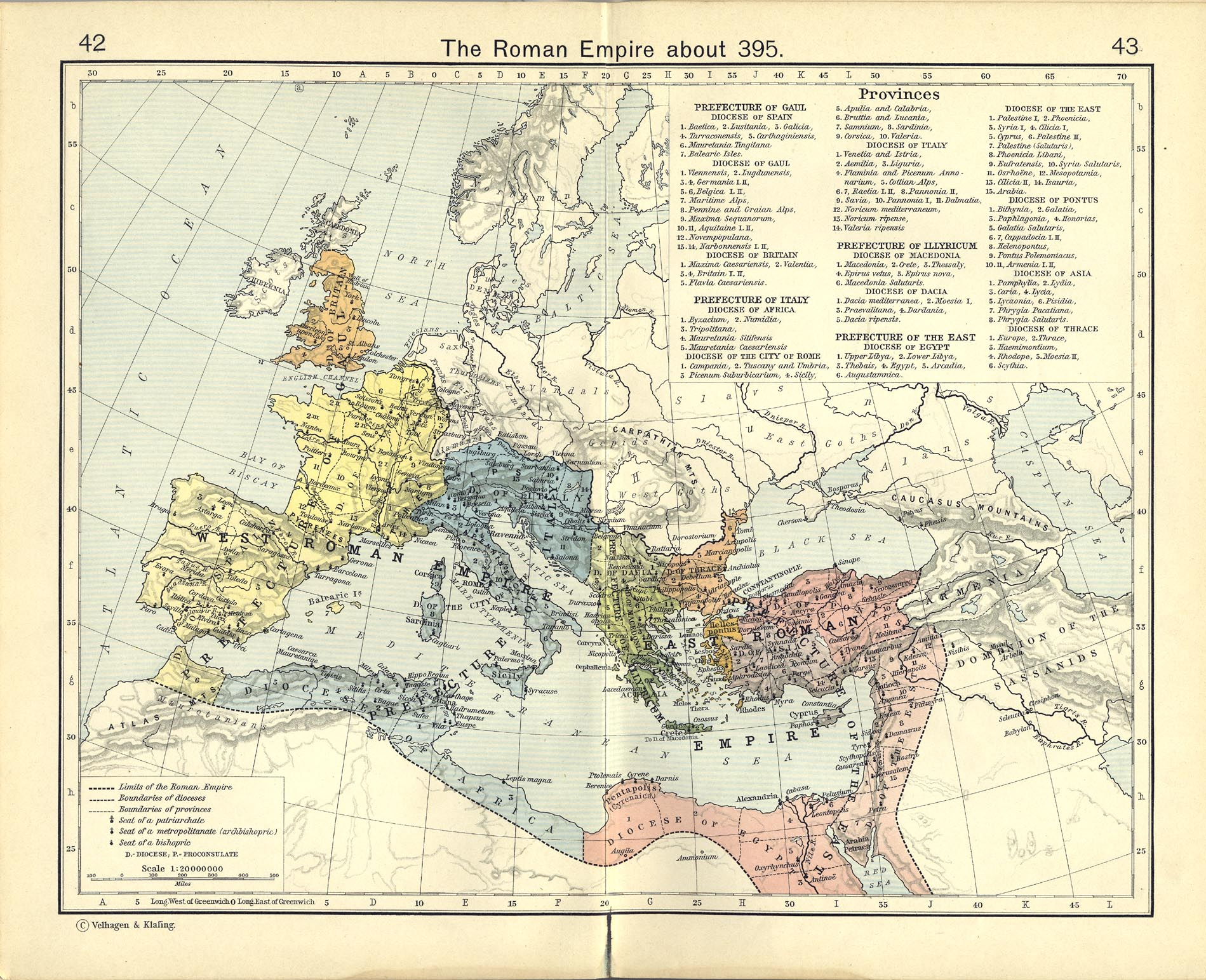
The Stridon bishopric seat in the Roman province Dalmatia (in today's Bosnia) on a map of the Roman Empire about 395 AD, from Historical Atlas (1911) by William R. Shepherd

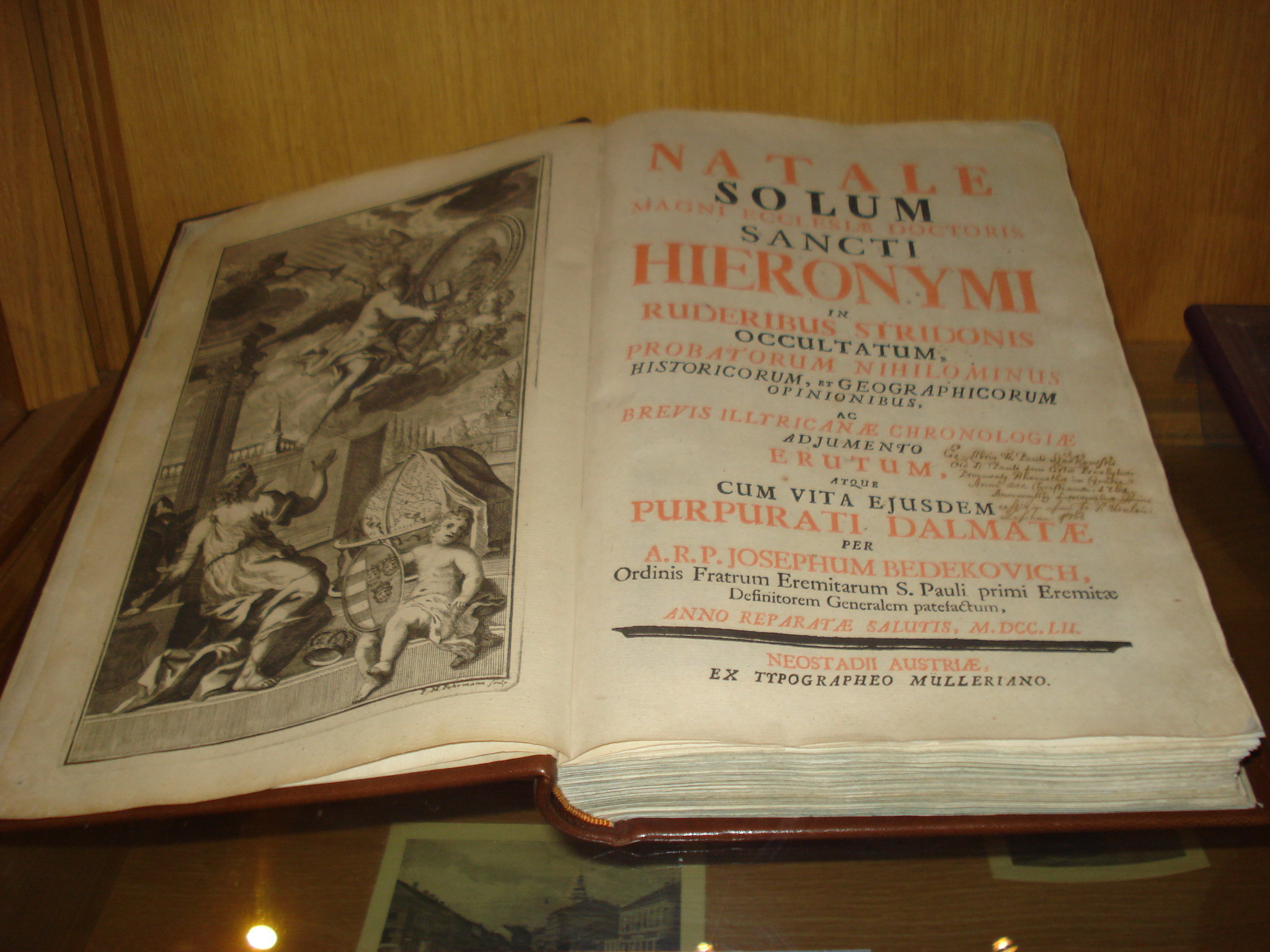
In this 1752 book titled Natale solum magni ecclesiae doctoris sancti Hieronymi in ruderibus Stridonis occultatum ("Birthplace of Saint Jerome."), Croatian Pauline Josip Bedeković Komorski of the Sveta Jelena monastery refers to Štrigova in Međimurje County as the birthplace of Saint Jerome.

Stridon (Latin: Strido Dalmatiae) was a town in the Roman province of Dalmatia, of unknown location, best known as the birthplace of Saint Jerome. In 379, the town was destroyed by the Goths. Jerome wrote about it in his work De Viris Illustribus: "Jerome was born to his father Eusebius, [in the] town of Strido, which the Goths overthrew, and was once at the border between Dalmatia and Pannonia." ("Hieronymus patre Eusebio natus, oppido Stridonis, quod a Gothis eversum, Dalmatiae quondam Pannoniaeque confinium fuit...").

== Location ==
The exact location of Stridon is unknown. It is possible Stridon was located either in modern Croatia or Slovenia. Possible locations are the vicinity of Ljubljana, Starod (Slovenia), Sdrin, Štrigova, Zrenj, Zrin (Croatia) and many others in both countries. However, according to other sources, such as Frane Bulić in his work Stridon (Grahovopolje u Bosni) rodno mjesto Svetoga Jeronima: rasprava povjesno-geografska (1920) and the geographical map of the Roman Empire in 395 AD from Historical Atlas (1911) by William R. Shepherd, Stridon, which was the seat of a bishopric, is placed at 44.2N, 17.7E, in today's Bosnia and Herzegovina, in Grahovsko Polje, near the town of Grahovo.

== Notable people ==
Other than Saint Jerome, the priest Lupicinus of Stridon came from Stridon. Domnus of Pannonia, a bishop who took part in the First Council of Nicaea, is often said to have come from or been bishop of Stridon or, more likely, the bishop of Sirmium.
