= Bassianae =

Ancient Roman town

Coordinates: 44°58′15″N 19°58′44″E

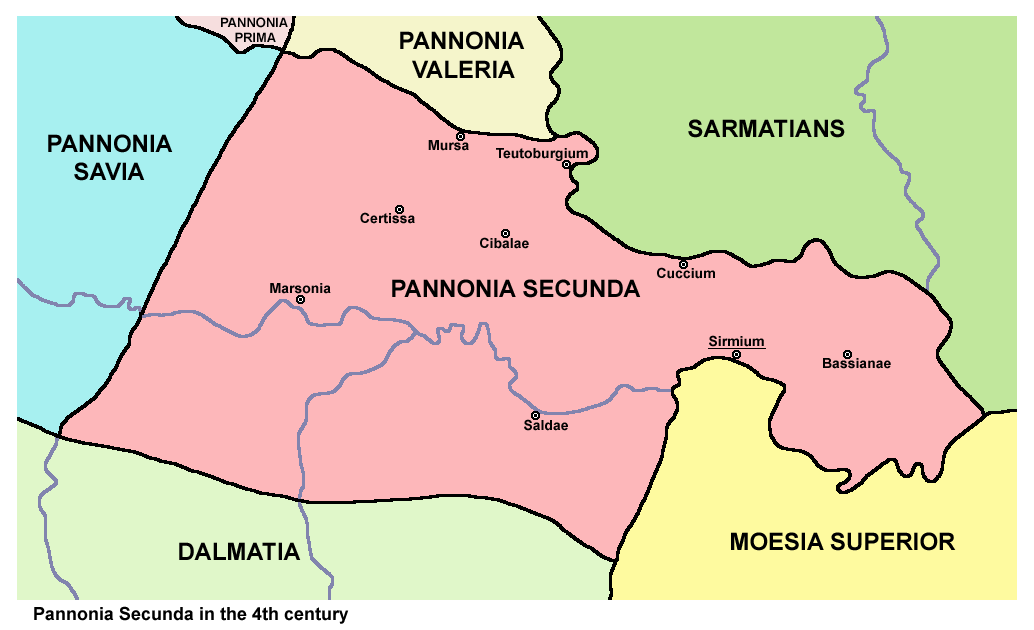
Map of Pannonia Secunda province with major towns, including Bassianae

Bassianae or Bassiana (Serbian: Basijana or Басијана) was an important ancient Roman town in Pannonia (today Syrmia region in Vojvodina province, Serbia). It was located near present-day Donji Petrovci, a village in the Ruma municipality. Bassianae was the second largest town in Syrmia, after Sirmium. It was located on a road that connected Sirmium and Singidunum.

== History ==
Bassianae was founded as an autonomous civitas in the 1st century and existed until the 6th century. It obtained the municipium status in 124 AD, while in 214 AD it was recorded as a colony. Initially, the town was part of the province of Pannonia, but due to the subsequent divisions of this province, Bassianae was included into Pannonia Inferior (2nd century) and later into Pannonia Secunda (3rd century). It was one of the more important towns in the Pannonia province. During late Roman Empire, the town was a seat of one high official - procurator gynaecii Bassianensis Pannoniae secundae. In the 4th century it had a gynaecia (Imperial woolen mill, showing the importance of the town) and was a seat of the Christian bishopric.

In the middle of the 5th century, the town was conquered by the Huns. In 468, Dengizich, the son of Attila, devastated Bassianae, but suffered a major defeat after trying to capture the town during the Hun-Ostrogoth Wars, Ostrogoth Valamir came out victorious. For several decades, the region was a scene of struggle between Huns, Ostrogoths, Gepids and Lombards. In 510 AD, the treaty between Eastern Roman Empire and Ostrogoths divided the Syrmia region between two countries, and the town of Bassianae was included in the Eastern Roman state. When Eastern Empire managed to capture Sirmium after the defeat of the Gepids, the new province of Pannonia with a seat in Sirmium was established and the town of Bassianae was included in that province. In the second half of the 6th century, the whole Syrmia region was conquered by the Avars.

== Archaeology ==
Today only a small amount of ancient town has been preserved. Archaeological excavations began in 1882 and were continued in 1935, when walls, towers, ceramics, coins, sculptures, and mosaics were found.
