= Marcus Cominius Secundus =

2nd century AD senator, suffect consul and governor

Marcus Cominius Secundus was a Roman senator, who was active during the reign of Marcus Aurelius. He was suffect consul in one of the later nundinia of 151 with Lucius Attidius Cornelianus as his colleague. He is known from inscriptions and military diplomas issued during his time.

Ronald Syme has observed that "Cominius looks Italian (of low degree, no consul of that name hitherto), but a provincial origin is not excluded, possibly Narbonensian."

Two offices in the imperial service are known for Secundus. The first was as legatus legionis or commander of Legio V Macedonica in Lower Moesia during the governorship of Lucius Minicius Natalis Quadronius Verus; this fell in the years 141 through 144. The second was immediately before his consulship, when Cominius Secundus was governor of the imperial province of Pannonia Inferior from around 147 to 150.

Political offices
Preceded by Sextus Quintilius Condianus, and Sextus Quintilius Valerius Maximus, then unknown as ordinary consuls	Suffect consul of the Roman Empire; 151 with Lucius Attidius Cornelianus	Succeeded by Gaius Curtius Justus, and Publius Julius Nauto as suffect consuls
