= Lucius Cornelius Latinianus =

2nd century Roman senator

Lucius Cornelius Latinianus was a Roman senator, who held at least two imperial appointments during the reign of Hadrian. Latinianus was suffect consul in an undetermined nundinium between the years 121 and 123. In 2002 Werner Eck and Peter Weiß suggested his tenure may have fallen in July-August 121; however, in a more recent article Eck with Manfred Clauss argued he was suffect consul with a previously unknown Gaius Velius Rufus at some point between July-December 120. Latinianus is known entirely from inscriptions.

There is also an equestrian Lucius Cornelius Latinianus, who was procurator in Moesia Inferior c. 105, and later procurator of Raetia in the years immediately before 116. When the inscriptions attesting to this earlier Latinianus were first recovered, it had been proposed that this was the same man, and he had been adlected into the Senate. More recently, Werner Eck has argued the equestrian was a different man from the senator, identifying the older Latinianus as the father of the younger.

Two offices of his cursus honorum are known. The earlier, which fell before his consulate, was governor of the imperial province of Pannonia Inferior; an unpublished military diploma attests he was in this office between February and April 119. The later, which was after his consulate, was another governorship, but of the imperial province of Pannonia Superior; another military diploma published in 2003 attests Latinianus was in office in 1 July 126.
