= Triccianus =

Usurper against Roman Emperor (c.218)

- Usurper of the Roman Empire
- Reign: circa 218 AD, during Elagabalus's rule
- Died: circa 218 AD

Aelius Decius Triccianus was a reputed Roman usurper, who revolted against Emperor Elagabalus. He revolted against Elagabalus using troops still loyal to Macrinus, the previous emperor who Elagabalus had overthrown, and who Triccianus had served under. The revolt was put down, and he was executed. A damnatio memoriae was issued against him, making it impossible to establish the date of his rebellion or death.

== History ==
Triccianus was first recorded as being doorkeeper to the legate of Pannonia, before rising to become the praefectus legionis (legionary commander) of Legio II Parthica under Caracalla. He became involved in a plot to usurp the throne from Caracalla, with Macrinus. When Macrinus successfully seized the throne, Triccianus was rewarded with the post of provincial governor of Pannonia Inferior. During his time as governor, he used his legio, II Parthica, to repair the military roads in the province. Numerous milestones bore his name, however all of these were later removed by order of Elagabalus, as part of the decree of Damnatio memoriae (literally "condemnation of memory") against him. It is recorded that he also became a senator by way of special adlection.

After the overthrowal of Macrinus by Elagabalus, Elagabalus proceeded to depose Macrinus' loyal followers. A partial list of those targeted by Elagabalus is given by Cassius Dio: Triccianus, Castinus, Valerianus Poetus, and Seius Carus. Triccianus' revolt was of political necessity, as Elagabalus was certain to avenge the death of Caracalla, whom Elagabalus had claimed was his father, albeit illegitimately, in order to legitimize his claim upon the throne. Triccianus' obligation to Macrinus, to avenge his overthrow at the hands of Elagabalus, likewise necessitated his action. Several legios, including Triccianus' former command of II Parthica, thought highly of Macrinus, and thus were available to Triccianus to use to stage his revolt. He was defeated and executed by Elagabalus, and then had a damnatio memoriae declared against him. Because of this damnatio memoriae, even the date of his death is impossible to firmly establish, as well as the date of his revolt. Contemporary sources do not mention if he actually claimed the title of emperor (augustus), and simply mention that he was executed for his murder of Caracalla.
