= Diocese of Pannonia =

Diocese of the late Roman Empire (314 - 440s)

Diocese of Pannonia Dioecesis Pannoniarum
- Diocese of the Roman Empire
- c. AD 314-440s
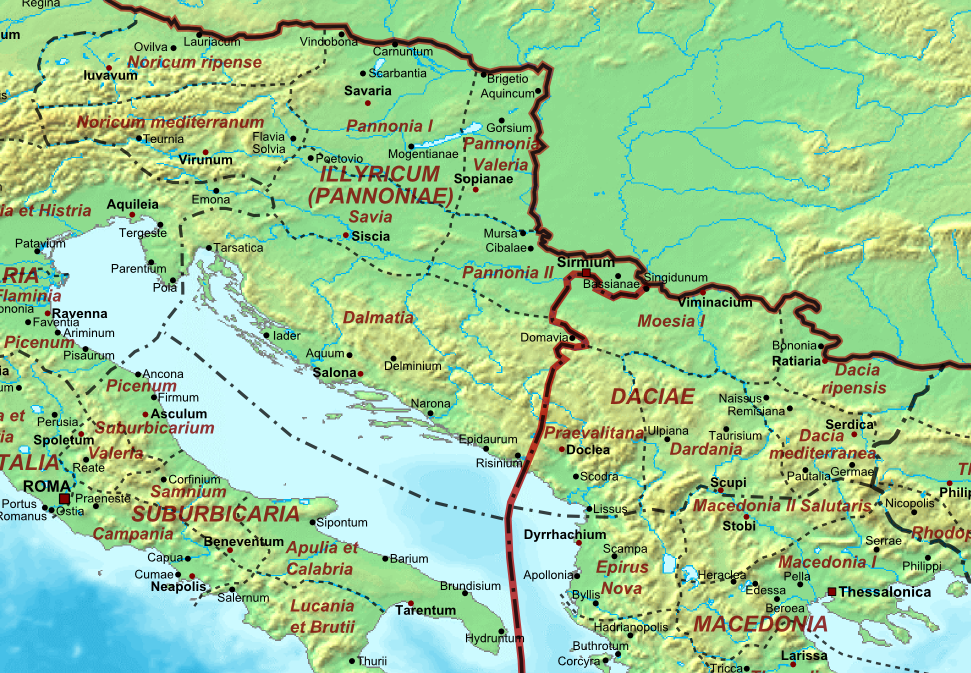
- Capital: Sirmium
- Area
  - Coordinates: 44°59′N 19°37′E
- Historical era: Late Antiquity
  - Established: c. AD 314
  - conquest by the Huns: c. AD 440s
- Today part of: Austria, Bosnia and Herzegovina, Croatia, Hungary, Serbia, Slovenia

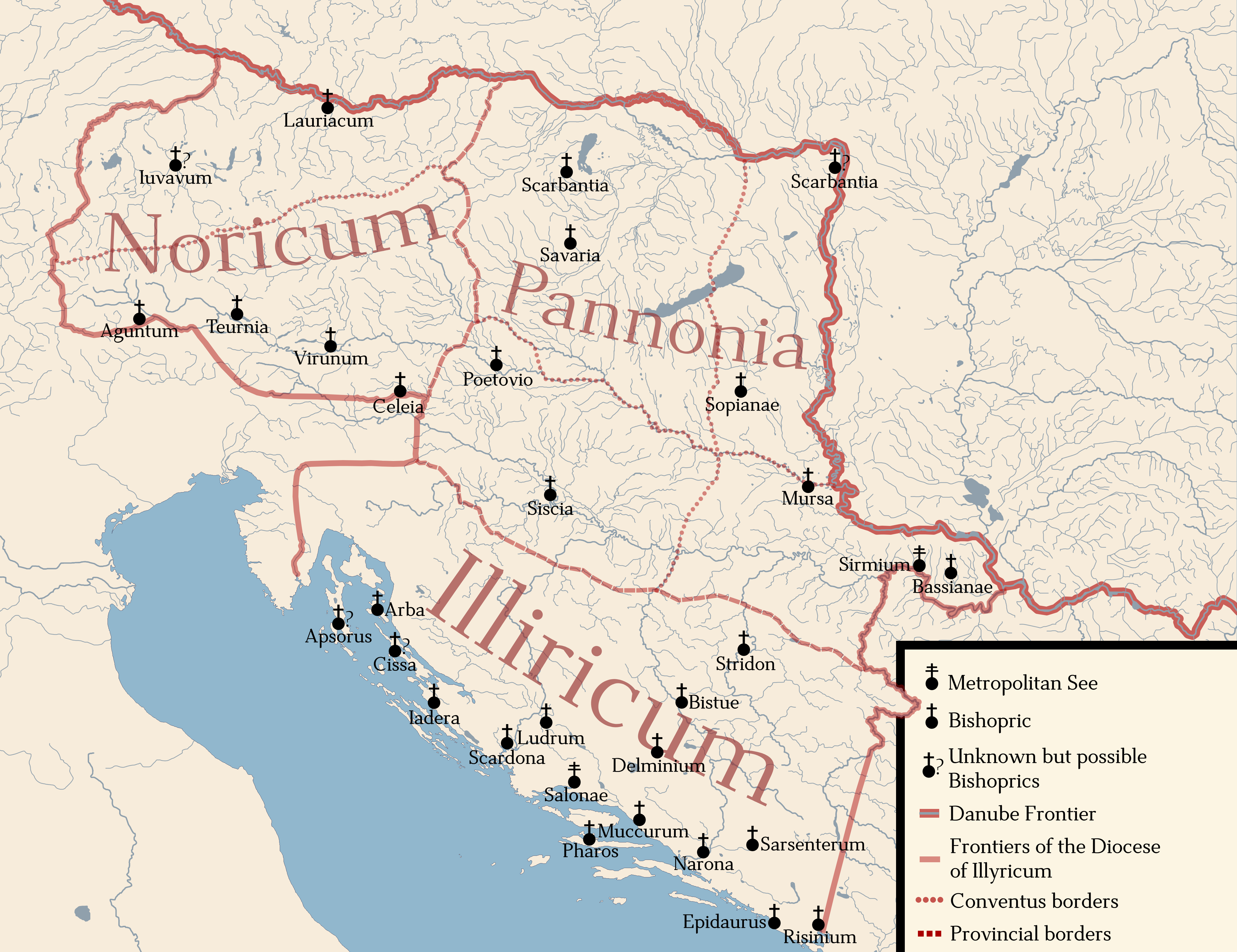
Hypothetical map of the possible Bishoprics of the Dioceses of Illyricum (Pannonia) based on the little information there is about it after the year 400 AD.

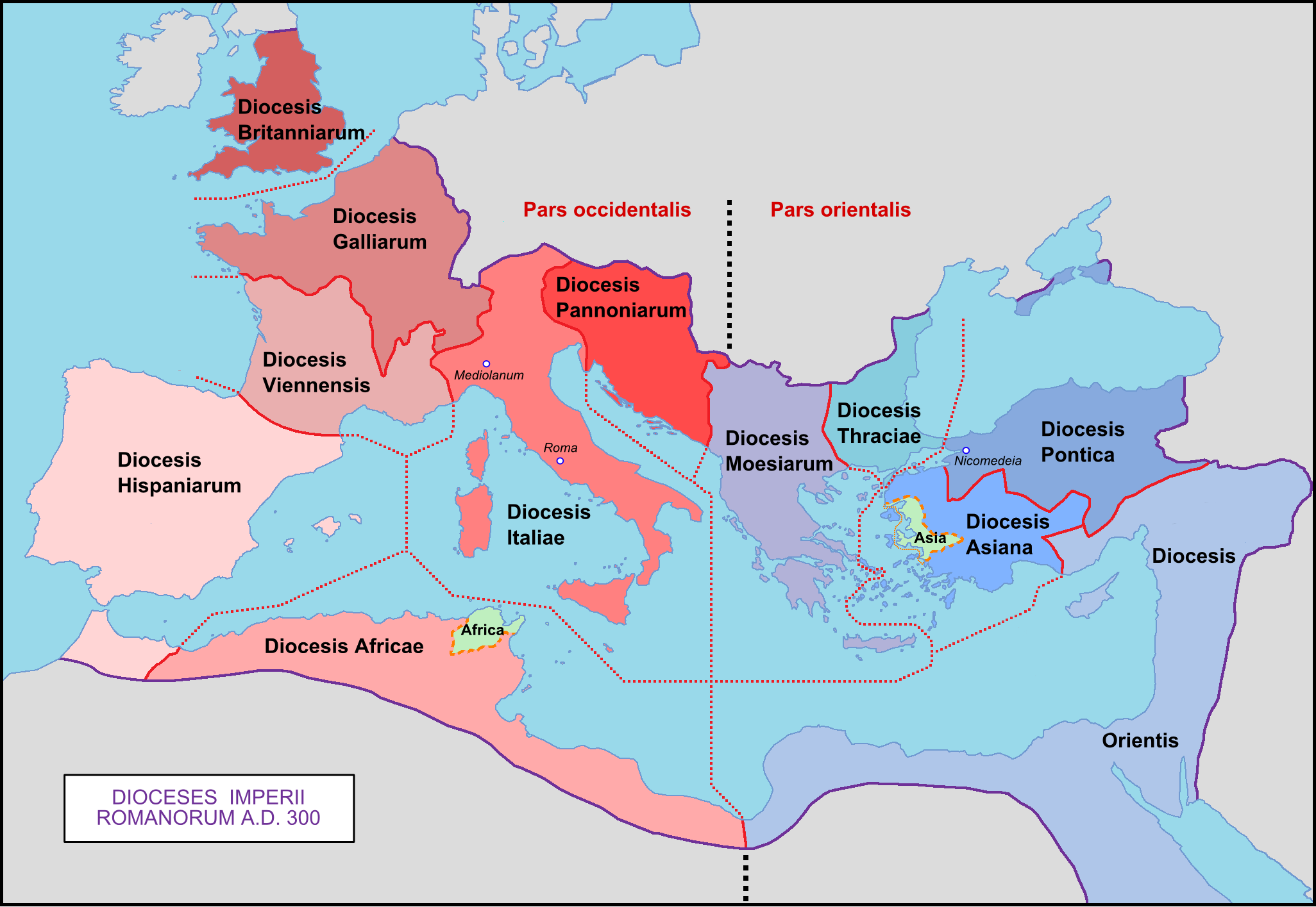
Diocese of Pannonia in 300 AD

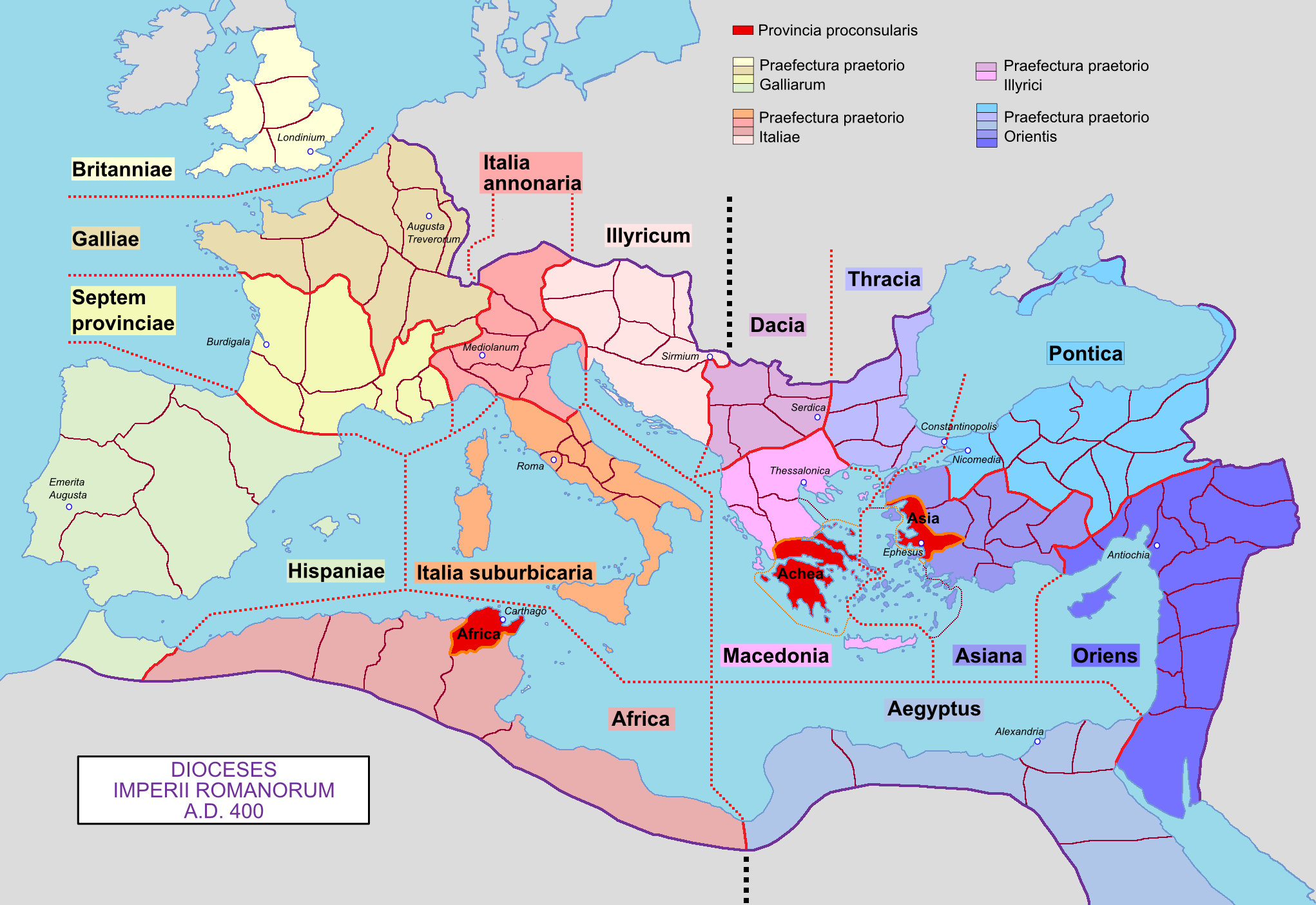
Diocese of Illyricum (Diocese of Pannonia) in 400 AD

The Diocese of Pannonia (Latin: Dioecesis Pannoniarum, lit. 'Diocese of the Pannonias'), from 395 known as the Diocese of Illyricum, was a diocese of the Late Roman Empire. The seat of the vicarius (governor of the diocese) was Sirmium.

== History ==
It was originally part of the praetorian prefecture of Italy and was incorporated by the praetorian prefecture of Illyricum when it was established in 347.

Disputed by the two halves of the Empire in the following years, the Diocese of Pannonia was one of the two dioceses in the eastern quarters of the Tetrarchy not belonging to the cultural Greek half of the empire (the other was Dacia), and so it was transferred back to the Western Empire at the death of Theodosius I in 395 and was joined to the Prefecture of Italy as the Diocese of Illyricum.

In 425 Galla Placidia gave the diocese of Illyricum to Eastern Emperor Theodosius II.

Its ultimate fate is uncertain. Pannonia was lost to the Huns in the 440s, although Dalmatia was retained by the Western Empire until c. 480.

The Ostrogoth king of Italy Theodoric the Great conquered Pannonia in the late 5th century, possibly reestablishing the diocese.

== Structure ==
The Diocese of Pannonia (Diocese of Illyricum occidentalis) included the Roman provinces of Pannonia Prima, Pannonia Valeria, Pannonia Savia, Pannonia Secunda, Noricum Mediterraneum, Noricum Ripensis and Dalmatia.

Also under its jurisdiction were the Exarch of Sirmium, the Metropolis of Lauriacum, Vindomana, Sirmium, Salona, Salisburgium and the "locus incertus" (the "unknown location", see: Miholjanec).

== List of known Vicars ==
- Valerius Licinius (308–314).

== Later usage of the term ==
In the 9th century, Diocese of Pannonia was also a name of the ecclesiastical territory of the Christian church whose archbishop was Saint Methodius.

== See also ==
- Pannonia
- Praetorian prefecture of Illyricum
- Illyricum (Roman province)

== Literature ==
- Gračanin, Hrvoje (2006). "The Huns and South Pannonia". Byzantinoslavica. 64: 29–76.
- Gračanin, Hrvoje (2015). "Late Antique Dalmatia and Pannonia in Cassiodorus' Variae". Povijesni prilozi. 49: 9–80.
- Gračanin, Hrvoje (2016). "Late Antique Dalmatia and Pannonia in Cassiodorus' Variae (Addenda)". Povijesni prilozi. 50: 191–198.
- Mirković, Miroslava B. (2017). Sirmium: Its History from the First Century AD to 582 AD. Novi Sad: Center for Historical Research.
- Mócsy, András (2014) [1974]. Pannonia and Upper Moesia: A History of the Middle Danube Provinces of the Roman Empire. New York: Routledge.
- Várady, László (1969). Das Letzte Jahrhundert Pannoniens (376–476). Amsterdam: Verlag Adolf M. Hakkert.
- Wozniak, Frank E. (1981). "East Rome, Ravenna and Western Illyricum: 454-536 A.D." Historia: Zeitschrift für Alte Geschichte. 30 (3): 351–382.
