= Marcus Nonius Macrinus =

2nd century Roman senator, general and proconsul

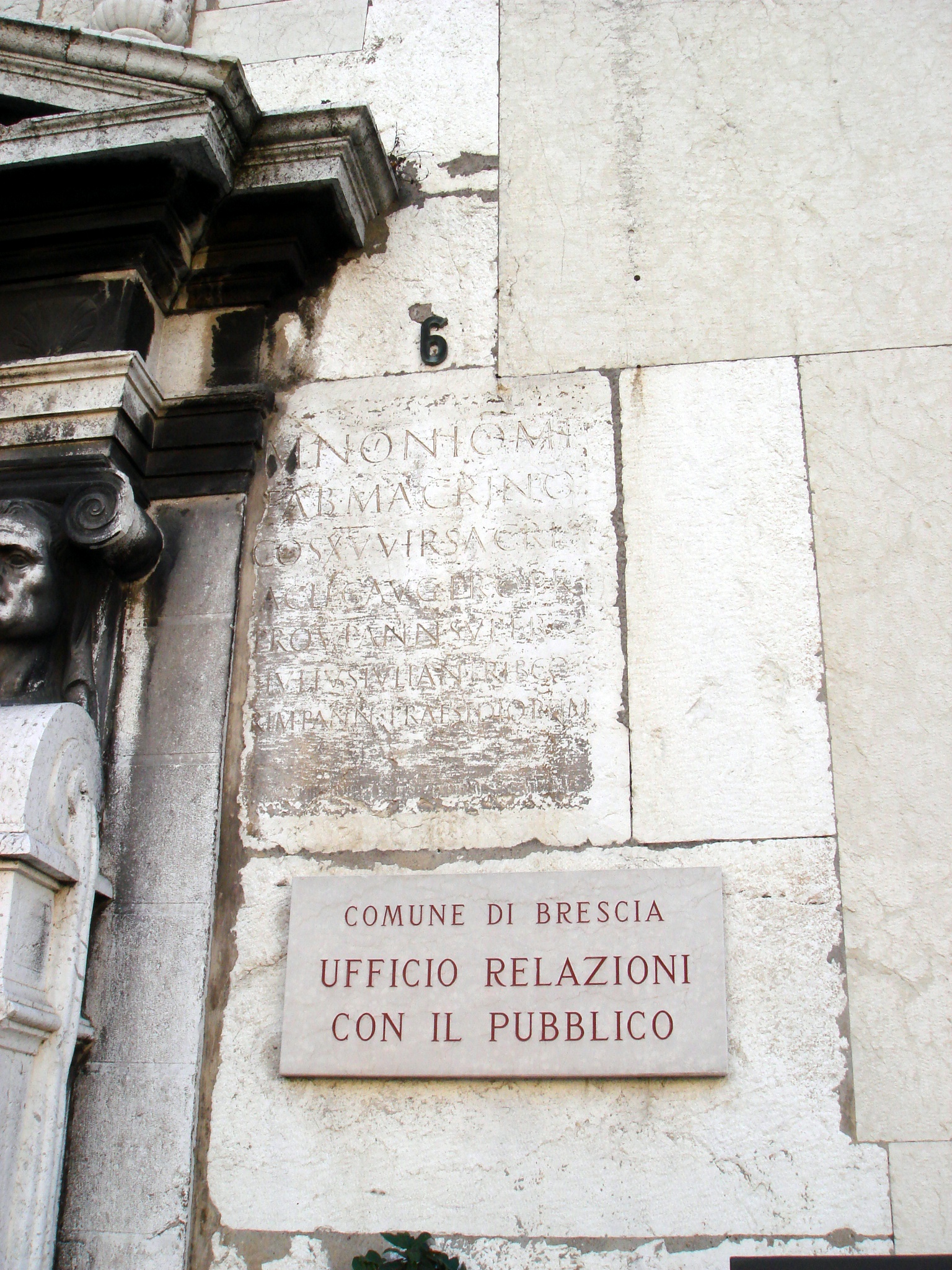
Inscription (CIL V, 4343)

Marcus Nonius Macrinus was a Roman senator and general during the reigns of the Emperors Antoninus Pius, Lucius Verus, and Marcus Aurelius. Macrinus was suffect consul in the nundinium of April–June 154 as the colleague of [Prifernius ?] Paetus.

According to his tomb's inscriptions, he was originally from Brescia (Brixia). He was an advisor to Marcus Aurelius. Nonius Macrinus served as legate of Pannonia Inferior (c. 152 – c. 154), Pannonia Superior, (c. 159 – c. 162) and proconsul of the Roman province of Asia (170/171).

== Family ==
His wife may have been named Arria (as well as having a second nomen which may have been Flavia) based on inscriptions.

== Tomb ==
In October 2008, Nonius Macrinus' tomb was discovered by archaeologists on the banks of the river Tiber, near the Via Flaminia north of Rome. In December 2012, in light of a lack of reconstruction funding, his tomb was reburied in order to preserve its fragile marble.

== In popular culture ==
Macrinus' life inspired Russell Crowe's character Maximus Decimus Meridius in the 2000 feature film Gladiator. Marcus Nonius Macrinus and the fictitious Maximus Decimus Meridius are placed within the same time period. Further, both Marcus and the fictitious Maximus are liked and well known by Marcus Aurelius. However, Marcus Nonius Macrinus went on to enjoy a successful career and died a wealthy man. In contrast, the character Maximus Decimus Meridius loses his family and is sold into slavery.

Political offices
Preceded by Lucius Verus, and Titus Sextius Lateranus as consules ordinarii	Suffect consul of the Roman Empire; 154 with Prifernius Paetus	Succeeded by Marcus Valerius Etruscus, and Lucius Aemilius Juncus as consules suffecti
