= Marcus Pontius Laelianus =

2nd century Roman senator, general and consul

Marcus Pontius Laelianus Larcius Sabinus was a Roman senator and general who held a series of offices in the emperor's service. He was suffect consul for the nundinium of July-August 145 as the colleague of Quintus Mustius Priscus. Laelianus is primarily known through inscriptions.

== Origins and family ==
According to Anthony Birley, the origin of Laelianus is indicated by his tribe, Pupina, whose members are found only in Italy "with the single exception of Baeterrae in Narbonensis, where he served twice." Birley suggests that his origins lie in Gallia Narbonensis, although an Italian origin "is slightly more likely."

In his monograph on Roman naming practices of the period, Olli Salomies writes that Laelianus is "probably" a son of the Pontius Laelianus mentioned in the Testamentum Dasumii. Other members of his family include: a son, Marcus Pontius Laelianus, consul in 163; a possible brother, Marcus Pontius Sabinus, consul in 153; and the latter's son, Marcus Pontius Varanus Sabinus. Salomies offers no explanation for the name elements "Larcius Sabinus".

Edmund Groag suggested that Laelianus married Pompeia Sosia Falconilla, the daughter of Quintus Pompeius Sosius Priscus, consul ordinarius in 149. Professor William McDermott supports this suggestion: "The gap in ages is wide, but not much more than that of Pliny and his third wife Calpurnia. Pontius may have been too busy in the army to have married earlier, or this may have been his second marriage."

== Career ==
Laelianus' cursus honorum can be reconstructed from a pair of inscriptions recorded in Rome. His public career began with the quatraviri viarum curandorum, one of the four boards that comprise the vigintiviri; this board of four men was tasked with maintaining the city roads of Rome. This was followed by his commission in Legio VI Victrix as a military tribune. The record of his time with VI Victrix includes the note "cum qua ex Germ. in Brittan. transiit": Laelianus was with the legion when it was redeployed from the Rhine frontier to its new base in Roman Britain. Birley believes the governor at the time of this redeployment (AD 122) was Aulus Platorius Nepos. Once he completed his service with this unit, he served as quaestor for Gallia Narbonensis; he was the emperor's candidate for plebeian tribune, and held the third and last of the Republican magistracies, praetor. Once he completed his tenure in that office, Laelianus was appointed curator of Arausio. After this, he received a second commission as legatus legionis or commander of Legio I Minervia; Géza Alföldy dates his command from around 138 to the year 141. After leaving his command, Laelianus was appointed governor of the imperial province of Pannonia Inferior; Alföldy dates his tenure from around 141 to 144; this is confirmed by a military diploma that mentions him as governor dated 7 August 143. His consulate followed.

As an ex-consul, Laelianus held two more offices in the emperor's service. The first was as governor of Pannonia Superior, and Alföldy dates his tenure in that province from 145 to around 150. The next office followed soon afterwards, as governor of the important province of Syria from around 150 to some time after 153.

Simultaneously with these offices, Laelianus advanced through the ranks of the ancient Roman priesthood. The first known collegium he was a member of was the fetiales, the priesthood known best for acting as heralds or ambassadors. He also was admitted to the College of Pontiffs and became a member of the sodales Antoniniani, the priests in charge of the cult of Antoninus Pius.

== The Parthian War ==
A flaw in the inscriptions is that they put the entries concerning Laelianus' activities in the Parthian War under Lucius Verus. This war transpired over the years 161 through 166; Valarie Maxfield observes, "If he was aged twenty at the time of his tribunate he will have been nearly 60 when he accompanied Verus to the Parthian war, earning dona on the consular scale of four coronae and (probably) four hastae and four vexilla." Laelianus opposed Germanic tribes, the Sarmatians, Armenians and Parthia; for his efforts, Laelianus was awarded dona militaria.

Political offices
Preceded by Gnaeus Arrius Cornelius Proculus, and Decimus Junius as suffect consuls	Suffect consul of the Roman Empire; 145 with Quintus Mustius Priscus	Succeeded by Lucius Petronius Sabinus, and Gaius Vicrius Rufus as suffect consuls
