= Siege of Sirmium =

- Part of the Avar–Byzantine Wars
- Map of the northern Balkans in Late Antiquity
Date	May 580 – Early 582 CE
Location	Sirmium
Result	Avar victory

Belligerents
Byzantine Empire	Avars

Commanders and leaders
Theognis	Bayan I

The siege of Sirmium in 580–582 was a decisive event in the history of the Balkans. The fall of the city to the Avars deprived the Byzantine Empire of its major stronghold on the northwestern Danube, opening the path for devastating incursions by the Avars and their Slavic allies into the Balkans.

Sirmium, which for much of the 6th century had been controlled by the Goths and then the Gepids, had come under Byzantine control in 567 after the Lombard–Gepid War (567). The Avars appeared along the Danube at about the same time. They launched a first attack on Sirmium in 568, but were seen off by the local governor, Bonus. The Byzantines secured peace with the Avars through the payment of an annual tribute, which by 578 had risen to some 80,000 solidi.

In 580, however, the Avar khagan, Bayan I, marched with his men to the right bank of the Sava river across from Sirmium, and began construction of a bridge to cross it. The city at the time was largely undefended and unprepared to withstand a siege, as most of the Byzantine forces were engaged in the east against Sassanid Persia. The Byzantine emperor Tiberius II tried to forestall the Avar attack by diplomatic means, but when the khagan′s ambassador demanded the surrender of the city, he replied that he would sooner give one of his two daughters as a bride to the khagan, rather than surrender Sirmium.

Tiberius managed to send in a few officers from Dalmatia to oversee the city's defence, while the envoy Theognis tried unsuccessfully to treat with Bayan. Despite the weakness of the garrison, the city resisted for almost three years, and it was not until late 581 or early 582, shortly before his death, that Tiberius agreed to surrender the city in exchange for the lives of its citizens. The Avars indeed spared the population, but took their possessions and 240,000 solidi from the Emperor, as arrears of the tribute owed over three years.

In the aftermath of the siege, many survivors fled to Salona, as evident form funerary inscriptions.

== Sources ==
- Baynes, Norman H. (1913), "Chapter IX. The Successors of Justinian", The Cambridge Medieval History, Vol. II: The rise of the Saracens and the foundation of the Western Empire, New York: Cambridge University Press, pp. 269, 275–276
- Pohl, Walter (1988). Die Awaren. Ein Steppenvolk in Mitteleuropa 567–822 n. Chr (in German). Munich: Verlag C.H. Beck. pp. 70–76. ISBN 3-406-33330-3.
