= Claudius Maximus =

2nd century Roman politician and philosopher

Gaius Claudius Maximus (fl. 2nd century AD) was a Roman politician, a Stoic philosopher and a teacher of Marcus Aurelius. No works by him are known to exist; however, he is mentioned in a few prestigious works from classical literature.

== Life ==
Anthony Birley believes that Maximus was born no later than AD 99. An inscription from Aquincum (now at the Gorsium Szabadtéri Museum) provides us details of his cursus honorum. The earliest office Maximus is attested as holding was in the quattuorviri viarum curandarum, one of the four boards that formed the vigintiviri; membership in one of these four boards was a preliminary and required first step toward gaining entry into the Roman Senate. Next he was commissioned a military tribune in Legio IV Scythica, during which time he distinguished himself, earning dona militaria from the emperor Trajan. Maximus returned to Rome, where he became a quaestor serving in the city, and upon completion of this traditional Republican magistracy Maximus was enrolled in the Senate. Following this he served as ab actis Senatus, or recorder of the Acta Senatus. Two more of the traditional Republican magistracies then followed: plebeian tribune, and praetor.

Once he stepped down from his duties as praetor, Maximus was assigned a series of imperial posts. First was curator of the Via Aurelia, which Géza Alföldy dates to around 132. Next he was commissioned legatus legionis or commander of Legio I Adiutrix, then stationed at Brigetio; Alföldy dates this appointment from around 134 to 137. Maximus served as juridius utriusque Pannonia, which was followed by governor of Pannonia Inferior alone, Alföldy dating the later office from the year 137 to 141. This was followed by his consulship.

Only a few offices of the consular portion of his cursus honorum are known. One is curator of aedium sacrarum canabenses publice, which Alföldy dates to around 144. The second was proconsular governor of Africa in 158/159. While proconsul he presided at the trial where Apuleius delivered a defense against a charge of magic. The Historia Augusta mentions Claudius Maximus as one of Marcus Aurelius' Stoic teachers. Marcus Aurelius also mentions Maximus’ sickness and death as well as that of his wife, Secunda, in his Meditations. As Marcus says Antoninus witnessed Maximus' illness, if this was the cause of his death, then he must have died at some point before the death of Antoninus in 161 AD.

The Historia Augusta reports the following anecdote from the life of Antoninus Pius, which does not refer to Claudius Maximus, rather it says Apollonius, as Marcus' other main tutors appear to have outlived Antoninus.

It is related of him, too, as an instance of his regard for his family, that when Marcus [Aurelius] was mourning the death of his tutor and was restrained by the palace servants from this display of affection, the Emperor [Antoninus Pius] said: "Let him be only a man for once; for neither philosophy nor empire takes away natural feeling".

== Characterization in works ==
=== In the Meditations ===
In the first book of his Meditations, Marcus Aurelius remembers all of the people who have had a strong and benevolent influence upon him. A "Maximus" is listed last among Marcus Aurelius' teachers and to him is given one of the longer descriptions in the first book. It is likely that Maximus' education of the future emperor took place during the reign of Antoninus Pius. Marcus claims to have learned from Maximus among other virtues self-control, honesty, gravity of character, and kindness. He describes Maximus as the perfect sage.

From Maximus I learned self-government, and not to be led aside by anything; and cheerfulness in all circumstances, as well as in illness; and a just admixture in the moral character of sweetness and dignity, and to do what was set before me without complaining. I observed that everybody believed that he thought as he spoke, and that in all that he did he never had any bad intention; and he never showed amazement and surprise, and was never in a hurry, and never put off doing a thing, nor was perplexed nor dejected, nor did he ever laugh to disguise his vexation, nor, on the other hand, was he ever passionate or suspicious. He was accustomed to do acts of beneficence, and was ready to forgive, and was free from all falsehood; and he presented the appearance of a man who could not be diverted from right rather than of a man who had been improved. I observed, too, that no man could ever think that he was despised by Maximus, or ever venture to think himself a better man. He had also the art of being humorous in an agreeable way.

— Marcus Aurelius

Later in the Meditations, Marcus Aurelius, when reflecting on suffering and death remembers how Maximus endured sickness and the death of his wife without complaint. He takes this as a model of good behavior.

Historians have had difficulty in the past identifying the person of "Maximus" mentioned in the Meditations. Méric Casaubon in his 1692 edition of the Meditations refutes in his footnotes a previously held identification of this Maximus with "that other Maximus Tyrius; mentioned by Eusebius." William Smith some two hundred years later wrote, "Some have identified Claudius Maximus with the Maximus who was consul, A.D. 144; Fabricius... identifies him with the Claudius Maximus, 'proconsul of [Africa.]'" He concludes, however, that the truth of all these identifications is "very uncertain." Only towards the end of the 20th century has there been any consensus on the matter favoring full identification of all these persons with the Maximus of the Meditations (excepting Maximus Tyrius, who was a Platonic).

=== In the Apologia ===
In the Apologia, Apuleius, author of The Golden Ass, the only completely-surviving Roman novel, attempts to defend himself against a charge of magic, largely by appealing to his judge whom he identifies as Claudius Maximus. According to Apuleius, Maximus was a pious man who shunned ostentatious displays of wealth and was intimately familiar with the works of Plato and Aristotle. Apuleius refers to Maximus as "one, who holds so austere a creed and has so long endured military service". Apuleius also makes reference to the sternness of his judge's philosophy which is understood to be a reference to Stoicism. Though Apuleius is clearly trying to flatter his judge, at least some of his attributions were likely true since he was acquitted.

=== In the Historia Augusta ===
The Historia Augusta mentions Claudius Maximus in a single sentence in the section on Marcus Aurelius. The sentence is unclear as to whether the philosophers listed were Stoics or whether the intention is to mention unspecified Stoic philosophers. It is from this entry that association was originally made between the Claudius Maximus of the Apologia and the Maximus mentioned in the Meditations. Although the Historia Augusta is known for its inaccuracies, Pierre Hadot feels that there is no reason to doubt this portion of the text because it accurately characterizes other philosophers mentioned in the same paragraph. On the other hand, the identification of Sextus of Chaeronea as a Stoic is disputed.
