= Pannonia Superior =

Province of the Roman Empire (103-3rd century)

Provincia Pannonia Superior
- Province of the Roman Empire
- 103 AD–3rd century
- The province of Pannonia Superior within the Roman Empire, c. 125 AD
- Capital: Carnuntum
- History
  - Established: 103 AD
  - Disestablished: 3rd century
Preceded by	Succeeded by
Pannonia	Pannonia Prima; Pannonia Savia

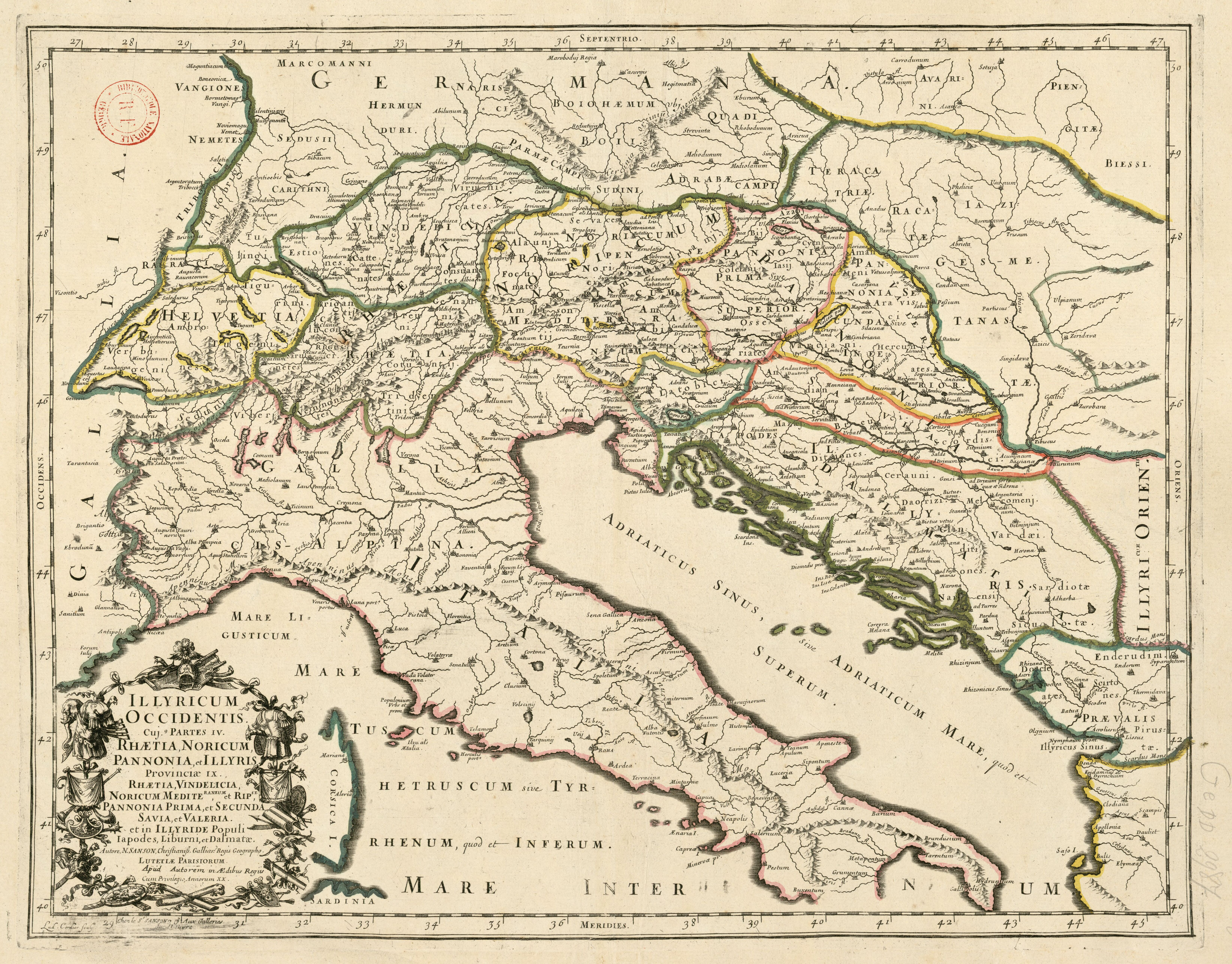
Pannonia Superior on a 17th-century map of Nicolas Sanson, French cartographer

Pannonia Superior (transl. 'Upper Pannonia') was a Roman province created from the division of Pannonia in 103 AD, its capital in Carnuntum. It overlapped in territory with modern-day Hungary, Croatia, Austria, Slovakia, and Slovenia.

== History ==
It was as governor of the province that Septimius Severus made his bid for the Roman Imperial throne in April 193 CE.

In 308 Emperor Diocletian chaired a historic meeting with his co-emperors Maximian and Galerius in Carnuntum, to solve the rising tensions within the Tetrarchy. Diocletian and Maximian were both present on 11 November 308, to see Galerius appoint Licinius to be Augustus in place of Valerius Severus, who had died at the hands of Maxentius. Galerius ordered Maximian, who had attempted to return to power after his own retirement, to step down permanently. At Carnuntum people begged Diocletian to return to the throne, to resolve the conflicts that had arisen through Constantine the Great's rise to power and Maxentius' usurpation. Diocletian's reply: "If you could show the cabbage that I planted with my own hands to your emperor, he definitely wouldn't dare suggest that I replace the peace and happiness of this place with the storms of a never-satisfied greed."

== Cities ==
Some of the important cities in Upper Pannonia were:

- Vindobona (today Vienna in Austria)
- Siscia (today Sisak in Croatia)
- Iovia Botivo (today Ludbreg in Croatia)
- Aquae Balissae (today Daruvar in Croatia)
- Andautonia (today Ščitarjevo in Croatia)
- Halikan (today Sveti Martin na Muri in Croatia)
- Savaria (today Szombathely in Hungary)
- Scarbantia (today Sopron in Hungary)
- Arrabona (today Győr in Hungary)
- Poetovio (today Ptuj in Slovenia)

== Later usage ==
The northern part of the 8th-century Frankish March of Pannonia was also called Upper Pannonia. The name can be found even much later in a similar, but wider, meaning. E.g. Otto von Freising (Chron. 6, 15) uses it to refer to Austria (i.e. Austria proper) in the 12th century.

== List of Roman governors ==
- Publius Metilius Nepos 106–107/8
- Lucius Minicius Natalis 113/114–117/118
- Lucius Cornelius Latinianus c. 126
- Cornelius Proculus 130/131–133/134
- Lucius Aelius Caesar 136–137
- Titus Haterius Nepos 138
- Lucius Sergius Paullus 139 – c. 142
- Marcus Pontius Laelianus Larcius Sabinus c. 145 – c. 150
- Claudius Maximus c. 150 – c. 155
- Marcus Nonius Macrinus c. 159 – c. 162
- Lucius Dasumius Tullius Tuscus c. 162 – c. 166
- Marcus Iallus Bassus Fabius Valerianus c. 166 – c. 169
- Gaius Julius Commodus Orfitianus c. 169 – c. 172
- Sextus Quintilius Maximus c. 175 – c. 179
- Gaius Vettius Sabinianus Julius Hospes between 182 and 191
- Prastina Messalinus after 185 to 191
- Septimius Severus 191–193
- Lucius Fabius Clio 197 – c. 201
- Tiberius Claudius Claudianus between 201 and 207
- Egnatius Victor c. 207
- Cassius Dio between 226 and 229

== See also ==
- Pannonia
- Roman provinces
- Roman Empire

== Sources ==
- Epitome de Caesaribus (translation) ca. 395.
- Barnes, Timothy D., Constantine and Eusebius. Cambridge, Massachusetts: Harvard University Press, 1981. ISBN 978-0-674-16531-1
- Lenski, Noel. "The Reign of Constantine." In The Cambridge Companion to the Age of Constantine, edited by Noel Lenski, 59–90. New York: Cambridge University Press, 2006. Hardcover ISBN 0-521-81838-9 Paperback ISBN 0-521-52157-2
- Odahl, Charles Matson. Constantine and the Christian Empire. New York: Routledge, 2004. Hardcover ISBN 0-415-17485-6 Paperback ISBN 0-415-38655-1
