= Pannonia Secunda =

Roman province (296 - mid-5th century)

Provincia Pannonia Secunda
- province of the Roman Empire
- 296–mid-5th century
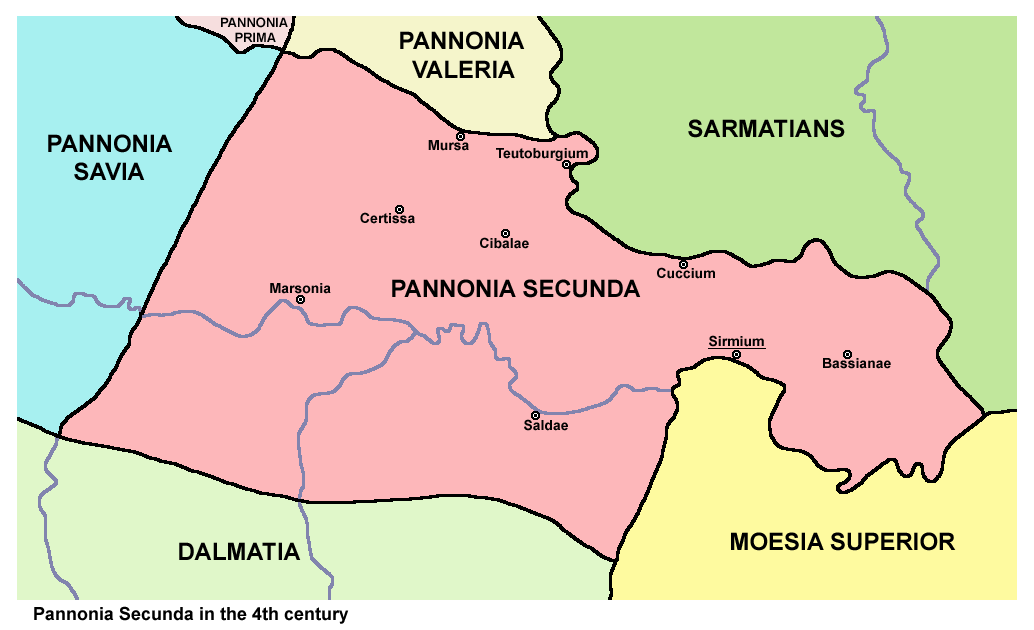
- Pannonia Secunda map
- Capital: Sirmium
- History
  - Established: 296
  - Hunnic invasions: mid-5th century
Preceded by
Pannonia Inferior
- Today part of: Serbia, Croatia, Bosnia and Herzegovina

Pannonia Secunda was one of the provinces of the Roman Empire. It was formed in 296 AD, during the reign of Emperor Diocletian. The capital of the province was Sirmium (today Sremska Mitrovica). Pannonia Secunda comprised parts of present-day Serbia, Croatia, and Bosnia and Herzegovina.

== History ==
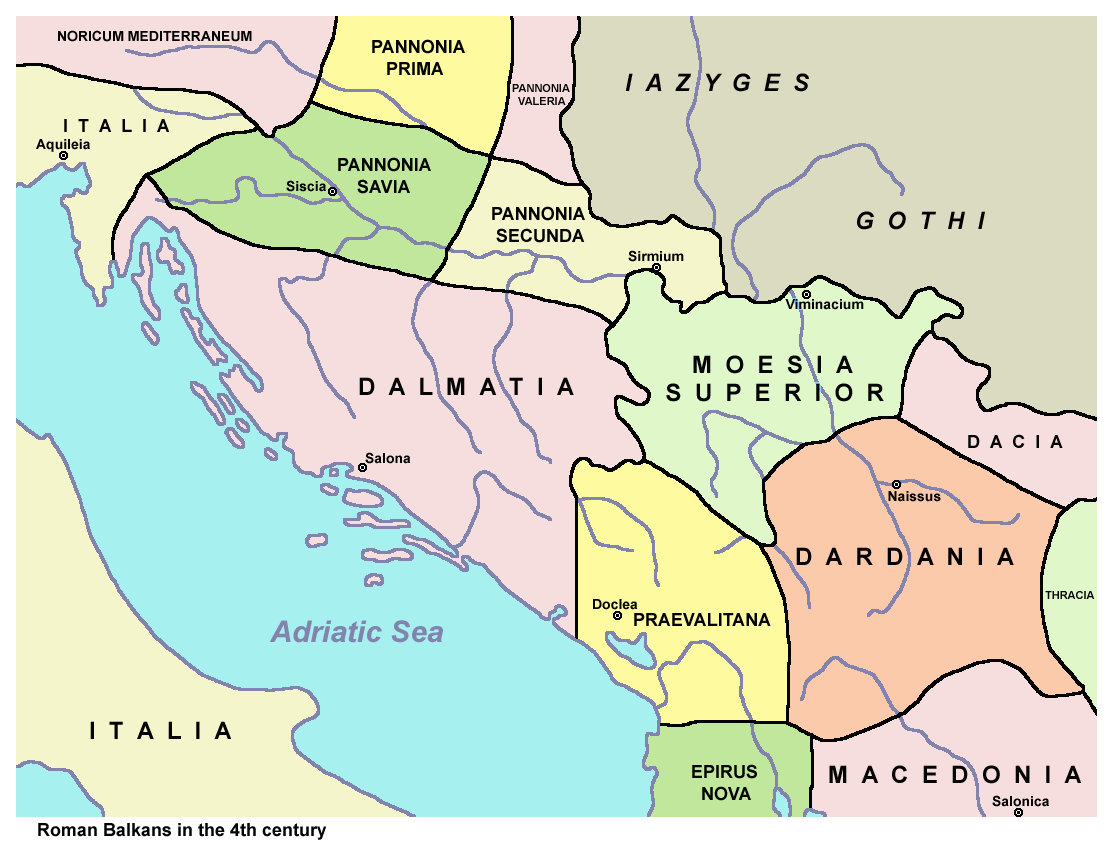
Pannonia Secunda in the 4th century

Prior to the establishment of this province, its territory was part of the province of Pannonia Inferior. In 296 AD, Pannonia Inferior was divided into two separate provinces: Pannonia Secunda in the south and Pannonia Valeria in the north. The River Drava served as the border between the two newly created provinces.

The capital of Pannonia Secunda, Sirmium, held a prestigious status as one of the four capitals of the Roman Empire. Notably, several Roman emperors were born in or near this city, highlighting its significance in the empire's history.

In 314 AD, a pivotal battle took place between two rival claimants to the imperial throne, Constantine the Great and Licinius, in the province of Pannonia Secunda, near the town of Cibalae. Despite being outnumbered, with an army of 20,000 men against Licinius' 35,000, Constantine emerged victorious after a fierce battle that lasted the entire day.

During the 5th century, the province was raided several times, by migrating peoples, including Huns and Goths. During the 6th century, the territory was contested between the Ostrogoths, Gepids, Langobards, Avars, and the Byzantine Empire.

== Cities ==
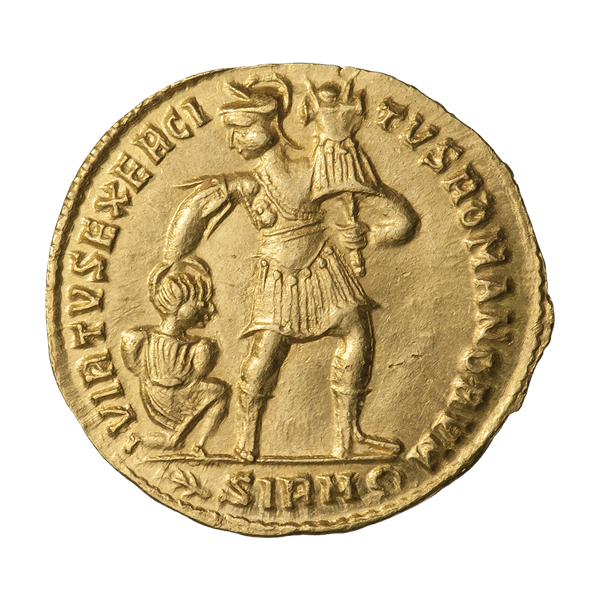
Golden solidus of emperor Julian the Apostate (361-363), stuck in Sirmium (revers)

Besides Sirmium, the other cities in Pannonia Secunda were:

- Mursa (today Osijek)
- Certissa (today Đakovo)
- Marsonia (today Slavonski Brod)
- Cibalae (today Vinkovci)
- Bassianae (today Donji Petrovci)
- Cuccium (today Ilok)
- Saldae (today Posavski Podgajci)
- Teutoburgium (today Dalj)

== Prefects ==
Among the prefects of Pannonia Secunda:

- Aprikanus (355)
- Mesala (373)
- Aurelius Victor, prefect of Pannonia Secunda under Emperor Julian.

== See also ==
- Pannonia
- Pannonia Inferior
- Pannonia Valeria
- Diocese of Pannonia
- Pannonia (Byzantine province)
- Theme of Sirmium

== Literature ==
- Curta, Florin (2001). "Limes and Cross: the Religious Dimension of the Sixth-century Danube Frontier of the Early Byzantine Empire". Старинар. 51: 45–70.
- Curta, Florin (2001). The Making of the Slavs: History and Archaeology of the Lower Danube Region, c. 500–700. Cambridge: Cambridge University Press. ISBN 9781139428880.
- Curta, Florin (2006). Southeastern Europe in the Middle Ages, 500–1250. Cambridge: Cambridge University Press. ISBN 9780521815390.
- Daim, Falko (2019). "The Longobards in Pannonia". Prima e dopo Alboino: sulle tracce dei Longobardi. Napoli: Guida. pp. 221–241.
- Given, John (2014). The Fragmentary History of Priscus. Merchantville, New Jersey: Evolution Publishing. ISBN 9781935228141.
- Gračanin, Hrvoje (2006). "The Huns and South Pannonia". Byzantinoslavica. 64: 29–76.
- Janković, Đorđe (2004). "The Slavs in the 6th Century North Illyricum". Гласник Српског археолошког друштва. 20: 39–61.
- Kazhdan, Alexander (1991). "Sirmium". The Oxford Dictionary of Byzantium. Vol. 3. New York: Oxford University Press. p. 1906. ISBN 978-0-19-504652-6.
- Kuzmanović, Zorica; Mihajlović, Vladimir D. (2015). "Roman Emperors and Identity Constructions in Modern Serbia". Identities: Global Studies in Culture and Power. 22 (4): 416–432.
- Mirković, Miroslava B. (2017). Sirmium: Its History from the First Century AD to 582 AD. Novi Sad: Center for Historical Research.
- Mócsy, András (2014) [1974]. Pannonia and Upper Moesia: A History of the Middle Danube Provinces of the Roman Empire. New York: Routledge. ISBN 9781317754251.
- Popović, Radomir V. (1996). Le Christianisme sur le sol de l'Illyricum oriental jusqu'à l'arrivée des Slaves. Thessaloniki: Institute for Balkan Studies. ISBN 9789607387103.
- Várady, László (1969). Das Letzte Jahrhundert Pannoniens (376–476). Amsterdam: Verlag Adolf M. Hakkert.
- Whitby, Michael (1988). The Emperor Maurice and his Historian: Theophylact Simocatta on Persian and Balkan warfare. Oxford: Clarendon Press. ISBN 978-0-19-822945-2.
- Wozniak, Frank E. (1981). "East Rome, Ravenna and Western Illyricum: 454-536 A.D." Historia: Zeitschrift für Alte Geschichte. 30 (3): 351–382.
- Zeiller, Jacques (1918). Les origines chrétiennes dans les provinces danubiennes de l'Empire romain. Paris: E. De Boccard.
