= Pannonia Savia =

Roman province (295 - 5th century)

Provincia Pannonia Savia
- province of the Roman Empire
- 295–433
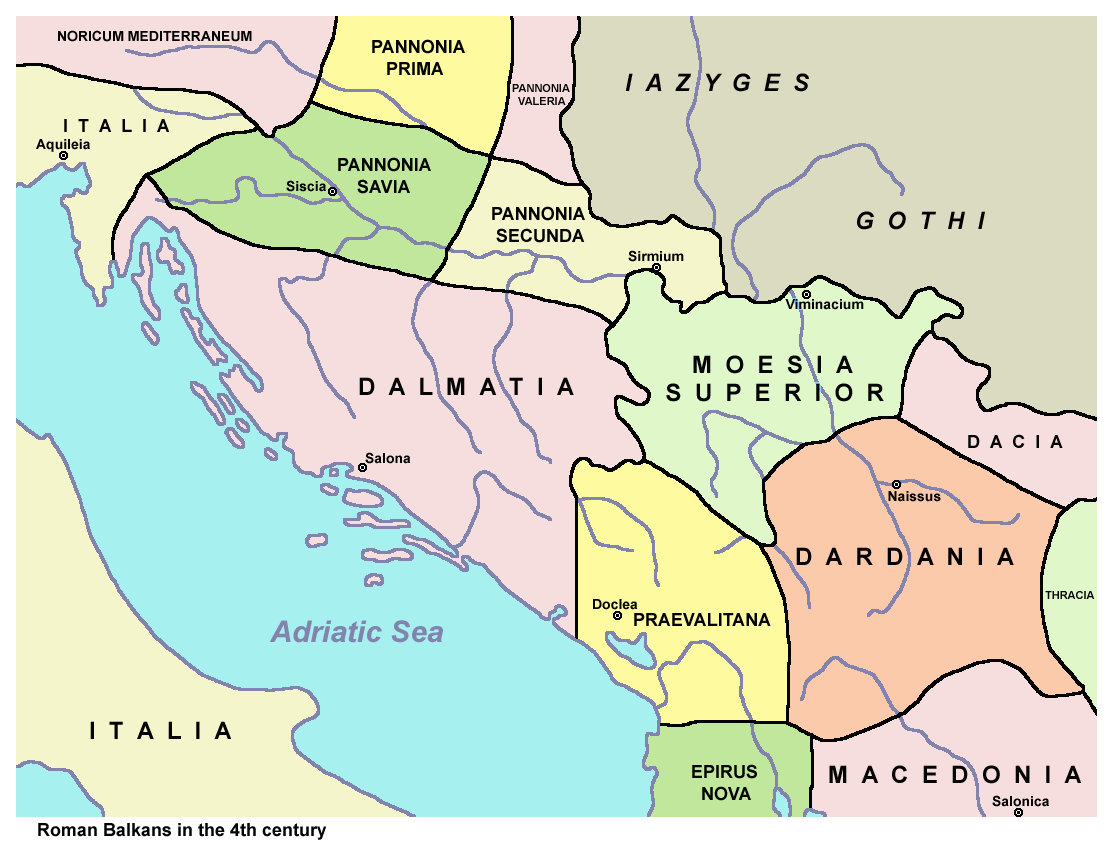
- Pannonia Savia in the 4th century
- Capital: Siscia
- History
  - Established: 295
  - Disestablished: 433
- Today part of: Croatia; Bosnia and Herzegovina; Slovenia

Pannonia Savia or simply Savia, also known as Pannonia Ripariensis, was a Late Roman province. It was formed in the year 295, during the Tetrarchy reform of Roman emperor Diocletian, and assigned to the civil diocese of Pannonia, which was attached in the fourth century to the Praetorian prefecture of Illyricum, and later to the Praetorian prefecture of Italy.

During the 4th and 5th centuries, the province was raided several times, by migrating peoples, including Huns and Goths. In the 490s, it became part of the Ostrogothic Kingdom.

The capital of the province was Siscia (today Sisak). Pannonia Savia included parts of present-day Croatia, Slovenia and Bosnia and Herzegovina.

== See also ==
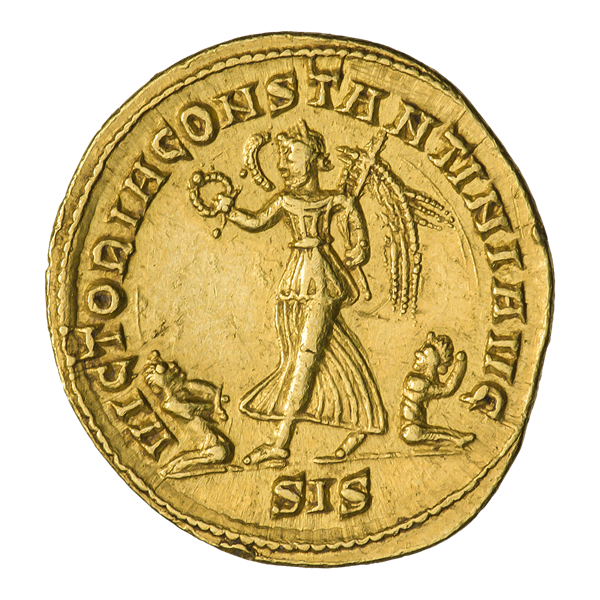
Golden solidus of Constantine I (306-337), struck in Siscia (reverse)

- Pannonia
- Roman provinces
- Roman Empire

== Sources ==
- Gračanin, Hrvoje (2006). "The Huns and South Pannonia". Byzantinoslavica. 64: 29–76.
- Gračanin, Hrvoje (2015). "Late Antique Dalmatia and Pannonia in Cassiodorus' Variae". Povijesni prilozi. 49: 9–80.
- Gračanin, Hrvoje (2016). "Late Antique Dalmatia and Pannonia in Cassiodorus' Variae (Addenda)". Povijesni prilozi. 50: 191–198.
- Mócsy, András (2014) [1974]. Pannonia and Upper Moesia: A History of the Middle Danube Provinces of the Roman Empire. New York: Routledge.
- Várady, László (1969). Das Letzte Jahrhundert Pannoniens (376–476). Amsterdam: Verlag Adolf M. Hakkert.
- Wozniak, Frank E. (1981). "East Rome, Ravenna and Western Illyricum: 454-536 A.D." Historia: Zeitschrift für Alte Geschichte. 30 (3): 351–382.
