= Pannonia Valeria =

Province of the Roman Empire

Coordinates: 46.0833°N 18.2166°E

Provincia Pannonia Valeria
- Province of the Roman Empire
- 296–5th century
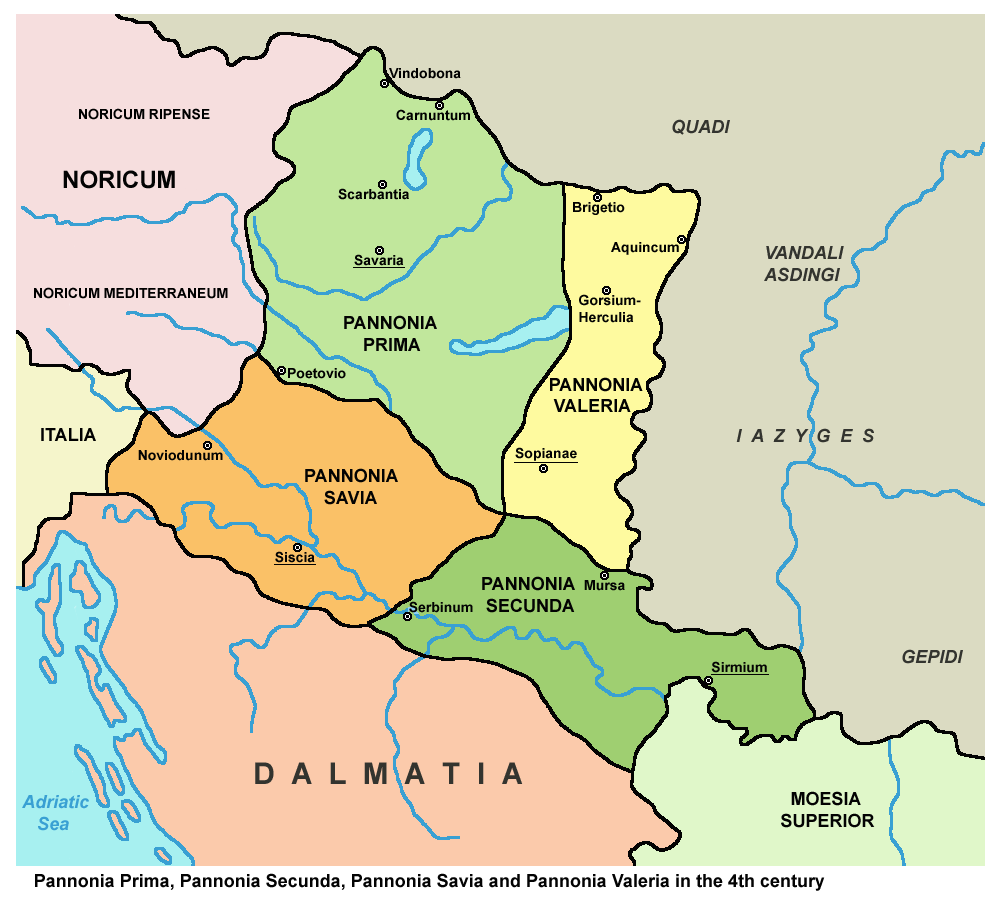
- Capital: Sopianae
- Area
- History
  - Established: 296
  - Domain of the Ostrogoths: 5th century
| Preceded by | Succeeded by |
| Pannonia Inferior | Ostrogothic Kingdom |
- Today part of: Hungary, Croatia

The Pannonia Valeria or simply Valeria, also known as Pannonia Ripensis, was one of the provinces of the Roman Empire. It was formed in the year 296, during the reign of emperor Diocletian, in a division of Pannonia Inferior. The capital of the province was Sopianae (today Pécs). Pannonia Valeria included parts of present-day Hungary and Croatia.

The province continued as an entity under the rule of the Huns until the rise of the Kingdom of the Ostrogoths in the 5th century.

It then became the central Avar realm then part of the Avar March, later grew into the Lower Pannonian Principality regaining Pannonia Secunda before being conquered by the Magyars.

== See also ==
- Pannonia
- Roman provinces
- Roman Empire

== Literature ==
- Mócsy, András (2014) [1974]. Pannonia and Upper Moesia: A History of the Middle Danube Provinces of the Roman Empire. New York: Routledge.
- Várady, László (1969). Das Letzte Jahrhundert Pannoniens (376–476). Amsterdam: Verlag Adolf M. Hakkert.
- Wozniak, Frank E. (1981). "East Rome, Ravenna and Western Illyricum: 454-536 A.D." Historia: Zeitschrift für Alte Geschichte. 30 (3): 351–382.
