= Dialects of Latin =

Throughout Roman history, there was regional variation in the Latin language. In certain regions, terms or morphological features from pre-Roman substrate languages were borrowed into the local dialects. For instance, the dialect of Gaul borrowed terms from their native Gaulish language, which was spoken by the Gauls, a Celtic people. Regional dialects were often perceived as inferior to the prestige "Roman" dialect, which—in the view of some authors—may have constituted a genuine style of speech common to the city of Rome. However, other authors perceived their ideal "Roman dialect" as an artificial, prescribed standard of "correct" speech that did not necessarily reflect the vernacular of any given region.

== Gaulish ==
=== Influence of substrate languages ===
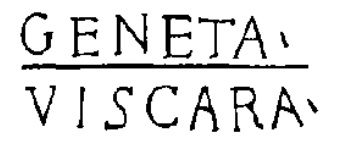
Inscription reading Geneta vis cara

There are numerous inscriptions from Gaul written in a mixed dialect of Latin and Gaulish, with both languages borrowing heavily from the other. One inscription from Autun reads geneta vis cara ('dear girl, do you want?'), containing the Gaulish word geneta ('girl') but the Latin terms vis ('you want') and cara ('dear'). Another text, also from Autun, reads nata vimpi pota vi(nu)m (possibly meaning girl, pretty one, drink wine), containing only one Gaulish term: vimpi. Other texts appear more as Latinized Gaulish than as Gallicized Latin: the Lezoux Plate is largely Gaulish, although it contains the Latin loanwords vero and curri. The Lex Salica, a Frankish legal text created around 500 CE, provides further attestation of Gallo-Roman words derived from Celtic sources. The text contains terms such as segusium ('sleuth hound') or vassus ('servant'), from Proto-Celtic *segūsios and *wassos respectively. Adams suggests that the Gaulish language likely imposed the greatest influence on the local dialects of Latin shortly after the Roman conquest, as native Gaulish speakers aimed to learn Latin as a second language. Adams further argues that the Gallic influence likely waned over time, as the decline of the Gaulish language ensured that the newer speakers of Gallo-Latin acquired their dialects more distant from the influence of native Gaulish speakers. Gaulish texts from La Graufesenque contain the first declension nominative plural ending -as instead of the standard ending -ae, such as in the terms licuias and pannas. Adams argues that this may derive from the original Gaulish nominative plural ending -as and may have been reinforced by the presence of the ending in the nominative plural in other dialects of Latin.

Gallo-Latin texts from La Graufesenque dated to the 1st-century CE contain the Latin term canastrum, a dialectal variant of canistrum ('wicker basket'), both of which derive from Ancient Greek κάναστρον (kánastron, "basket of reeds"). The Gaulish term is closer to the original Greek term, leading Adams to suggest that the Gauls directly borrowed the word from Greek colonies rather than from native Latin speakers. Furthermore, the given term may have possessed a distinct meaning from the standard Latin term: the Gaulish term is used to describe an earthenware vessel, a meaning shared between this term and the original Greek word, although the standard Classical Latin form is exclusively attested as referring to wicker wood vessels and rarely gold or silver vessels.

Within Gallo-Roman naming conventions, it was common to adopt a traditionally Gaulish name as a cognomen: the female name Livia Divogena utilizes the Latin nomen Livia and the Gaulish cognomen Divogena and the male name Sex(ti) Iu(v)enti(i) Senoviri Dubnotali f utilizes the Latin praenomen Sextus and the Gallic names Senoviri and Dubnotali. Gaulish personal names developed into Roman gentile names: the Gallo-Roman man S. Matucenius Frontinus and his daughter, Matucenia Placida, borrowed their gentile name—Matucenius—from the Gaulish name Matucenius. In other circumstances, Gaulish patronymics developed into Roman gentile names: the Gallo-Roman woman Carantia Aelia adopted her name from her the cognomen of her father—Medillio Caranto. Latin influence appears even in circumstances in which names were transcribed according to traditional Gallic naming formula: the phrase Sacrillos Carati ('Sacrillus, [son of] Caratus') contains exclusively Gaulish names, although it shows that Latinized genitive singular ending -i. Another inscription reading Frontu Tarbetis[o]nios contains the Latin cognomen Frontinus used as an individual name, although the overall inscription conforms more to Gaulish styles of naming formula than Roman.

Gallo-Romans also created new names by Latinizing preexisting names, possibly—in some circumstances—by calquing Gaulish names into Latin. One inscription attests to a Gallo-Roman woman with the Latin name Ursula, a name which derives from the Latin word ursa, meaning 'bear'. This woman was the daughter of another woman named Artula, a Gaulish name which likely derives from the Gaulish word for bear: *arto-. Stüber argues that the daughter was likely named after her mother, and the Gaulish name was calqued into a Latin equivalent. Other examples, such as the Roman names Primus, Primigenius, Primullus, which may have emerged in Roman Gaul as calques of the Gaulish names Cintus, Cintugenus, and Cintullus, all of which derive from *kintu- ('first'). The classicist Andreas Gavrielatos argues that the appearance of numeral names in Gallo-Roman inscriptions suggests that the custom of Gaulish numeral names was preserved, although the Gaulish names were replaced with Latin equivalents. Gavrielatos cites the example of a Gallo-Roman man with the Gaulish numeral name Cintullus, who gave his son the Roman name Tertius ('third') and his daughter the Roman name Quintia (fifth). Likewise, his son married a woman with the Latin numeral name Secunda (second), who was herself the daughter of Toutilli, a man with a Roman name. Elements of Gaulish culture were preserved in Gallo-Roman names, such as the names Epponus or Epidius, which derive from the name of the Gallo-Roman goddess Epona, whose name ultimately derived from a Celtic root.

Fathers with Gaulish names often granted their children Roman names: the Gallo-Roman man Litumari provided his son with the Latin name Silvanus and the Gaulish man Excingi named his son Albanus. However, other inscriptions attest to individuals with Roman names granting their children Gaulish names: the Gallo-Roman man Gemellus provided his son with the Gaulish name Divixtos, which utilizes the Gaulish nominative singular ending -os instead of the Latin ending -us. The linguist Karin Stüber suggested that, at least for a certain period of time, both Gaulish and Roman names were used frequently amongst the Gallo-Roman population.

=== Phonology ===
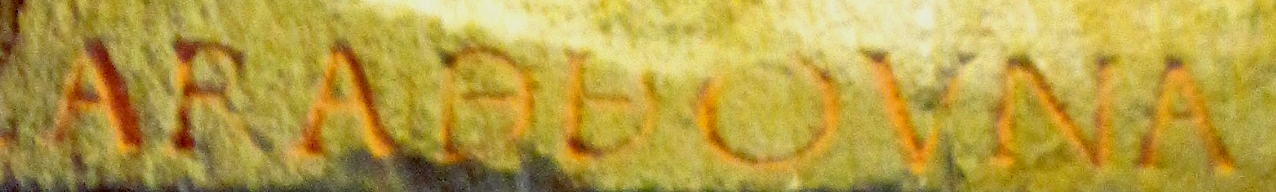
Inscription containing the letter tau Gallicum

During the transition from Classical Latin to Proto-Western-Romance the long /eː/ and short /i/ vowels merged into close /e̝/, and the long /oː/ vowel and the short /u/ merged into close /o̝/. This phonological development can be observed in Gaulish inscriptions that confuse the spellings ⟨e⟩ and ⟨i⟩, such as ficit for fecit or menus for minus, and spellings that confuse ⟨o⟩ and ⟨u⟩. Research by the Hungarian linguist Adamik Béla suggested that, although a minority of inscriptions dated to the first three centuries CE demonstrate conflation of the ⟨e⟩ and ⟨i⟩ graphemes, such confusion was more common in the Gaulish provinces of Aquitania, Lugdunensis, and Narbonensis. In contrast, the Gaulish province of Belgica showed significantly fewer examples of such orthographic confusion. However, from the years 301-500 CE, the rates of vowel confusion across all Gaulish provinces dramatically increase, with Belgica emerging as the province displaying the most instances of such vowel conflation. Belgica and Narbonensis also reveal the least examples of confusion between ⟨o⟩ and ⟨u⟩ during the first three centuries CE, although—like in all Gaulish provinces—it increased over time.

Linguist Joseph Barbarino collected data regarding the potential confusion of the graphemes ⟨b⟩ and ⟨v⟩ in initial, intervocalic, postconsonantal position or in verb endings. His data revealed that—from the 4th to the 5th century, within the provinces of Lugdunensis and Narbonensis—there were 593 correct usages of the grapheme ⟨v⟩ compared to only 19 errors. Inscriptions from the same provinces during the 6th-7th centuries reveal 164 cases of correct uses of ⟨v⟩ compared to only 5 inaccurate uses. Collectively, this data reveals little evidence of a merger between ⟨b⟩ and ⟨v⟩, a phenomenon that occurred throughout the Romance world, including Gallo-Romance. This may indicate that the merger occurred at a slower rate within Gallo-Romance than other branches of the Romanic languages. However, Barbarino notes that a higher percentage of intervocalic errors were founded in inscriptions from Lugdunensis, leading him to conclude that the merger was either underway or completed within the region by the 5th-century.

Evidence from La Graufesenque reveals the dialectal form paraxidi, a variant of paropsidi ("dessert-dish"), and inbrax[tari?], an uncertain form perhaps related to Latin bractea ('thin sheet of metal'). These terms may have preserved an ancient feature of Gaulish orthography: the velar spirant, a phoneme within the Gaulish language, was transcribing utilizing the Greek letter χ. This velar spirant appeared in the first letter of the consonant clusters ps, pt, and kt. Adams suggests that further evidence for the presence of the velar spirant in Gaulish Latin appears in surviving French words. For instance, the French term caisse may be explained as a derivation from a Gallicized variant *caxsa, itself from capsa. Another feature of the Gaulish language that may have been preserved into the Gallo-Roman dialect was the merger of long /eː/ and /i:/ into a close vowel represented orthographically as ⟨i⟩, a feature attested in Gallic-Latin by the frequent misspellings of the Latin term acetabulum as acitabulum. Gallo-Latin inscriptions sometimes a unique letter referred to as the tau Gallicum that likely represented a dental phoneme.

Consentius, a 5th-century Latin grammarian, claims that a certain "iotacism" (iotacismum) afflicts the dialects of provincial Romans. Consentius claims that Gauls pronounce the letter "more richly (pinguius)", citing the example of the ⟨i⟩ in the term ite, which the Gauls supposedly pronounce which a "richer sound" (pinguiorem sonum) between ⟨i⟩ and ⟨e⟩. It is possible that Consentius was referring to the shift from long /iː/ to short /i/ and from short /i/ to /e/, a development which occurred in the Romance languages. He contrasts the Gaulish dialect with the Greek dialect, which he believes to favor a "thinner" (exilius) pronunciation, leading to the Greeks pronouncing the term ius in such a manner that it becomes disyllabic. He further contrasts both accents with the ideal, although possibly not typical, Roman pronunciation, in which ⟨i⟩ was pronounced in a "thin" manner when placed at the beginning of words, a "richer" sound at the end of words (i.e. in habui), and the in-between sound when placed in the middle of words (i.e. in hominem). Consentius appears to be prescribing "correct" language as opposed to describing dialectical features of Latin: he explicitly advises his readership to avoid barbarisms by ensuring their speech is not "richer or thinner than the theory (ratio) of Roman language demands". This passage utilizes the term ratio ('reason'), which Quintilian includes within his criteria for proper speech: "Reason (ratione), Antiquity (vetustate), Authority (auctoritate), and Usage (consuetudine)".

== British ==
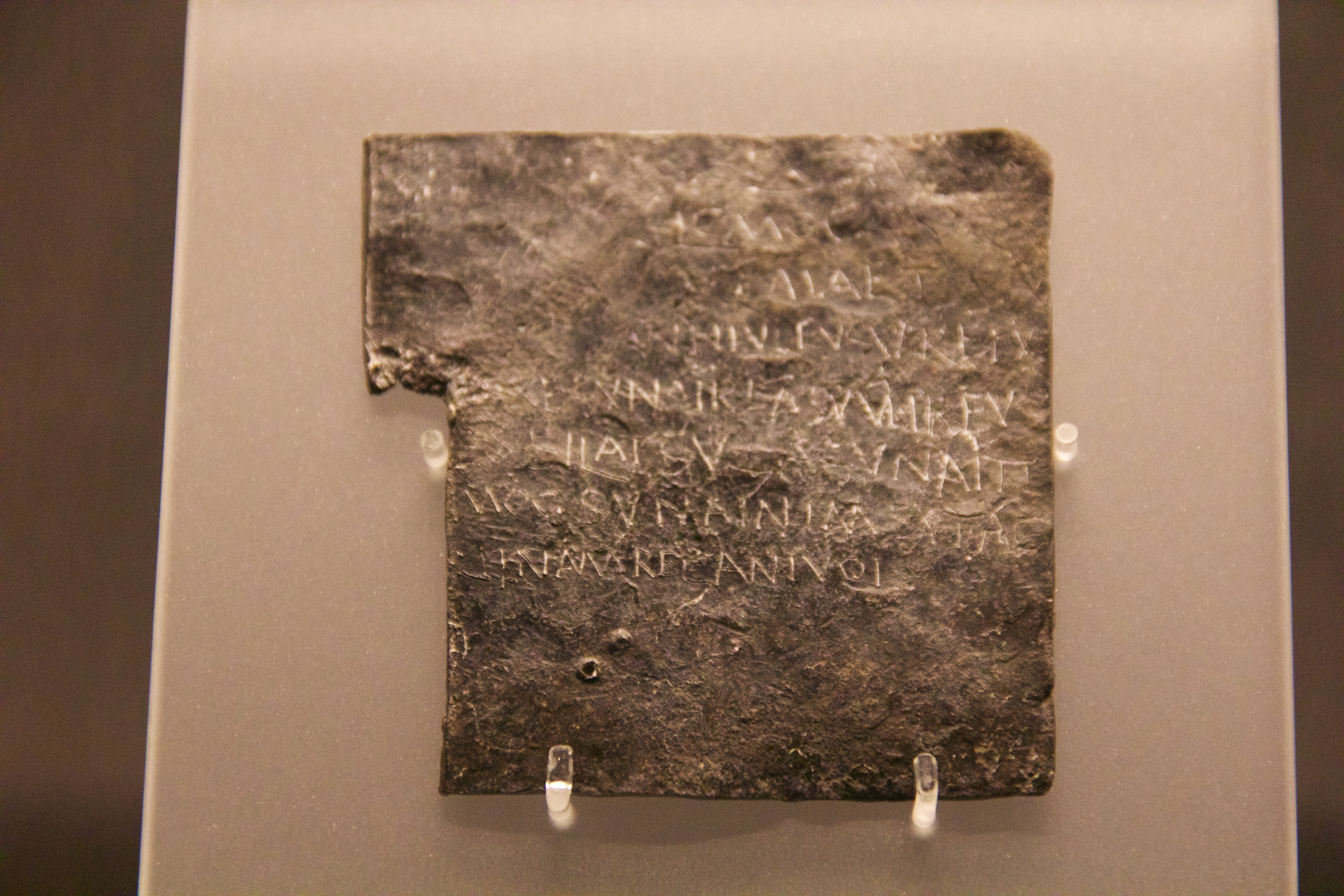
Example of British Latin writing from the Bath curse tablets

Much of the surviving corpus of Latin inscriptions in Britain were likely authored by non-native Britons, such as soldiers stationed far from their homeland or merchants traveling across the empire. However, certain inscriptions—such as the Bath curse tablets—likely were created by local inhabitants of the region and thus can provide insight into their dialect. Furthermore, it is possible that inscriptions written by foreigners may still display elements of British Latin, as travelers to Britain may have adopted features of the local vernacular into their speech. Latin words borrowed into the Brittonic languages may also provide evidence for the type of Latin dialect found in the region, from which the words would have been loaned.

== Hispanic ==
=== Regional lexicon ===
One 2nd-century CE inscription from León written by a member of the Legio VII Gemina contains the dialectal term paramus ('plain, plateau') and the possibly dialectal form disice, providing evidence of local regionalisms within formal texts. Further dialectal terms appear in the Lex metalli Vipascensis, a law uncovered on two bronze tablets from Aljustrel that reads qui mulos mulas asinos asinas caballos equas sub praecone vendiderit in k(apita) sing(ula) (denarios) III d(are) d(ebeto) ('he who shall have sold at auction mules, male or female, donkeys, male or female, or horses, male or female, must pay three denarii per head'). This text utilizes the term caballos to refer to male horses and the term equas for mares, a linguistic development that persisted in Ibero-Romance. However, Adams suggests that, although the development would come to be restricted to the Iberian Peninsula, the inscriptional evidence attests to its presence in regions throughout the Empire during this period, such as a 2nd-century CE inscription from Vindolanda. This same law includes the term lausia ('stone chip'), which may connect to the reconstructed Vulgar Latin *lausa ('flagstone'), itself possibly of Celtic origin. Numerous descendants of this reconstructed Vulgar Latin term survive in Romance languages across Iberia and southeastern France, such as Old Provençal lauza. Adams suggests that the term ternagus and possibly the ablative plural form ubertumbis, obscure words found in the text, likely were Hispanic regionalisms derived from a non-Latin substrate. Furthermore, Adams argues that other rare words in the inscription, such as rutramen or recisamen, likely constituted technical terms used pertaining to mining, the practice with which the law was concerned. Thus, they may have been used throughout the empire and belonged to a unique register of the language specific to mining terminology. However, Adams also proposes that the general uniqueness of the terms throughout the remainder of the text could indicate that such mining terms were Hispanic regionalism and not a component of mining-related vocabulary across the empire. Isidore of Seville mentions numerous Hispanic regionalisms, including the term cama ('bed'), which survives in Catalan, Portuguese, and Spanish. Although Isidore derives the term from Ancient Greek χᾰμαί (khămaí, on the Earth), the terms true etymology is unknown and possibly from Paleohispanic sources. Other terms described by Isidore were formed from preexisting Latin words: the Late Latin verb cattō ('to see') derives from the verb captō in the sense of 'to strive to see'. This term survives through Ibero-Romance terms such as Spanish and Galician catar and Gallo-Romance terms such as Old Occitan catar.

=== Morphology and phonology ===
The linguist Leonard Curchin analyzed orthographical errors in Latin inscriptions from Hispania Tarraconensis, documenting numerous peculiarities of Hispanic orthography. One inscription contains the term Matrubos, which utilizes the unusual dative ending -ubos, an ending that appears in Celtiberian inscriptions (such as the Celtiberian term Arekoratikubos). Other erroneous inflection endings include the usage of the form nepotae instead of nepti ('nephew') and the usage of the form dibus instead of the more standard form dis as the dative and ablative plural of deus ('deity'). The most common consonant errors were misspellings of the grapheme ⟨x⟩, as attested for in various Hispanic misspellings of the Latin term uxor as ucsor, uxxor, or uxsor. It was also common to replace the grapheme ⟨c⟩ with ⟨q⟩, as attested by the misspellings Herquli, quravit, arqarius, and diqas for Herculi, curavit, arcarius, and dicas. Another common feature of Hispanic orthography was the loss of double consonants: excusus instead of excussus. The grapheme ⟨h⟩ is often omitted: thus, abeat and anelat for habeat anhelat.

== Italian ==
=== Morphology ===
==== First declension genitive singular ending -aes ====
The genitive singular ending -aes typically appears in feminine nomina ('family names') of Latin origin, particularly in the names of women who bear a Greek cognomen. For instance, the woman Marciaes Tyches bears the Latin name Marcia but also, the Greek name Tyche. This unique ending is present in areas formerly inhabited by Ancient Greek colonists, such as central and southern Italy, Egypt, and the Danubian provinces. However, the terms alaes and Flavaes appear in a set of tablets discovered in Vindonissa, a former Roman military camp in Switzerland, and the term Verecundaes appears in an inscription from Noricum—both far removed from Ancient Greek colonists. Adams notes that the Latin name Epaphras is attested with the genitive singular ending -aes in the Oxyrhynchus papyri despite the original Greek word Ἐπαφρας (Epraphrâs) bearing the genitive ending -ᾶ. Thus, Adams concludes that the form was—at least in this situation—more an imitation of the Ancient Greek language than a genuine reflection of its features. However, the linguists Tommi Alho and Ville Leppänen argue—based on their analysis of brick stamps containing the unique form—that it was used haphazardly without any clear pattern or purpose, indicating that it may have been—at least by the 2nd century CE—a normalized form imported from Greek into the vernacular of some Romans.

==== First declension dative singular ending -a ====
According to statistics collected by the German scholar Wolfgang Blümel, there are 33 instances of the first declension dative singular ending -a, of which 18 appear in Latium, although only two examples appear in Rome. Blümel also notes the presence of four inscriptions from Etruria and five inscriptions from Pisaurum. Spanish linguist Francisco Villar Liébana created a larger list of 48 instances of this phenomenon dated to the Republican period, although Adams considers much of these examples "uncertain". Villar's list includes six instances from formerly Paelignian territory and another example from formerly Marrucinian lands, both of which were located in central Italy. Further instance surface in the Italian regions of Calabria, Capua, and Tor Tignosa, a tower within Lanuvium; the island of Delos reveals two examples, which may reflect the influence of Italian merchants who had visited the island for trade or business purposes; and another example from Hispania has been discovered. Due to the large proportion of inscriptions from rural Latium, the scholar Hubert Petersmann concluded that—in areas of Latium outside Rome—the Old Latin first declension dative singular -āi lost the final -i. Italian scholar Romano Lazzeroni proposed that the Latinization of the Paelignian and Marrucinian peoples occurred through these rural dialects, explaining the appearance of such features in Paelignian and Marrucinian territory. Adams, however, argues that this feature was likely not a feature of the broader dialect, but instead confined to a religious register as it almost exclusively appears in personal names, the names of mythical or cultural heroes, divine epithets, or in the names of deities. Adams further suggests that the scarcity of evidence regarding the religious register of the city of Rome during this time prevents a conclusive determination regarding the differences between an urban and rural religious register of Latium, noting that only two inscriptions from Rome contain divine names in -ai and one inscription contains -a. Adams considers the example from Spain, an inscription from Tarraco reading M. Vibio Menrua, to have likely been produced by an Italian immigrant to Spain rather than a native inhabitant of Hispania. Thus, it may not reflect any Hispanic dialect of Latin, but merely the Italian dialect of its creator. Adams premises his analysis of the inscription upon the form Menrua, which was used in Etruscan inscription. Adam also cites the name Vibius, which became popular in Rome by the 3rd-century BCE, although it likely originates amongst the Sabelli and is found in Etruscan inscriptions.

==== Third declension genitive singular ending -us ====
Various Latin inscriptions showcase a genitive singular third declension ending -us, as opposed to the standard Latin third declension ending -is. This form may have derived from the Proto-Italic consonant stem ending *-os. It often surfaces in religious inscriptions, such as an inscription from Cassinum referring the goddess Venus that reads Agria Sucia N(umeri) f(ilia) / sacerdos / Ce/rer(us) et Venerus. It also appears in legal texts, such as the Tabula Bantina (150–100 BCE), Epistula ad Tiburtes (159–145 BCE), senatus consultum de Bacchanalibus (118 BCE), and the Lex Agraria (111 BCE), which contains the phrases est ab eo quoius eius agri locei hominus privati and non siet iudicatave non siet quod eius praevaricationus. The German scholar Wolfgang Blümel lists 23 instances of this irregularity, almost of which originate from rural areas outside Rome. Blümel documents examples from Amiternum, Narona, Norba, Capua, Praeneste, Puteoli, Casinum, and Anagnia. Examples from within Latium occur within Praeneste, such as an inscription dated from 300 to 251 BCE reading Orcevia Numeri [uxor] / nationu(s) gratia / Fortuna Diovo fileia / Primogenia / donom dedi. The classicist James Noel Adams argues that the tendency of surviving examples to appear in rural areas is not necessarily reflective of any regional Latin dialect but may instead be a consequence of the disproportionate number of all surviving Old Latin inscriptions that were found in areas outside Rome. Adams notes that the divine names Salutus, Cererus, Castorus, and Venerus, which demonstrate this peculiarity of Old Latin, are also attested with the standard -is ending more often in areas outside of Rome. Moreover, Adams notes that the legal texts were likely originally authored in Rome before being distributed to other regions, indicating that the form likely also was utilized by urban Romans. Adams concludes that the form was likely an archaism used for religious and legal purposes.

==== Perfects marked by -t(t)- ====
The Lex Luceria, a Roman law dated to the 3rd century BCE from the formerly Oscan town of Luceria, contains the verb forms fundatid, proiecitad, and parentatid. These terms are likely perfect subjunctive forms that imported the perfect affix -t(t)- found in Oscan words such as duunated ('to give') or prúfatted ('to approve'). The Lex Luceria contains other Oscanisms that further corroborate the theory of Oscan influence, such as the raising of the ⟨e⟩ before ⟨r⟩ in stircus (stercus, "dung") or epenthesis in the macisteratus (magistratus, "magistrate"). Rex Wallace, an American classicist, suggested that these terms may have been incorporated into Latin through an Oscan substrate, in which native Oscan speakers erroneously imported elements of their native language into Latin whilst attempting to learn Latin as a second language. Wallace notes that, in other circumstances, contact between the Oscan and Latin languages resulted in the incorporation of Latin features into Oscan. Moreover, Wallace argues that inflectional endings are among the features least likely to be borrowed by native speakers into their own native language.

=== Phonology ===
==== Monophthongization of /au̯/ to /oː/ ====
Sextus Pompeius Festus claimed that the rustici ('rustic [folk]') once utilized the term orum instead of aurum ('gold') and the term oricula instead of auricula ('earlobe'). Although Festus was writing in the 2nd-century CE, Adams argues that his source was likely the lexicographer Verrius Flaccus, who wrote during the 1st-century BCE. This feature may have spread to the vernacular of the well-educated and urban Romans as it appears in an expression from the works of Cicero: oricula infima ... molliorem ('softer than the lobe of your ear'). The term also appears in the Rhetorica ad Herennium ('Rhetoric for Herennius'), an ancient text on rhetoric of unknown authorship that may date to the 80s BCE. Suetonius records that the consul Mestrius Florus reprimanded the Emperor Vespasian (r. 17–79 CE) for pronouncing the word plaustra as plostra, leading Vespasian to—on the following day—mispronounce the name Florus as Flaurus. Coleman suggests that this feature likely characterized dialects spoken west and north of Rome, noting that such monophthongization had already occurred in the closely related Umbrian language (Umbrian uhtur for auctor). One 2nd-century BCE inscription from Minturnae contains the form Plotia instead of the name Plautia, although Coleman considers the extent to which this inscription accurately represents the dialect of southeast Latium "uncertain". According to Coleman, the few examples of this feature from the city of Rome, such as one inscription containing the term Pollae instead of the name Paulae, may be explained through the arrival of immigrants that spoke with this feature in their native dialect. The only other instance of this feature from a major urban center, according to Coleman, is the form opscultat instead of auscultat from Pompeii. Coleman further suggests that many of the attestations of this feature were authored by slaves or freedmen, indicating that it may have varied along social class rather than exclusively geographical region.

==== The grapheme ⟨o⟩ instead of ⟨u⟩ ====
Forms attested in Norba, such as Locina, and terms attested in Praeneste, such as losna and Poloces, show ⟨o⟩ where the equivalent Classical Latin forms, luna, Pollux, and Lucina show ⟨u⟩. However, Praeneste also shows forms such as Polouces and Norba reveals the term Loucina. Coleman suggests this feature emerged due to the monopthongization of Proto-Italic */ou/ into /ō/, before it eventually shifted into /ū/ by the time of Classical Latin. Coleman notes that this feature appears in other Italic languages, citing terms such as Umbrian totam from Proto-Italic *toutā and Faliscan Locia in comparison to Latin Lucia. Although Adams suggests that—in the Praenestine dialect—it is likely the phoneme /ō/ appeared where Classical Latin showed /ū/, he argues that it is not possible to definitively conclude that the form ⟨o⟩ was necessarily exclusive to a select set of Latin dialects. According to Adams, these terms cannot be contrasted with contemporaneous Old Latin forms from the city of Rome that show the grapheme ⟨u⟩, thereby preventing the determination that other forms of Latin did not also show /ō/. The term robigo, in contrast to rubigo, is attested in one inscription from Praenestine dated between 9 BCE to 37 CE, although this spelling is also widespread throughout Classical Latin literature. Moreover, Adams argues that the form nontiata (Classical Latin: nuntiata) was likely produced at Rome, as it appears in the Epistula praetoris ad Tiburtes, a legal document uncovered in Norba dated to the 150s BCE. Suetonius claims that Emperor Augustus (r. 27 BCE – 14 CE) utilized the genitive singular form domos instead of the archaic genitive singular domuos, itself instead of the Classical Latin genitive domus. According to Suetonius, Augustus exclusively utilized his preferred genitive form in writing to ensure none would assume its appearance was a mistake rather than "habit" (ne quis mendam magis quam consuetudinem putet.). Coleman considers this assertion "inexplicable", although he allows for the possibility that it was a feature of a Volscian dialect of Latin that Augustus acquired during his time at Velitrae, a former Volscian city.

The lexical variation between ⟨o⟩ and ⟨u⟩ also occurs in terms pronounced with the short vowel /ŭ/ in Classical Latin, most typically in second declension terms marked by the endings -us or -um. Thus, names such as Cornelius or Decimus may be spelt as Cornelio or Decimo. Amongst regular nouns, the terms pocolo(m) and dono(m) are the most frequently attested forms bearing this peculiarity. According to the linguist Giovanna Marotta, 56% of examples of such alternation appear in names, 30% appear in regular nouns, 7% appear in verbs, 6% appear in adjectives, and only 0.3% appear in pronouns. Marotta further notes that in 87% of examples of this variation, the substitution occurs in the final syllable of the word and, in 95% of all instances of the feature, the alteration occurs following a stressed syllable. Marotta concedes that—in certain circumstances—this variation may constitute an archaism, such as in names, titles of important sociopolitical positions (i.e. Praifecto instead of Praefectus), and phrases common to epigraphic writings.

==== The grapheme ⟨u⟩ instead of ⟨o⟩ ====
There are various Latin inscriptions in which terms conventionally spelt with ⟨o⟩ are spelt with ⟨u⟩, potentially—in some circumstances—due to influence from the Oscan language, which closed the long /ō/ vowel into /u/. The terms flus appear on multiple amphorae from Pompeii, formerly an Oscan settlement. The meaning of this term and its morphology are uncertain: it has been varyingly interpreted as a dative singular reminiscent of Oscan fluusaaí, a nominative singular, or an abbreviated form of the Latin term Florae. Although this term may be interpreted as an Oscan term, Adams notes that one example of this term appears on an amphora containing the definitively Latin term felicis, indicating—according to Adams—that the term was considered to be Latin. Another inscription uncovered on a cippus from Castelvecchio Subequo, a former Paeligian territory, contains distinct dedications to Hercules, reading sa. seio(s). sa. f. herclei. donom ded(ed). brat(eis). datas and seio(s). sa. f herclei victurei. The term victurei is likely equivalent in meaning to Latin Victorae, although it orthographically resembles the Oscan term víkturraí. Adams argues that it is likely that this inscription demonstrates a regional dialect of the Latin language that was itself influenced by a mixture of both the Latin and native Italic languages. One inscription dated to the 3rd-century BCE from Navelli, formerly a Vestinian territory, reads t.vetio | duno | didet | herclo | iovio | brat | data. The form shows largely Latin inflectional endings and certain orthographical choices, such as the omission of the final -m in duno or the final -s in vetio, are consistent with other Latin inscriptions. However, the initial -u in duno is reminiscent of Oscan dunúm;" the reduplicated form didet is unlike the Latin form dat but close to the Paelignian term dida;" the phrase brat data or equivalent alternative forms are common in Oscan writings and unlike the Latin equivalent grate data;" and Herclo utilizes Latin inflection endings, although the form is an Italic o-stem term while the standard Latin term was third declension. Adams concludes that this inscription likely represents a dialect formed from the mixing of Latin and a local Italic language.

==== The digraph ⟨oi⟩ instead of [uː] ====
The Proto-Italic diphthong /*oi/ was lost in Latin, evolving into the form /ū/, although it was retained in the Oscan language. Formerly Oscan territories such as Capua and Grumentum contain terms such as loidos, moerum, or the verb forms coerare and coirare instead of the Classical Latin equivalents ludos, muros, and curare. Coleman suggests that it is reasonable to explain these forms due to influence from the Oscan language. Adams, however, notes that these forms often appear in non-Oscan areas, such as the appearance of coerare or coirare in regions such as Toulouse or Delos. Thus, Adams concludes that it was most likely an intentional archaism unrelated to regional dialect. Adams concedes the possibility that the forms in Oscan territory were related to an Oscan substrate, whereas the forms from other regions were motivated by unrelated circumstances, although he warns that there is no evidence directly supporting such a conclusion.

==== The grapheme ⟨u⟩ instead of ⟨i⟩ ====
Forms such as Decumus, mancupium, or manufestus instead of Classical Latin Decimus, mancipium, or manifestus surface on inscriptions often dated to around the 1st century BCE. The earliest instance of this feature appears on an inscription dated to 117 BCE from Genoa containing the form infumo, although this inscription also contains the more standard form infimo. According to the Classicist Robert Coleman, the labials surrounding the vowel likely asserted an assimilatory force that helped it survive through a process of vowel reduction. Quintilian, a 1st-century CE Roman orator, mentions that this practice appeared in older texts and that an individual named Gaius Julius, likely Julius Caesar, was the first individual to write optimus maximus instead of optumus maxumus. The 2nd-century CE grammarian Velius Longus claims that the letter "i" is sometimes "thin" (exilis) and sometimes "thick" (pinguis), leading to confusion regarding whether the proper spelling of certain words required ⟨u⟩ or ⟨i⟩. Longus states that this feature was a component of the "ancient speech" (sermonem antiquitatem) that Cicero considered to be "rustic". He further claims that the "ancients" preferred to "write" (scribere) utilizing the spelling and "pronounce" (enuntiare) the words accordingly. Coleman argues that such forms likely persisted in various dialects of Latin spoken beyond the city of Rome. Quintilian records that there was a sound in-between "u" and "i" (medius est quidam U et I litterae sonus) that was not represented in writing; he mentions that this sound resulted in different pronunciations for the terms optimus and opimus. Adams suggests that the change from ⟨u⟩ to ⟨i⟩ was merely an orthographical switch between which letter represented this unique sound and did not necessarily reflect any phonological development.

==== Monophthongization of ⟨ae⟩ ====
The monophthongization of ⟨ae⟩ occurred in other Italic languages, such as Umbrian and Faliscan, and may have appeared in other dialects of Latin. Varro potentially alludes to such a feature, mentioning that the form hedus was used in rural Latium instead of haedus ('young goat'), which was popular "in the city" (in urbe). Further literary evidence derives from the 2nd-century BCE satirist Gaius Lucilius, who jokes Cecilius pretor ne rusticus fiat ('let Cecilius not be appointed a rustic pretor'), implying the existence of a rustic form pretor instead of standard Classical Latin Praetor. These descriptions are supported by epigraphical evidence; the form ⟨e⟩ instead of ⟨ae⟩, although rare, is far more frequently attested outside of Rome than inside the city. The formerly Marsian territory of the Lacus Fucinus is home to forms such as the name Vesune or the title qestur (Quaestor), both of which can be connected to non-Latin Italic forms from inscriptions in the same region, such as the exact equivalent form Vesune from an inscription discovered at Ortona dei Marsi or the Umbrian term kvestur (Quaestor). Other texts from formerly Umbrian regions such as Spoletium or Fulginiae contain forms such as cedito (caedito, "to cut") and the name Supunne respectively. Although it is possible that such features were imported into the local dialect from the once dominant Umbrian people, the monophthongization may have occurred independently or have merely been reinforced by the Umbrian language. Terms such as Pretod (Praetor) or c[u]estod (Quaestor) appear in Latin inscriptions from Falerii Novi in the Faliscan alphabet, indicating that this feature may have been present in a Faliscan dialect of Latin. It is possible that such a feature was present in other dialects of Latin, however this phonological irregularity may not have been represented in the inscriptions of certain regions if the diphthongal spelling remained the "correct" spelling even after the underlying sounds it represented changed.

==== Long close vowel [eː] for [iː] ====
The Classical Latin long vowel [iː] evolved from the Old Latin diphthong *ei, perhaps through an intermediary long close vowel -ē. This intermediate stage is attested for in inscriptions that utilize the grapheme ⟨e⟩ where standard Classical Latin utilizes the grapheme ⟨i⟩, e. g. plourime instead of plurimi. Adams suggests that this unique form emerged in regions that preserved the intermediary stage instead of developing the long vowel [iː]. Quintilian mentions that ⟨e⟩ was used for ⟨i⟩ in more ancient writings; he treats form such as Menerva, leber, magester, and Diiove Victore as antiquated spellings for Minerva, liber, magister, and Diiovi Victori. Other Roman authors during the Classical period associate this feature with rural dialects of Latin: the 1st-century BCE statesman Cicero, in his De Oratore, mocks the speaker Sulpicius for dropping the letter "I" and subsisting it with a "very full" (plenissimum) "E", which Cicero considers to be in imitation not of the "ancient orators" (antiquos oratores) but the "harvesters" (messores). Marcus Terentius Varro, a 1st-century BCE Roman polymath, notes two distinct rustic pronunciations that also replace "I" with "e:" he claims that the rustici ('farmers') pronounce the word spīca as spēca in an "old-fashioned manner" (antiquitus) and say vēlla instead of vīlla ('country estate'). Forms such as Hercule or duomuires appear in Latin inscriptions from the 2nd-1st century BCE, providing credence to the notion that this pronunciation was characteristic of rural Italian Latin. One inscription from Praeneste dated from 150 to 101 BCE reads C(aius) Tampius C(ai) f(ilius) Se(rvi) n(epos) / Tarenteinus pr(aetor) / Hercule d(onum) d(edit) l(ibens) m(erito), utilizing the term Hercule instead of Herculi. However, Adams cautions that—since more Republican Latin inscriptions have been unearthed outside of cities—the distribution of evidence is naturally biased towards rural inscriptions rather than urban.

The presence of terms such as sibe (Standard Latin: sibi), nise (Standard Latin: nisi), and coniuge (Standard Latin: coniugi) in inscriptions uncovered at Patavium indicates that this unique form persisted in a Paduan dialect of Latin until at least the 2nd-century CE. Quintilian claims that the forms sibe and quase (Standard Latin: quasi) were found in the texts of "many writers" (in multorum libris), although he did not know "whether the authors wanted this" (an hoc voluerint auctores nescio). Quintilian purports that his contemporary, Asconius Pedanius, wrote with this dialectical feature; he further states to have learned from Pedanius that the 1st-century BCE author Livy frequently utilized these forms. Coleman suggested that these features may reflect the shared origins of Pedanius and Livy in Patavium.

Moreover, evidence from inscriptions reveals a dative singular ending -e where the standard Latin shows the third declension dative singular "-i' is used. For instance, an inscription from Pisaurum—formerly an Umbrian city—contains the statement Iunone Reg(inae) / Matrona / Pisaure(n)se(s) / dono ded(e)ro(n)t, which utilizes the form Iunone instead of the standard Latin form Iunoni. This feature may have survived from the original Umbrian language, which utilized the third declension dative endings -e or -e. Likewise, inscriptions from former Marsian territory occasionally contain the dative forms Iove or Ive, which may relate to the dative form Iove found in an ancient inscription written in the Marsian language. Another inscription from the Luco dei Marsi contains the ablative plural form Mar/tses, which shares the ending -es (Standard Latin: -is) with the Umbrian language, and possibly the related Marsian language. This ending may have emerged via the monophthongization of -eis, which appears in Old Latin, itself from the Proto-Italic ending *-ais. Furthermore, the forms vecos (Standard Latin: vicus), Valetudne, (Standard Latin: Valetudini) patre, (Standard Latin: patri) and Aplone all appear in former Marsian territory. From this evidence, Adams concludes that there is "good evidence" indicating that the long close vowel [eː] was present in a regional dialect of Latin spoken during the early Republic in the territory of the former Marsi people. However, these forms are found in other regions throughout Italy: One inscription made before 220 BCE from Cales, a former Oscan territory, reads K. Serponio Caleb. fece veqo. Esqelino C. s., " substituting the standard Latin form fecit for fece. Another inscription from Capua reads Ser(vius) Folvius Q(uinti) f(ilius) Flaccus co(n)s(ul) muru(m) locavit / de manubies, replacing the standard form manubiis with manubies. Adams argues that it would be an "extreme position" to suggest that the Marsian forms were due to a substrate whereas the equivalent forms elsewhere emerged due to unrelated phonological developments.

==== Vowel [e] for [i] in hiatus ====
One inscription from Falerii reads hoi med mitat Kavios monios Qetios d[o]nom pro fileod, substituting the vowel [i] for [e] in the term fileod. Coleman considers this feature, the replacement of [i] with [e] before mid or open vowels, to have been a feature of Faliscan Latin. Coleman notes that the Faliscans utilized the term hileo as the equivalent of Latin filius, indicating that this feature was present in the native Faliscan Latin prior to Romanization. Further examples surface in former Sabine territory: the form Feronea (Classical Latin: Feronia) appears at the ancient Sabine city of Trebula Mutuesca and the term [Fe]ronea appears at the Lucus Feroniae, which is located on the border between the ancient Faliscans and Sabines. Another inscription from Praeneste reads Dindia Macolnia fileai dedit, demonstrating the same irregularity as the Faliscan inscription. However, Adams notes that a previous line in the same inscription states that it was produced in Rome, contradicting the notion that this feature was characteristic of the Praenestine dialect. Due to the sparsity of evidence, with only 7 individual examples of this feature, Adams concludes that it the peculiarity cannot be assigned to any specific dialect of Latin. Moreover, these inscriptions span across of a period of 400-500 years, further complicating any attempt to assign them to a specific period in a specific region. Adams instead connects this feature with other terms that show ⟨e⟩ for ⟨i⟩ in Latin inscriptions, such as tempestatebus, semol, and dedet instead of tempestatibus, simul, and dedit. The Swiss linguist Rudolf Wachter suggests that confusion regarding the usage of ⟨e⟩ and ⟨i⟩ likely emerged as the vowels were pronounced closely together. Adams, in support of this theory, notes that Trebula Mutuesca contains the form Feronea and Feronia. Plautus, a 3rd-century BCE Roman playwright, mentions that— instead of the term ciconia ('woodpecker')—individuals from Praeneste utilized the word conea, opening the /i/ before the vowel /a/.

==== Assimilation of -m(b)- to -m(m)- and -n(d)- to -n(n)- ====
The assimilation of -m(b)- to -m(m)- is a feature present in modern Romance languages spoken in central and southern Italy, often formerly Osco-Umbrian areas. However, Adams notes that it is also present in the Sardinian language and Italian dialects spoken near the Dolomites, areas which were likely uninfluenced by Osco-Umbrian languages. Spanish philologist Ramón Menéndez Pidal argued that this feature was introduced into Ibero-Romance by colonists in Spain who either spoke Osco-Umbrian languages or had adopted a dialect of Latin that was itself influenced by Osco-Umbrian characteristics. The philologist Curtis Blaylock criticized this theory for insufficient evidence, highlighting that only two Umbrian terms might constitute examples of such assimilation in the entire Osco-Umbrian language family: umtu and menes. The term umtu only supports this theory if it is cognate with Latin ungen and derived from a Proto-Italic *ongʷn̥ through an intermediate *omben. Likewise, the form menes is of uncertain etymology: it may have emerged the assimilation of a Proto-Italic form *kom-benes, although this theory necessitates an unexplained disappearance of the prefix. Evidence from Oscan provides examples of terms that lack this assimilation: the term kúmbened shows an unassimilated -mb- morpheme and terms such as embratur reveal an unassimilated -mbr- morpheme. There is scant evidence of this feature in the Latin language itself: the term ammulantibus appears instead of ambulantibus in one manuscript from Caldey Island and the verb forms commurere, commussint, commuratur all may constitute a variation of the verb combūrō. Adams suggests that this type of assimilation was likely a rare quirk of speech that affected a small number of words, rather than a widespread tendency of a great multitude of speakers that impacted entire dialects.

Menéndez Pidal proposed Osco-Umbrian origins for the assimilation of -n(d)- to -n(n)-, a phenomenon which occurs in the Catalan language, some Aragonese dialects, regions throughout Italy such as Sardinia and Naples, and Gallo-Romance dialects spoken in areas from Gascony to Wallonia, This phonological development is much more well-attested in Osco-Umbrian, appearing throughout gerundive forms such as Oscan úpsannúm instead of Latin operandam. The German linguist Gerhard Rohlfs, however, maintained his rejection of the Italian component of this hypothesis on the basis that such assimilation is a typical linguistic change best explained by a natural tendency towards simplification of speech rather than a substrate. Adams rejected the entire hypothesis on the same grounds, asserting that the assimilation was entirely banal and easily explained without involvement from Osco-Umbrian.

There is limited evidence corroborating a shift from -n(d)- to -n(n)- in the Latin language itself, although Adams suggests that many examples are best explained by other motivations. The Appendix Probi, a Late Latin manuscript documenting errors common to the local vernacular, advises its readers to utilize the form grundio instead grunnio, although Adams argues that the assimilated form is best explained by remodeling after terms such as gannio and hinnio. Another inscription from Pompeii contains the term verecunnus, which may have been an assimilated form of verecundus ('feeling shame') or—as Adams suggests—a jocular remodeling after cunnus ('vagina'). Nonius Marcellus quotes a passage from Plautus including the term dispennite, although it is rendered as the more standard form dispendite in the manuscript tradition. Although this form may be dialectal, Adams suggests that—assuming the text of Nonius is accurate—the form is more likely an archaism. Adams argues that Proto-Italic verb *patno may have evolved into *panno through assimilation, before shifting to pando under the influence of verbs such as scando. Adams concedes, however, that such assimilation may have occurred in formerly Celtic provinces, as British inscriptions attests to forms such as Vindolana instead of Vindolanda and the hypercorrection Gabaglanda instead of Camboglanna. Further evidence derives from the city of Rome, in which an inscription reading Iulia Oriunna instead of Iulia Oriunda/" was discovered. Another inscription from Naples dated to 170 CE contains the misspelt form indulgen(tia) instead of the standard term indulgentia.

== Balkan ==
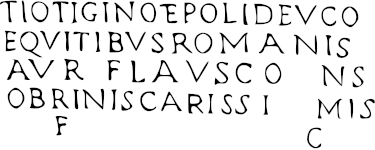
Example of the Pannonian-Latin dialect uncovered on a sarcophagus from Brigetio.

The onomasticon of Dalmatia and Pannonia contain numerous names derived from pre-Roman Celtic, Liburnian, Illyrian, and Dalmatian sources. Celtic names such as Bricussa, Illyrian names such as Teutana, Pannonian names such as Cursulavia, and Liburnian names such as Vescleves all appear throughout the epigraphic record from the region, including inscriptional evidence dating as late as the third century. Typically, these names were borrowed as cognomen within the standard Roman three-name structure, as in the name of T. Flavius Plassus and Aurelia Madussa. Further evidence for a unique type of Balkan-Latin may derive from certain linguistic features restricted to a certain geographical region, or isoglosses, shared between Romanian and Albanian. For instance, the Latin word draco ('dragon') acquired the meaning of "Devil" in Ecclesiastical Latin, a meaning preserved into Albanian dreq and Romanian drac but not into other Romance languages. One inscription from Dalmatia contains the phrase area Stephano presbytero ('area of the presbyter Stephanus'), demonstrating a use of the possessive dative, a development reflected in the merger of the genitive and dative in various Balkan languages.

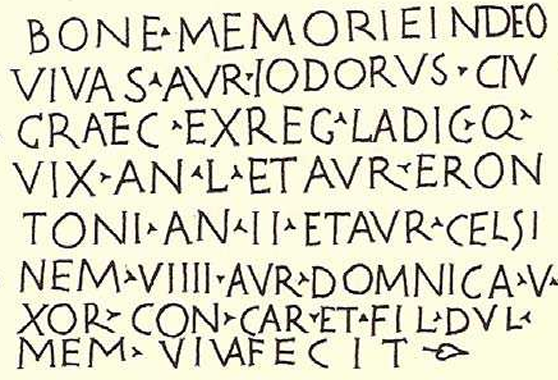
Ancient Roman inscription from Savaria dated to the 4th-century CE. It contains Vulgar Latin features such as the syncope of Dominica to Domnica, the reduction of /ˈa.o/ to /a/ in Ladicena, the syncope of /ˈae̯/ in Bone for Celsine, and memorie and Bonae, memoriae, and Celsinae. The name Iodorus is also unique and not found in any other inscription.

In Pannonia, intervocalic /i/ likely evolved into the voiced palatal approximant [j], a development demonstrated by the orthographical tendency to replace ⟨i⟩ and ⟨e⟩ in hiatus. This orthographical confusion likely derived from a Romance development in which unstressed ⟨i⟩ and ⟨e⟩, when in prevocalic position, were pronounced as [j]. Thus, misspelt forms such as Thiodora for Theodora and Deanae for Dianae appear in Pannonian inscriptions. This development, which occurred in other varieties of Vulgar Latin, sparked the palatalization of the preceding plosive in various other Romance languages. However, there is scarce attestation for this corresponding development in Pannonian Latin. Terms such as aiutrix for adiutrix may attest to the palatalization of /d/ or the loss of the phoneme prior to [j]. However, the palatalization of /t/ is only attested in five inscriptions, four of which are disputed as three are examples of non-Latin names and one belongs to the territory of Emona, which was part of the Roman province of Italia. The remaining example, a 4th-5th century inscription from Sirmium reading ...in h]oc loco p[ositi | in]nocensi[..., may contain a palatalized form of the term Innocentius, or—as Adamik argues—the standard version of the term innocens. Adamik suggests that the Romanized population of Pannonia likely dissipated due to invasions from the Huns and Germanic peoples, thereby halting the linguistic development of a Romance language in the region.

Evidence from Virunum, a city with the province of Noricum, indicates that the vowel system of the Latin of this city followed trends common to both Western and Eastern Romance. Inscriptions from Virunum attest to spellings that confuse the letters ⟨o⟩ and ⟨u⟩, such as the term annoro for annorum, indicating that the dialect of Virunum adopted the Western Romance merger of ⟨o⟩ and ⟨u⟩. However, inscriptions from Virunum do not showcase a shift from the stressed short /ú/ to ⟨o⟩, a feature characteristic of Eastern Romance. Hungarian linguist Attila Gonda argues that the dialect of Virunum was likely between both Western and Eastern Romance. There is, however, little evidence for the vowel system of rural Noricum. There are ten inscriptions from the countryside of Noricum which may indicate a shift from /o/ and /o:/ to ⟨u⟩, as demonstrated by misspellings such as munumentum for monumentum. However, eight of these inscriptions are all misspellings of name of the deity: Dolichenus, whose name is misspelt as Dulichenus. Evidence from the 4th-6th centuries CE reveals one instance of a shift from /u/ to ⟨o⟩—which is more reminiscent of Western Romance—and another inscription contains the misspelling Gutica for Gothica, displaying the Eastern Romance feature of a closer /o/ phoneme. Gonda argues that the dialect of rural Noricum likely was slowly shifting towards the Western Romance vowel system. Vowel changes are further attested in both the Latin of Pannonian and Noricum through the orthographical confusion of the letters ⟨a⟩ and ⟨e⟩, as attested in the misspelling of Seneca as Senaca. This feature may derive from a Celtic substrate, as both regions were inhabited by the Celts prior to Roman conquest. Moreover, the inscriptions from the countryside of Noricum often replaced the letter ⟨i⟩ with ⟨e⟩, such as in the terms uccipti for accepti and milis instead of miles.

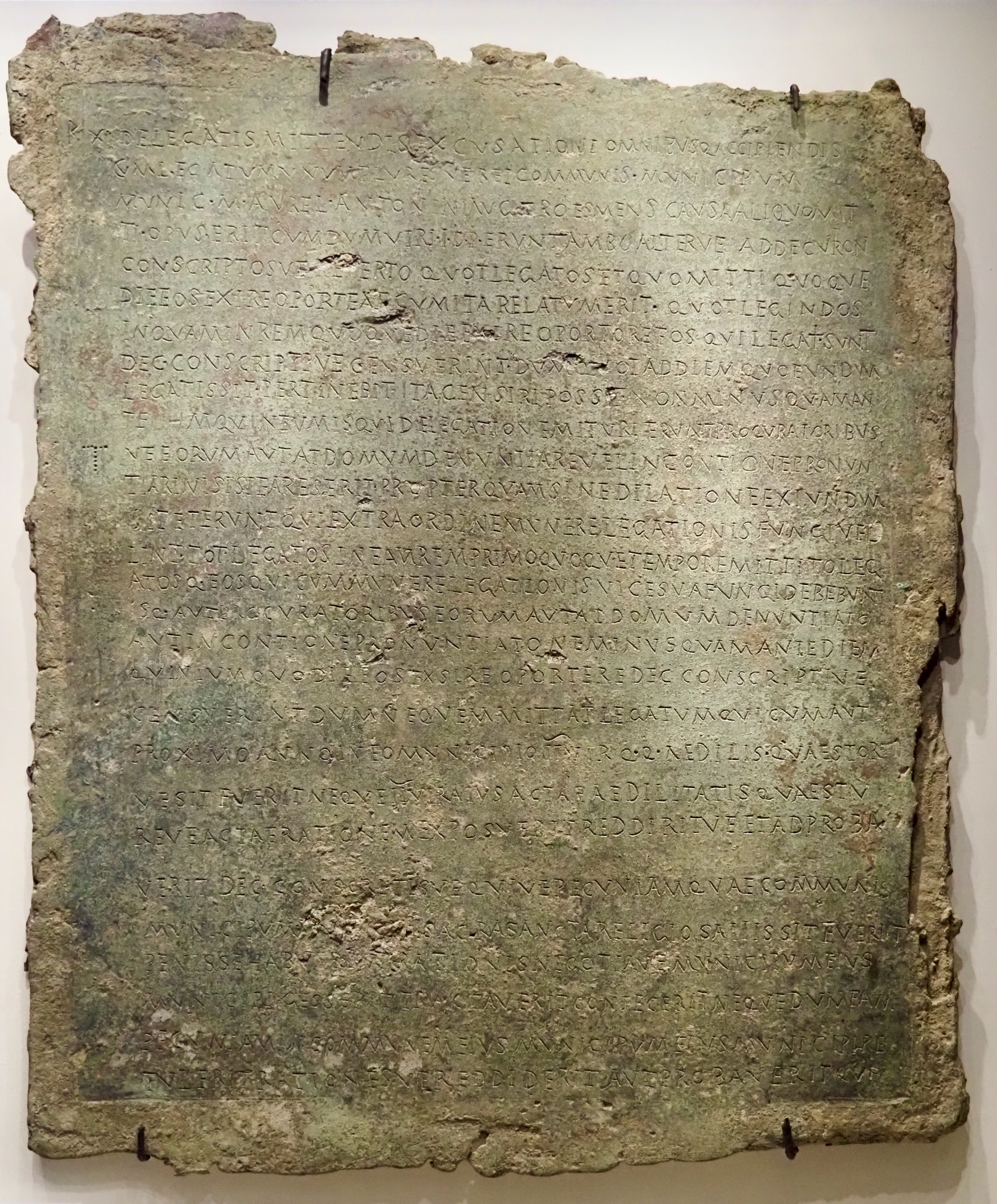
Bronze tablet of the Lex Troesmensium, a Latin legal tax from Troesmis, Romania.

According to Adamik, during the 1st century CE there is no inscriptional evidence for confusion between ⟨i⟩ and ⟨e⟩ and ⟨o⟩ and ⟨u⟩ in Moesia Superior and Moesia Inferior. Venetia et Histria and Dalmatia each reveal one example of alternation between ⟨o⟩ and ⟨u⟩, although they share ten or eleven instances of confusion between ⟨i⟩ and ⟨e⟩. Few examples of variation between ⟨i⟩ and ⟨e⟩ dated to the 1st-century CE surface in the provinces of Noricum, Pannonia Superior, and Pannonia Inferior. The frequency of this confusion increases significantly across the Danubian provinces during the 2nd and 3rd centuries CE. Adamik argues that this develop originates in southern and central Italy, noting that a greater number of inscriptions displaying this alternation appear in the city of Rome–and possibly Samnium and Apulia—during the 1st-century. The quantity of inscriptions displaying such vowel conflation from Venetia et Histria increases during the 2nd-century, before eventually surpassing Rome. Thus, Adamik argues that the vowel confusion may have spread from southern and central Italy to northern Italy, before reaching the Balkans through northern Italian regions such as Venetia et Histria.

According to Gonda, the dialects of Noricum and Pannonia showcase the distinctly Western Romance feature of degeminated double consonants, as demonstrated by an inscription from Noricum containing the term aceptus for acceptus. Inscriptions dated to the Imperial period suggest that it was common in the dialect of Noricum to omit the final /t/ and /s/, such as the terms feci for fecit and Claudiu for Claudius. Over time, the frequency of inscriptions from rural Noricum demonstrating the loss of final /s/ increases, whereas it decreases for the city of Virunum. However, the total frequency of final-/s/ omissions across the province remains greater than the majority of Roman provinces, leading Gonda to argue that Noricum was likely shifting towards a complete loss of final /s/. Gonda further suggests that—during the first three centuries CE—Noricum, Pannonia, Dalmatia, and Aquincum all belonged to a dialect group characterized by low sonorization of the voiceless plosives /p/, /t/, and /k/. However, there is still limited evidence of such sonorization, as attested by an inscription containing the term debulsori for depulsori. Desonorization is attested in the countryside of Noricum, particularly through the devoicing of final obstruents (such as in the misspelling quod as quot), a feature attested in the Gallo-Romance, Gallo-Italic, and Rhaeto-Romance families.

Other inscriptions from Potaissa, an ancient Roman castra in modern Romania, may provide evidence for a dialect of Dacian Latin. Two inscriptions from the region contain the unique form libies, which may be a variation of the more standard form libens. The linguist Eugenia Beu-Dachin proposes that this peculiarity may reflect an epenthetic extension of the /i/, although it may also derive from confusion between the 2nd and 3rd Latin conjugations. Examples of this same unique form surface throughout the Danubian provinces, with these forms appearing in inscriptions from areas such as Carnuntum—a city in Pannonia Superior—and Moesia Superior. Surviving inscriptions from Dacia often substitute ⟨i⟩ for ⟨e⟩, such as in the misspelling fecet for fecit, indicating that unstressed short /i/ evolved into close /e/. There is also evidence for the syncopation of /i/ in the Dacian dialect, particularly in orthographical errors such as the misspelt forms domnus and domna for dominus and domina. Moreover, there is persistent confusion between the graphemes ⟨i⟩, ⟨y⟩, and ⟨u⟩, such as in the form Decumum for Decimum and the word Palmura for Palmyra. The Classical Latin close-mid back rounded vowel /o/ may have shifted to an open-mid /ɔ/ and long /o:/, while the short close back rounded vowel /u/ developed into /o/. This development is evidence by inscriptions that confuse the graphemes ⟨o⟩ for ⟨u⟩, such as con, Volcano, and colitoribus for cum, Vulcano, and cultoribus respectively.

== African ==
The dialects of Latin throughout Roman Africa likely varied significantly both across each area within the province and across the social strata of the region. Punic and Berber loanwords likely entered the dialects of Roman Africa, although Adams argues that it is unlikely that any morphosyntactic features were borrowed from Punic into Latin.

== Perceived inferiority of provincial dialects ==
=== Rustic dialect ===
In the Plautine play Truculentus, the titular character—Truculentus—hails from the Italian countryside. Truculentus mispronounces the Latin term cavillator ('one who jeers') as caullator, perhaps due to the syncopation of the *-aui- found in other Latin terms such as auceps from Proto-Italic *awikaps. Later in the story, Truculentus utilizes the term rabonem instead of the Classical Latin form arrabonem ('deposit'), leading another character to mock this dialectical form, exclaiming "What beast am I to say this is? Why do you not say 'arrabonem'" (quam esse dicam hanc beluam? quin tu 'arrabonem' dicis?). To this remark, Truculentus replies that he is making "profit on the 'a', as the Praenestine conea is a ciconia" ('a' facio lucri, ut Praenestinis 'conea' est ciconia). Although Adams suggests that this description of the Praenestine dialect may not have been entirely accurate, it indicates that the population of the city of Rome viewed the dialect as abnormal and inferior. According to Quintilian, the 2nd-century BCE satirist Lucilius criticized an author named Vettius, possibly Vettius Philocomus or Quintus Vettius Vettianus, for using Praenestine words and a writer named Pollio admonished Livy for his use of dialectical elements from Patavium.

The 1st-century BCE Roman statesman Cicero claims that the people of Latium studied literature far more intensively than the residents of Rome, yet—according to Cicero—any Roman easily surpassed Quintus Valerius Soranus, whom Cicero considered most educated foreigner with Roman citizenship, in "smoothness of voice" (lenitate vocis) and pronunciation (oris pressu et sono). Cicero later claims that there is a "certain Roman accent" particular to Roman people and city, in which nothing can "offend" or "displease" (in qua nihil offendi, nihil displicere, nihil animaduerti possit) and there is no trace of "provincialism" (peregrinum). In the Ciceronian dialogue Brutus, in which Cicero recounts the history of oratory with Brutus and Titus Pomponius Atticus, Cicero claims that non-Roman orators can be equally as talented as Roman orators, yet their speeches suffer from a lack of an "urban coloring" (colorata oratio). When pressured to elaborate on the precise characteristics of such an "urban coloring", Cicero admits that he is incapable of precisely defining these dialectical variations; however, he is confident that such a distinction exists. Cicero claims that Brutus shall understand when he travels to Gaul, likely referring to his governorship of Cisalpine Gaul, where he shall "hear some words which are not current at Rome", although Cicero claims that "these [words] could be unlearned and exchanged for Roman words".

Adams argues that Cicero seemingly utilizes the term "rustic" as a pejorative remark for "unrefined" speech rather than as a reference to a genuine Latin dialect confined to a geographic region. Cicero states that "no one is so rustic as to be unwilling to run vowels together", likely equating "rusticness" with the presence of vowel hiatuses in speech. Adams suggests that such a feature of Latin, the lack of vowel hiatuses, would derive not from a specific dialect, but from a trained rhetorician intentionally avoiding the joining of a word ended by a vowel and another beginning with a vowel in speech. Cicero also associates "rusticness" with antiquity, stating that Lucius Aurelius Cotta, a plebeian tribune in 95 BCE, "is remembered because of his deliberate affectation of archaic speech in choice of words and in a rustic habit of enunciation (ipso sono quasi subrustico), although he was only of "moderate ability" and "did not advance far on the road to oratorical renown". Cicero further describes Cotta as intentionally cultivating this rustic accent, stating that he relishes in the "heavy tone" (gravitate linguae) and the "rustic pronunciation" (sonoque vocis agresti) and believes that his speech will be thought as "old-fashioned" (priscum visum) if he utilizes the rural style. Later, within the same text, Cicero advises his readership to abandon any "rustic roughness" (rusticam asperitatem) or "foreign unfamiliarity" (peregrinam insolentiam) in their vernacular.

Although Cicero typically utilizes the term rusticus to refer to this "rural" dialect, he opts for the term agrestis when describing the pronunciation of Cotta. These two terms both could mean "agrarian" or "rural", although agrestis carried more negative connotations; it was used somewhat disparagingly to refer to a stereotype of a yokel. Cicero himself distinguishes between the two words in his defense of Sextus Roscius, a farmer from Amelia, in which he states, "but this rural (rustica) life, which you call the life of the (agrestem) yokel, is the mistress of parsimony, diligence and justice". Adams concludes that Cicero was likely attempting to portray the speech of Cotta as uneducated an unsophisticated, rather than as merely characterized by rustic dialectical features. Another author, the 1st-century BCE scholar Nigidius Figulus, claims that speech appears rustic if one aspirates wrongly. However, it is likely that Figulus intended to use the term rusticus as an insult, as evidence from the city of Rome suggests that the initial aspirated /h/ was already vanishing from the common vernacular during this time, whereas it was preserved in educated and formal speech.

=== Imitation of the Roman dialect ===
Cicero claims that a certain "domestic barbarity" (barbaries domestica) could corrupt the pronunciation of Latin speakers, which may refer to the influence of foreign teachers on the dialect of their students. Quintilian advises students to begin learning Latin and avoid excessive dedication to the study of the Ancient Greek language as this could lead to the student acquiring a foreign version of Latin phonology and adopting Greek idioms into their vernacular. Cicero mentions that there was a variety of old Roman and urban "wit" (Romani veteres atque urbani sales) that is itself greater than the Attic Greek wit. Cicero considers himself to be captivated by these "witticisms" (facetiis), especially since—in his view—this native speech was being diluted by the introduction of a "foreignness" (peregrinitas) into the city. According to Cicero, the influx of immigrants from Transalpine Gaul during his lifetime was suffocating the natural dialect of the city of Rome, leaving no remaining "vestige of the ancient pleasantry" (ut nullum veteris leporis vestigium appareat).

The supposed inferiority of Gaulish accents resurfaces in the Panegyrici Latini, a collection of Latin panegyrics most of which were authored by Gallo-Roman writers. One panegyric likely composed in 313 in Trier introduces with a captatio benevolentiae proclaiming that the author is not unaware of "how inferior [their] talent is to that of the Romans" since "it comes naturally to them to speak correct and eloquent Latin", whereas the author's Gaulish dialect of Latin is "an imitation that derives from that font and source of eloquence". Another panegyric dating to 398 CE was written by the orator Latinus Pacatus Drepanius, who himself was born in the territory of the Nitiobroges by the Garonne River. The speech, which spoken before the Senate in honor of the Emperor Theodosius (r. 379–395), opens with an apology for the "rough and uncultivated uncouthness of my Transalpine speech", which he feared would "induce in [the Senators] scorn" due to their "innate and inherited facility for speaking".

Adams suggests that this introductory technique, the apology for provincial Latin and the exaltation of the native Roman tongue, likely constituted a literary topos that—in some circumstances—may have arisen from a desire to convey "linguistic modesty" rather than a genuine provincial accent. Adams further notes that the 5th-century Roman author Macrobius, within his Saturnalia, introduces with an apology should his "discourse lack the native elegance of the Roman tongue (oris Romanis)". However, Macrobius was referring to the quality of his written text, not his pronunciation. Sulpicius Severus, a 4th-century author, describes a situation in which an individual named Gallus expressed fear that his "more rustic speech" (sermo rusticior) offend the "urban ears" of his Aquitaine audience, leading another individual named Postumianus to remark that he, as a "product of the schools" (cum sis scholasticus), possessed a "scholastic artistry" (quasi scholasticus artificiose) in "apologizing for [his] ineptitude, because [he] abound[s] in eloquence" (ut excuses inperitiam, quia exuberas eloquentia.). Sulpicius implies a contrast between the dialects of rural Gaul and the more prestigious speech of well-educated persons from Aquitaine, which may relate to the literary society that existed in Burdigala at this time. Adams argues that the dialect of Aquitaine was likely situated within the middle of a hierarchy of language prestige. Although this dialect was more prestigious than the dialects of rural Gaul, the need for Pacatus to remain humble before the Senate indicates that the educated Aquitaine dialect was still perceived as inferior to that of Rome.

Gallus further claims that his speech would lack "embellishment" (fuco) and an elevated, solemn style (cothurno). This specific term, cothurnus, is associated with the Gaulish dialect by the Christian theologian St Jerome, who describes the speech of Rheticius, the Bishop of Autun, as possessing coturnus gallicus ('Gallic solemnity'). Moreover, St Jerome writes that a "reverend (sanctus) man" named Hilary gained "his height from his Gaulish buskin (Gallicano coturno)" (Note: The term cothurnus referred to a style of solemn speech and also a type of buskin worn by actors in tragic or epic plays) although he was adorned with the "flowers of Greek rhetoric" (Graeciae floribus). Gallus praises the artificiality (scholasticus artificiose) of the educated style of speech, a sentiment reflected by Jerome, who states that the Bishop of Autun spoke with "composed" or "arranged" speech (est sermo quidem conpositus). Sidonius, a 5th-century Gallic bishop, praises his brother-in-law Ecdicius for compelling the local "aristocracy" (nobilitas) to abandon the "roughness" (squamam) of their "Celtic speech" (Note: "Celtic speech" refers to a Gallo-Roman dialect, not the native Gaulish language) (sermonis celtici) and leading them to become "Latins" (Latinos), not "barbarians" (barbaros). Sidonius later comments that the "undiluted quality of the "language of Latium" (meram linguae Latiaris proprietatem) was threatened by the "rust of common barbarisms" (de trivialium barbarismorum robigine) and the "carelessness of the mob" (incuriam vulgi). He questions whether the "splendor of Roman speech" (sermonis pompa Romani) has survived anywhere in the empire, conceding that it has perished in the lands of the Belgae and the area of the Rhine river.

Martial, a 1st-century Latin poet, explicitly compliments a non-Roman—Marcella, who lived near the Jalón river in Spain—for the Romanness of her speech, stating that the "Palatine will say, if only once it hears [her], that [she is] its own" and that no "woman born in the middle of the Subura or a nursling of the Capitoline Hill will compete with you". Martial compares the speech of Marcella to that of upper-class Romans from wealthier parts of the city, such as the Palatine and the Capitoline, while distinguishing her from the residents of the Subura, who were typically lower to middle-class. Adams argues that this passage indicates that provincial Romans often sought to Romanize their accents and may have viewed the loss of provincialism in their dialect as a steppingstone into becoming more cultured. Adams further argues that the praise for Marcella and the Romanness of her dialect indicates that the typical Spaniard, even the average upper-class Spaniard, likely retained features of their provincial dialect; henceforth, the Romanized dialect of Marcella was exceptional and subject to praise.

Adams suggests that, during the Empire, the perceived superiority of the dialect of the city of Rome may have broadened to include all of Italy. Quintilian divided the corpus of Latin lemmata into either native Latin words or terms ultimately derived from foreign sources, although he states that "I [Quintilian] say nothing of Tuscan, Sabine, and even Praenestine elements" before citing instances of authors criticizing others for the usage of dialectical terms from Praeneste and Patavium. Quintilian proceeds, stating that "I can surely treat all Italian words as Roman." However, Quintilian later advises his readers to let their dialect have a "whiff of city breeding", thereby allowing their speech to appear native Roman, not simply naturalized. Adams concludes that Quintilian may have had a more favorable opinion of regional Italian dialects, although he was likely influenced by the perceived superiority of the Roman dialect. Statius, a 1st-century CE poet, praises the Romanization of an individual named Septimius Severus (who is related to the later emperor), stating that "[his] speech was not Punic, nor foreign [his] dress or [his] mind: Italian, Italian". Although Statius aimed to portray Septimius Severus as thoroughly Romanized, he associates him with Italy as a whole—not specifically the city of Rome.

Augustine, who was born in Thagaste in Roman Africa, claims that he had attempted to emulate a style of language "free from faults" yet was "still criticized by the Italians in the matter of many sounds within words" despite his own extensive education. The Italian speech Augustine contrasted himself with was likely the accents of the various native Italians he encountered during his time in Mediolanum. However, the individuals Augustine encountered included figures such as Ambrose, Manlius Theodorus, and Zenobius—who themselves were from various parts of the Empire. Thus, Adams argues it was unlikely that Augustine was describing a unique dialect of Mediolanum, but more so a general Italianness that he viewed as enviable. Adams further suggests that Augustine's admiration for the pronunciation of speakers outside of Rome, in this case in Mediolanum, itself indicates a shift from the Republic, during which only the dialect of the city of Rome was viewed as highly prestigious.

== See also ==
- Moselle Romance
- Proto-Romance language
- Vulgar Latin
