= Aquincum =

Historical Roman settlement on site of Budapest

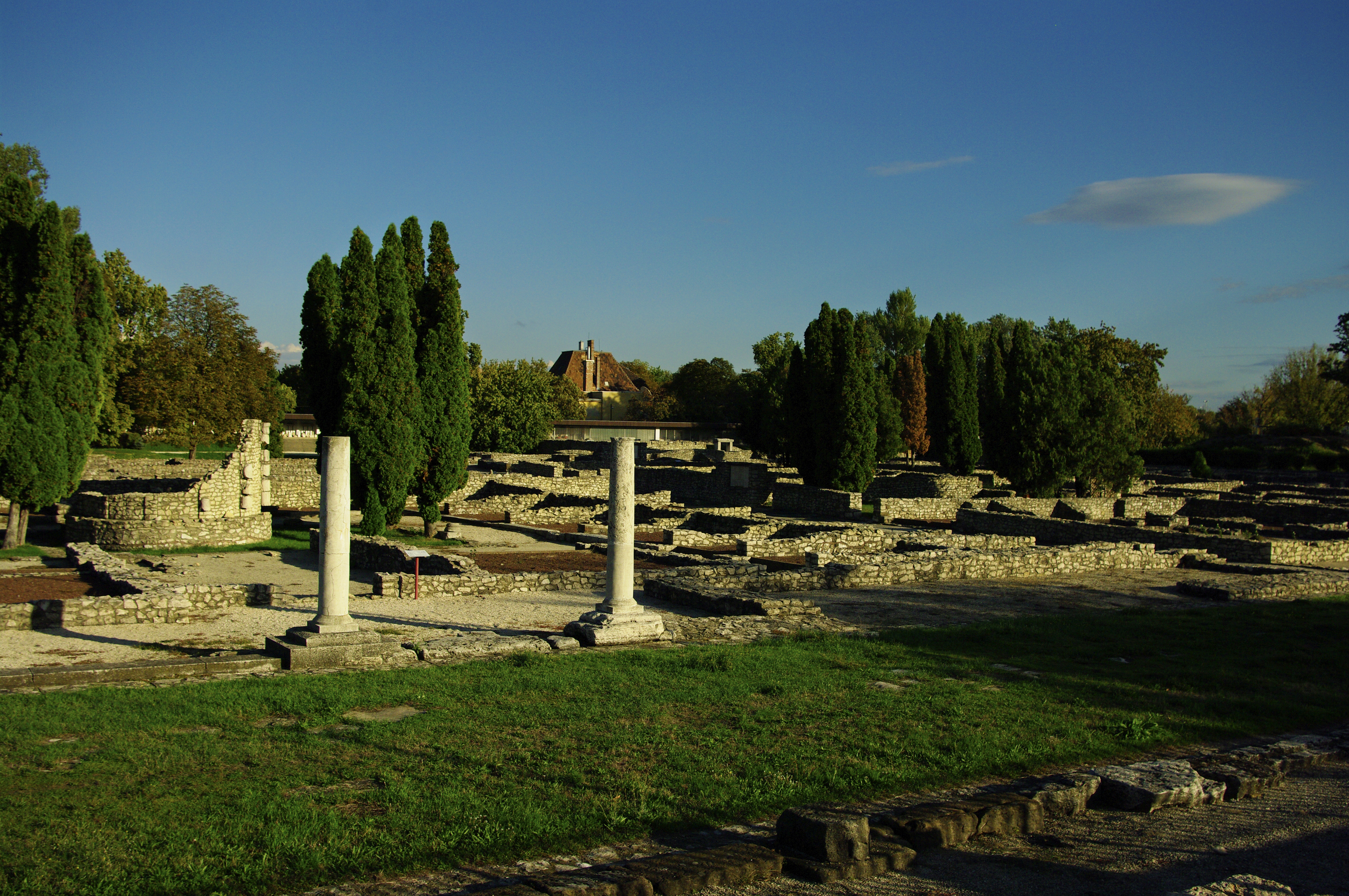
- The ruins of Aquincum

- Location within Hungary
- 47°33′51″N 19°2′58″E
- Type: Settlement
- Periods: Roman Empire
- Location: Budapest (Óbuda district), Hungary
- Region: Pannonia

History
- Built: Approximately 41–54

Aquincum (Latin: [aˈkᶣɪŋkũː], Hungarian: [ˈɒkviŋkum]) was an ancient city, situated on the northeastern borders of the province of Pannonia within the Roman Empire. The ruins of the city can be found in the Óbuda district of Budapest, the capital city of Hungary. It is believed that Marcus Aurelius wrote at least part of his book Meditations at Aquincum.

== History ==
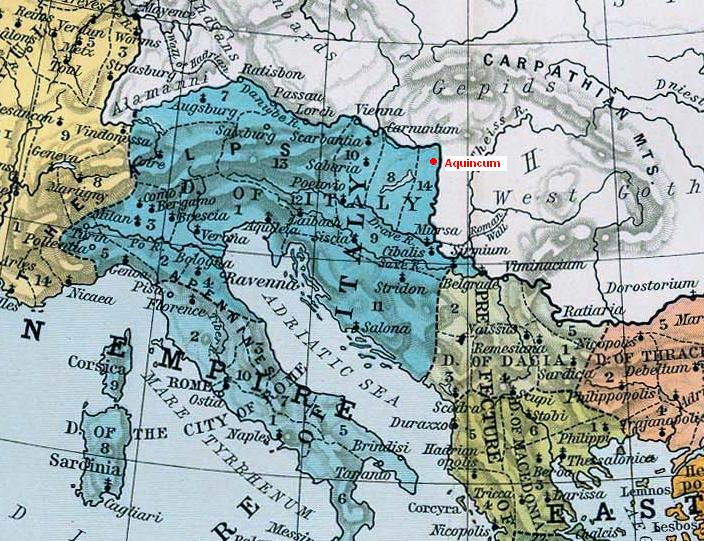
Location of the city within the Roman Empire

Aquincum was originally settled by the Eravisci, a Celtic tribe. Aquincum served as a military base (castrum), having been part of the Roman border protection system called limes. Around AD 41–54, a 500-strong cavalry unit arrived, and a Roman legion of 6,000 men (Legio II Adiutrix) was stationed there by AD 89. The city gradually grew around the fortress, and after Pannonia was reorganised by the Romans in AD 103, Aquincum became the capital city of the Roman province of Pannonia Inferior until the administrative reform of Diocletian more than a century later. Under Hadrian, the city obtained municipal status, while under Septimius Severus, Aquincum became a colonia.

As the centre of operations on the Roman frontier against the neighbouring Iazyges, Aquincum was occasionally the headquarters of emperors.

The city had at least 30,000 inhabitants by the end of the 2nd century, and covered a significant part of the area that became the Óbuda district within Budapest. Ruins from the old Roman settlement can be seen in other parts of Budapest such as Contra-Aquincum. These Roman structures were, during the 2nd and 3rd century AD, the heart of the commercial life of the Pannonia province. The excavations show evidence of the lifestyle of this period. From the beginning of the 3rd century Christianity began to spread in the city.

During the middle of the 4th century, Aquincum was under constant Sarmatian attacks from the north. The decline of the Roman Empire also affected Aquincum, and the ancient city was largely destroyed by 350 AD. Germans and the Huns invaded the region during 409 AD.

== Settlement buildings ==
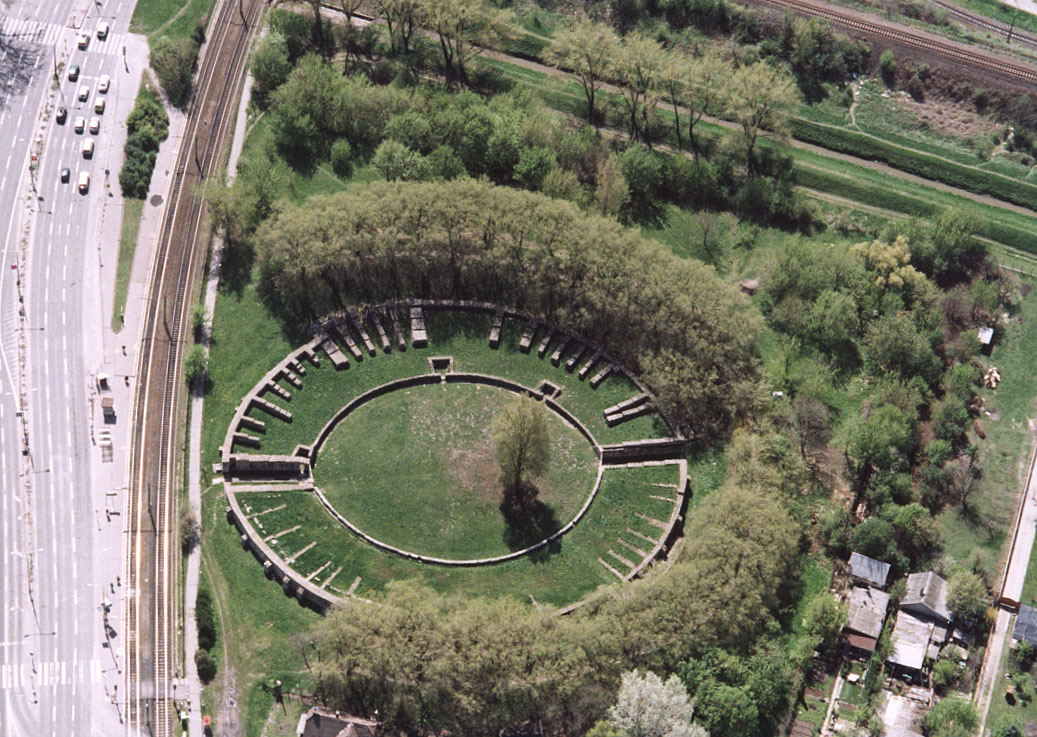
Aerial view of the Aquincum Civil Amphitheatre

People living in the settlement could enjoy the achievements of the Empire, like central heating in the houses, public baths, a Mithraeum and palaces, The most important monuments in Aquincum are the two amphitheatres: the Aquincum Civil Amphitheatre and the Aquincum Military Amphitheatre, built in the 1st century AD. These were venues for gladiatorial combats and beast fights.

== Aquincum Museum ==
Many historic artifacts from the city now appear in the Aquincum Museum. The museum exhibits a reconstruction of the hydraulic system. Roman houses and paintings that have been recovered on site. The ruins of a three-level aqueduct have been discovered around the city, many of which can be seen to this day.

== See also ==
- Aelia Sabina
