= Óbuda =

Part of District III of Budapest, Hungary

Coordinates: 47°33′N 19°02′E

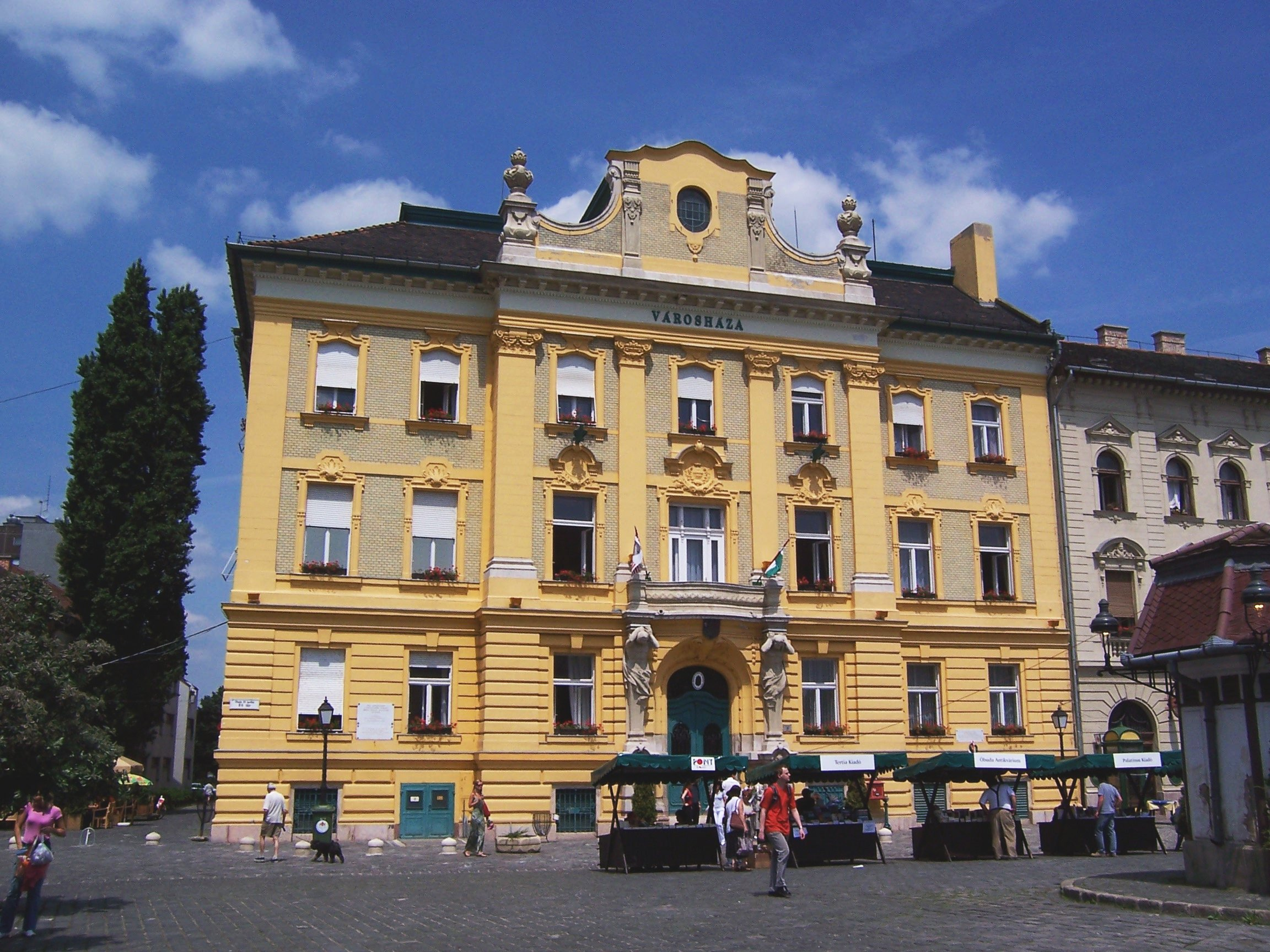
Óbuda Town Hall

Óbuda (German: Alt-Ofen, lit. 'Ur-Buda' or 'Old Buda') is, together with Buda and Pest, one of the three cities that were unified to form the Hungarian capital city of Budapest in 1873. Today, together with Békásmegyer, Óbuda forms a part of the city's third district, although the toponym is also sometimes used for northern Buda as a whole.

The neighborhood proper is centered on Fő tér beside the Szentlélek tér BHÉV station. Óbuda Island, which lies in the Danube beside Óbuda, hosts the Sziget Festival, a major annual music and cultural festival.

== History ==
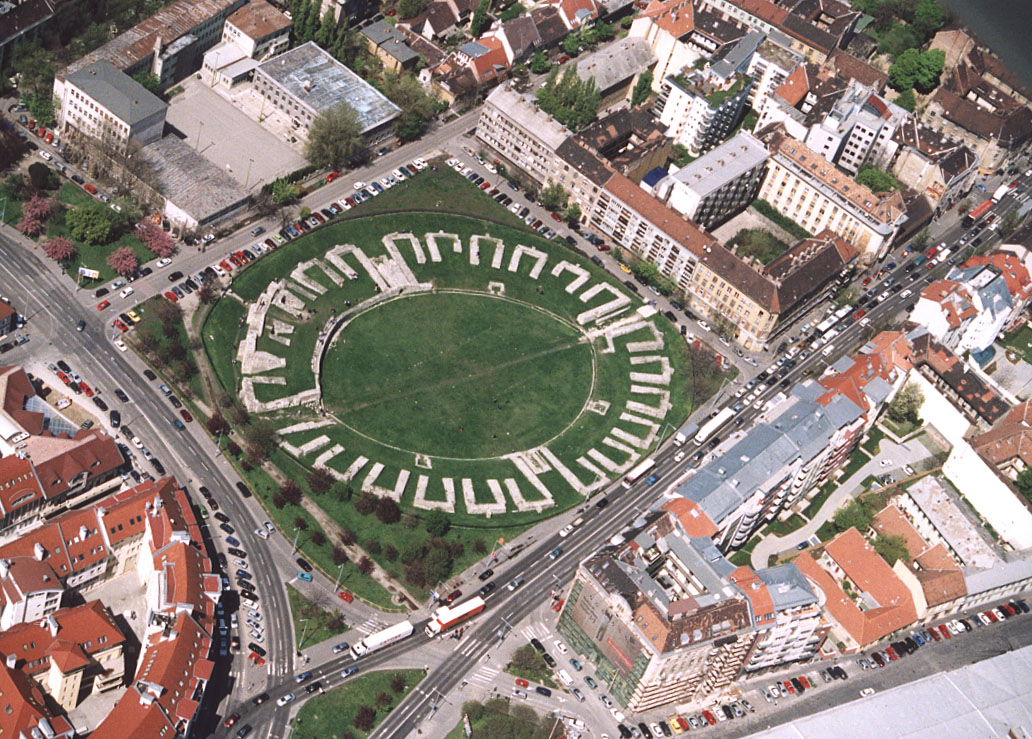
Roman amphitheatre

Settlements dating from the Stone Age have been found in Óbuda. The Romans built there Aquincum, the capital of Pannonia province. Hungarians arrived after 900 and it served as an important settlement of major tribal leaders, later kings. The site was the location of royal and ecclesiastic foundations. King Béla IV built a new capital after the 1241–42 catastrophic Mongol invasion in Buda, somewhat south of Óbuda. In the fourteenth century, Óbuda featured a convent of the Poor Clares.

The obscured historical remains of Óbuda, together with the role it played in nineteenth-century poetry, has resulted it being subject to various historical disputes.

A commemorative plaque appears on the building erected on the site of the former Jewish Elementary School in Óbuda (6 Óbuda St.) commemorating victims of the Holocaust.

== People ==
- Károly Bebo (1712–1779) – sculptor
- József Manes Österreicher (1759–1831) – physician
- Moses Kunitz (1774–1837) – rabbi
- Pál Harrer (1829–1914) – the first and only mayor of Óbuda
- Egon Orowan (1902–1989) – physicist and metallurgist
- István Bibó (1911–1979) – politician and political theorist

== Museums ==
- Aquincum Museum, small museum displays jewels, glassware, metal tools, and wall paintings relating to the lives of ancient Romans living in Aquincum. The museum's outdoor site contains remnants of the town, including courtyards, baths, a market place, shrines, large columns, sculptures, and a stone sarcophagus. Roman ruins elsewhere in Óbuda include baths that served the Roman legionnaires stationed in Aquincum, the Hercules Villa, and two amphitheatres, the Aquincum Civil Amphitheater and the larger Aquincum Military Amphitheatre.
- Kassák Museum, a branch museum of the Petőfi Literary Museum; features items relating to the life and work of the Hungarian avant garde writer Lajos Kassák (1887–1967)
- Obudai Museum, primary collection features local history; the museum also encompasses Hungary's only toy museum, and the Zsigmond Kun Flat Museum, which features folk furniture
- Museum of Hungarian Trade and Tourism
- Vasarely Museum, Zichy Palace, features work by Vasarely, as well as temporary exhibitions of other Hungarian artists

== Sport ==
- III. Kerületi TVE, football team
- 33 FC, football team
