= József Manes Österreicher =

Jewish-Hungarian physician (1759–1831)

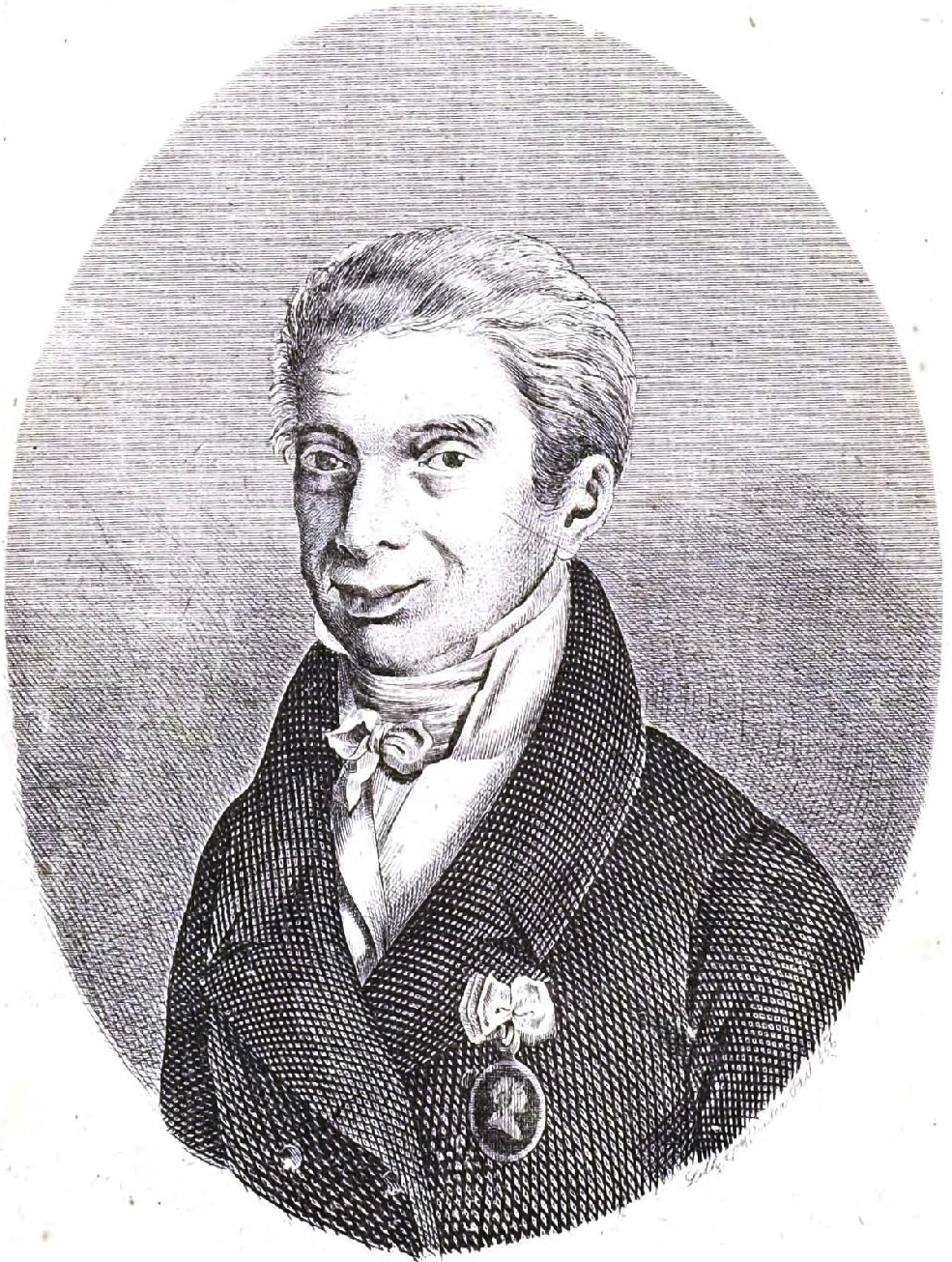
József Manes Österreicher

signature

Joseph Manes Österreicher (Hungarian: Österreicher József Manes), Jewish-Hungarian physician; born at Óbuda 1759; died at Vienna, December 14, 1831.

He studied medicine, but being Jewish, could not practise until after the promulgation of the 1782 Edict of Tolerance by Emperor Joseph II. He received his medical diploma in 1782. He was thereupon appointed physician at the hospital in his native town of Óbuda, and subsequently head physician of the county of Zala. In 1785 he became physician at the health resort of Balatonfüred.

In 1802 Österreicher went to Vienna to practise. His investigations into the adulteration of food attracted the attention of Emperor Francis, who rewarded him with handsome gifts; and on his appointment as chief physician to the imperial household in 1818, he received the great gold medal of citizenship.

Österreicher's works include:

- Analysis Aquarum Budensium Item Aquæ Sarisapiensis et Acidulæ Fürediensis, Vienna, 1781
- Nachricht von den Bestandtheilen und Kräften des Füreder Sauerbrunnens, ib. 1792
- Sal Mirabilis Nativus Hungaricus, ib. 1801
