= Moses Kunitz (rabbi) =

Hungarian rabbi (1774–1837)

Moshe Kunitz
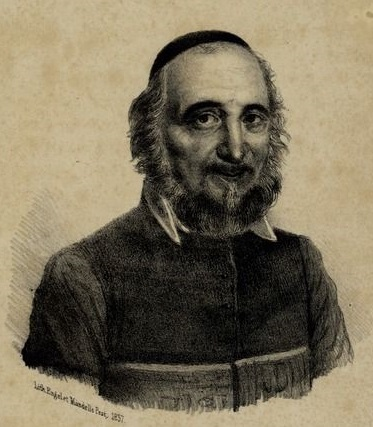
- Born: 1774; Óbuda
- Died: 2 February 1837 (aged 62–63); Óbuda

Rabbi Moshe Kunitz (sometimes: Kunitzer; 5534, 1774 – 27th of Shevat 5597, 2 February 1837) was the rabbi of Óbuda, Hungary, and a researcher of Jewish history. He was known primarily for his book "Ben Yochai" which argued for attributing the Zohar to Rabbi Shimon bar Yochai, as a response to the book "Mitpachat Sefarim" written by Rabbi Jacob Emden, who rejected this attribution.

== Early life ==
His father, Rabbi Menachem Mendel, who was a poor man. When Kunitz was ten years old, he began studying under Rabbi Benjamin Ze'ev Wolf Boskowitz, with whom he studied until after his bar mitzvah, in 1787. At the age of thirteen, he traveled on his own to Prague to the yeshiva of Rabbi Yechezkel Landau, but was unable to follow the complex lessons at the yeshiva, so he turned to Rabbi Baruch Jeitteles to accept him as a private student alongside his studies at the yeshiva. Under Jeiteles, he studied Bible with various commentaries and medieval Hebrew literature such as the book "Behinot Olam" by Jedaiah ben Abraham Bedersi. During his two years in Prague, he began writing Hebrew poetry.

== Life and scholarship ==
After two years in Prague, he went to study at the University of Breslau. After five years in Breslau, he completed his book "HaMasot HaGedolot" (The Great Journeys) (1794) on difficult passages in the Talmud, and in the year 5556 (1796) he published his book "HaOyen" which is a commentary on "Behinot Olam." In his opinion, the book "Behinot Olam" surpassed in quality all the books of its contemporaries, and therefore he endeavored to incorporate into his commentary on the book important principles from the works of Maimonides and explanations of biblical verses. Sometimes his interpretations do not align with the intention of Rabbi Jedaiah HaPenini, but from them one can discern the extent of Kunitz's knowledge even at his young age.

In the following years, he began work on the history of great Jewish figures: "Ma'aseh Chachamim" (Acts of the Wise), whose first volume dealt with the history of the family of Rabbi [Judah the Prince] (Vienna 1805); and "Ben Yochai", on the history of Rabbi Shimon bar Yochai and explanation of his statements throughout all of rabbinic literature (Vienna 1815). While working on these books, his fame began to spread, and he married the daughter of a wealthy merchant from his hometown named Rabbi Shlomo HaCohen, and joined his father-in-law's business. However, he dedicated his evenings to continuing his research and writing his works. Despite being a merchant, his name became famous among the members of the Haskalah (Jewish Enlightenment) movement as a scholar and learned person in his field. Samson Bloch received an "approbation" (haskamah) from him for his translation of the book "La-Teshu'at Yisrael" (For the Salvation of Israel) by Menasseh Ben Israel.

In 1815 he published his book "Ben Yochai". In this book he opposed claims among scholars, including rabbis such as Rabbi Jacob Emden in "Mitpachat Sefarim", regarding the false attribution of the Zohar to Rabbi Shimon bar Yochai (Rashbi). Kunitz extensively proved that Rabbi Shimon ben Yochai was indeed the author of the book. In response to this book, Solomon Judah Loeb Rapoport composed his book "Nachalat Yehudah" (The Inheritance of Judah).

His financial situation deteriorated, and by 1817 he was living in Vienna and his economic condition was at a low point. At the request of the Jewish community in Berlin, he wrote an article on the subject of changes in prayers, including permitting an organ during the Synagogue services and allowing Sephardic pronunciation of Hebrew The article, which was published in the Reform book "Nogah HaTzedek" (The Light of Justice) (Dessau 1818), alongside an article by Rabbi Aaron Chorin who was accused of being a deviant and heretic, caused criticism of him in the Torah world but made a good impression in progressive circles.

Upon his return from Vienna, his Torah work focused on preparing his halakhic writings for publication. In 1820 he published the first part of his book "HaMatzref" (The Refiner) containing 128 Halakhic responsa on various topics. Among his rulings and directives were several that were perceived as progressive and reformist: 1. Permission for Jews who served in foreign armies to eat kitniyot (legumes) on Passover. 2. A requirement that a mohel (ritual circumcisers) have medical training. 3. Obligation to study the Bible with commentators who follow the peshat (plain meaning) and with Hebrew grammar. 4. He encouraged the Jewish public to use family names, in order to be like all other nations despite rabbinic opposition to this.

He was appointed as a judge on the beth din of Pest and as rabbi of Óbuda, serving in this latter position for about ten years until his death on the 27th of Shevat 5597, 2 February 1837.

His son, Rabbi Shalom Kunitz, published the second part of the book "HaMatzref" after his father's death.

== His works and reactions to them ==
=== Toledot Rabbeinu Hakodesh ===
In the year 5565 (1805) he published his work "Ma'aseh Chachamim" (Acts of the Wise), whose first volume "Beit Rabbi" (The House of the Rabbi) dealt with the history of Rabbi Judah the Prince and his disciples. The Vilna press printed this volume at the beginning of the first volume of the Mishnah, while concealing the author's name, and only wrote that the volume was copied from the book "Beit Rabbi." Some have written that his name was omitted because of his opinions and others have written that his words were included out of ignorance of his views. In most new editions of the Vilna Mishnah, the article has been omitted.

Kunitz was accused of being aligned with the Haskala or of being sympathetic to the Reform movement.

Several ideas in the work led to opposition, such as his praise for the translations of Moses Mendelssohn.

Rabbi Reuven Elitzur criticized Kunitz's view that the cave from Beit Rabbi extended all the way to the emperor's house in Rome, contrary to the accepted interpretation that the cave extended to the house of Antoninus Pius in Tiberias. In his opinion, these words were written with the intention of causing readers to mock the words of the sages, since it would be impossible for a cave to reach Rome, and he defines the publishers of his book as placing an "idol in the sanctuary." Rabbi Meir Mazuz defended Kunitz.

=== Ben Yochai ===
In 5575 (1815) he published his book "Ben Yochai," in which he extensively proves the attribution of the Zohar to Rabbi Shimon bar Yochai, and argues against the claims of scholars regarding the false attribution. Among other things, under the name "Ma'anot u-Mitpachot" he dedicates the seventh chapter of his book to respond to Jacob Emden in "Mitpachat Sefarim" who rejected the attribution of the Zohar to Rabbi Shimon bar Yochai. In response to this book, Shlomo Yehuda Rapoport composed his book "Nachalat Yehudah" (The Inheritance of Judah).

The Chatam Sofer thought that Ben Yochai made the stronger argument and only wished it had been written by Jacob Emden.

Rabbi Yisrael Friedman of Ruzhin said: "The questions of the rabbi Rabbi Jacob Emden of blessed memory are better for me than the answers of this author." In another version it was Rabbi Tzvi Hirsh of Zidichov who said: "The objections of the genius Ya'avetz against the Zohar are better for me than the defense of Rabbi Moshe Kunitz in favor of the Zohar."

Similarly, Joseph Saul Nathansohn attacks Kunitz and defends Emden in his critique of Ben Yochai. He writes: "And behold came one prattler who said to respond to him without a righteous interpreter... Not so this aforementioned prattler whose entire intention was only so that he might glorify himself in his wisdom that he also knows the secrets of holiness, and when his hand did not find sufficient response, he said that there is another spirit in the book of Zohar that disputes the Mishnah and Talmud as will be explained before us, and God forbid, God forbid to believe in the religion of God in such words that have no foundation."

In contrast, Rabbi Akiva Eiger cites what Kunitz writes about the Judah Loew ben Bezalel (Maharal) in Ben Yochai . Rabbi David Tzvi Hilman claimed that Rabbi Akiva Eiger only relied on the book as a reference but did not attribute holiness to it. And similarly Rabbi Haim Palachi refers to Ben Yochai in his answer about whether one needs to sway during prayer. So too Rabbi Enoch Zundel ben Joseph, in his introduction to Ein Yaakov, quotes without reservation from the book 'HaOyen'.

Rabbi Yekutiel Aryeh Kamelhar related that he saw the book 'HaMatzref' in the house of Rabbi Yehoshua of Dzików with glosses by his father Rabbi Meir of Dzików. When Rabbi Kamelhar asked whether it was possible to keep a book by such an author, Rabbi Yehoshua replied that his father said: "His merit is worthwhile for what he labored to answer and resolve all the objections of the Ri'avetz [Rabbi Jacob Emden] against the holy Zohar, and composed for this purpose his book 'Ben Yochai'. In this merit he is worthy to be in his study hall, to examine it, and to write notes on it."

Rabbi Reuben Margolies demonstrated that Kunitz added to the words of Emden in order to strengthen his objections. Many criticized him for the poor quality of his writing.
