= Károly Bebo =

Hungarian sculptor, builder, and decorator

Bebo's 1749 180cm sculpture of St. Michael at St. Michael Parish Church, in Mogyoród

Károly Bebo (c. 1712 – April 1779) was an 18th-century Hungarian sculptor, builder and decorator noted for his stucco work.

Bebo worked as steward at the Óbuda estate in the service of the Counts Zichy, and around 1740 worked in decoration and furnishing as a Rococo decorator with innovative ideas. His sculpture received much praise, most notably his work on the gold and white pulpit of the Jesuit church at Székesfehérvár in 1749 and his extensive wood carving at the parish church in Óbuda which he accomplished between 1748 and 1752.

In 1749 he was also able to model a 180 cm (5 ft 10 in) sculpture of St. Michael at St. Michael Parish Church, in Mogyoród. Between 1759 and 1762 he completed a carving of the altar at Kiscell's Trinitarian church. Toward his last years from 1771 he created the memorable stucco sculptures to represent The Presentation of Mary in the Temple on the altar of St. Anne's church in Buda. He died in Óbuda in 1779.
