= Aelia Sabina =

Roman hydraulis player

Aelia Sabina (fl. 3rd century CE) was a musician who primarily played the hydraulis, an early version of the organ. She lived in Roman settlement of Aquincum, located in modern-day Budapest, Hungary.

Aelia Sabina was the wife of Titus Aelius Justus, a musician employed by the Second Auxiliary Legion of the Roman army. When she died at age 25, her husband wrote a lengthy, loving inscription on her tomb (discovered by archaeologists in the 1800s), in which he mourned her loss and praised her character and musical skill. This inscription reads:

Enclosed within this stone lies Sabina, dear and faithful wife. Excelling in the arts, she alone surpassed her husband. Her voice was sweet, her fingers plucked the strings. But she fell silent, suddenly snatched away. She lived three decades, five years fewer, alas... She herself lives on. She was a queen among the water organ players. May all who read this be happy. May the gods keep you and with a pious voice may you proclaim Fare thee well, Aelia Sabina. Titus Aelius Justus, water organist and stipendiary of the Second Auxiliary Legion erected this monument to his wife.
