= Lucius Mestrius Florus =

Lucius Mestrius Florus was a Roman senator in the first century AD and is mentioned several times by the philosopher and writer Plutarch in his work, Moralia.

== Career ==
Mestrius Florus was a Novus homo, meaning that he was the first of his family to serve in the Roman Senate. His entry into the Senate can be dated to the reign of Emperor Nero (reigned 54–68). In the Year of the Four Emperors, 69 AD, Florus stayed in Rome, and, with other Senators, accompanied Emperor Otho in the civil war against his opponent Vitellius. Plutarch emphasizes that Florus joined this military campaign unwillingly. Eventually, Otho's troops were defeated in the First Battle of Bedriacum. According to the imperial biographer Suetonius, Florus is said to have had a good relationship with Emperor Vespasian, being one of his closest confidants and a friend. It is believed that Florus served as suffect consul around the year 75 AD, however, the exact date is unknown.

In 88 AD, Mestrius Florus was appointed as Proconsul of the province of Asia. He held an office in Achaea, and met the writer Plutarch. He became his sponsor and gave him Roman Citizenship. Therefore, according to Roman customs, Plutarch adopted the gentile name Mestrius.

== See also ==
- Mestria gens
