= Rudolf Wachter =

Swiss linguist

Rudolf Wachter (born 29 November 1954) is a Swiss linguist and classical philologist. In 2007 he was elected member of the Academia Europaea.

== Life ==
Wachter studied classical philologie at the University of Zurich (lic. phil 1981, Dr. phil. 1987) and at the University of Oxford (D. Phil. 1991). Between 1991 and 1997 he worked as a lecturer at the University of Basel, where in 1996 he completed his habilitation.

Between 1997 and 2020 he served as extraordinary professor of Greek and Latin linguistics with particular reference of their Indo-European heritage. Moreover, between 1990 and 2006 he worked as a lecturer (from 2006 as visiting professor) at the University of Fribourg; between 2006 and 2020, he was also associate professor of Indo-European historical linguistics at the University of Lausanne. In 2006, he became one of the founding members of the Schweizer Orthographische Konferenz.

His research focuses on Greek and Latin linguistics, philology, and epigraphy, historical-comparative (Indo-European) linguistics as well as the history of the alphabet and of writing (especially in antiquity). He served as a consultant for the Basler Homer-Kommentar.

== Publications (selection) ==
- Altlateinische Inschriften. Sprachliche und epigraphische Untersuchungen zu den Dokumenten bis etwa 150 v. Chr. Peter Lang, Bern 1987, ISBN 3-261-03722-9 (doctoral thesis).
- Non-Attic Greek Vase Inscriptions. Oxford University Press, Oxford 2001, ISBN 0-19-814093-2 (habilitation thesis).
- Pompejanische Wandinschriften, Latin–German. Edited and translated by Rudolf Wachter. Sammlung Tusculum, De Gruyter, Berlin/Boston 2019, ISBN 978-3-11-064943-7.
