= Aquincum Civil Amphitheatre =

Ancient Roman amphitheater in Budapest

Aquincum Civil Town Amphitheater
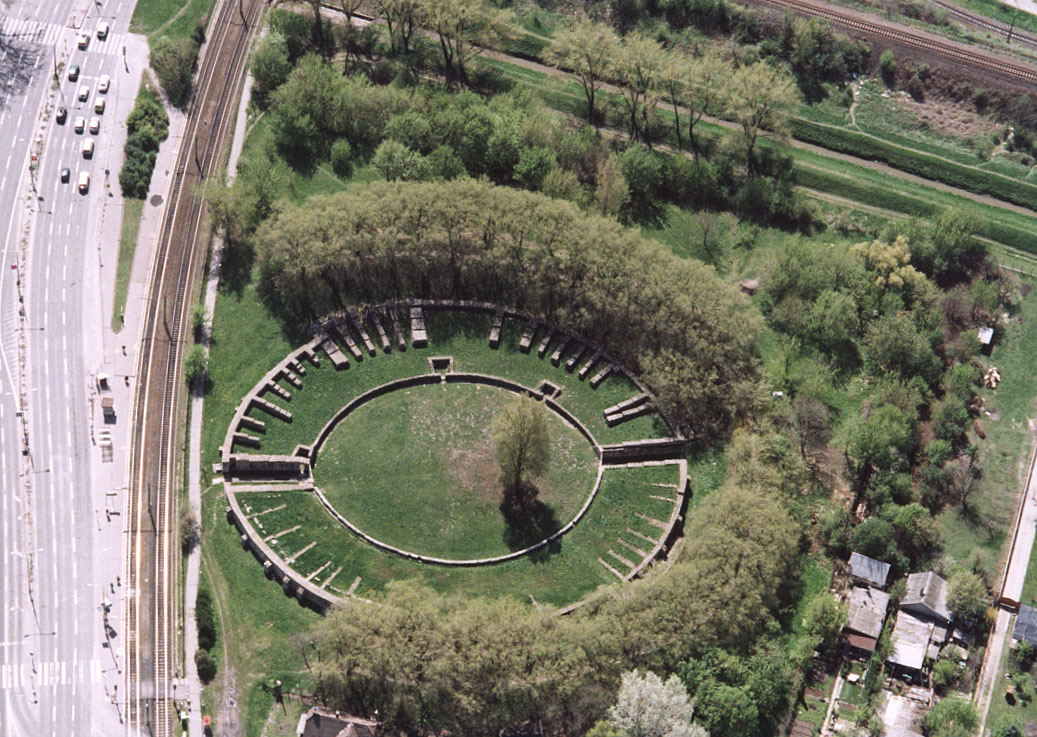
- The amphitheater from the air

- Location within Budapest

General information
- Location: Budapest, Hungary
- Coordinates: 47°34′3.396″N 19°2′52.512″E

Technical details
- Size: 86.5 m × 75.5 m (284 ft × 248 ft)

Aquincum Civil Amphitheatre is an ancient structure in Budapest, Hungary, the lesser of two located in Obuda. The other is the Aquincum Military Amphitheatre. It was built between 250 AD and 300 AD. South of the western gate is an inscription of the Greek goddess Nemesis also known as Rhamnousia/Rhamnusia.

The amphitheater was located beyond the northern wall of the ancient settlement. It underwent several renovations during the 3rd century. The building could seat between 6000 and 7000 people on its stone benches. The arena was surrounded by a 3-meter wall and spectators could enter through multiple gates. The amphitheater hosted sporting events, gladiator games and even animal hunts.
