= Aquincum Military Amphitheatre =

Ancient Roman amphitheater in Budapest

Coordinates: 47°31′58″N 19°2′20″E

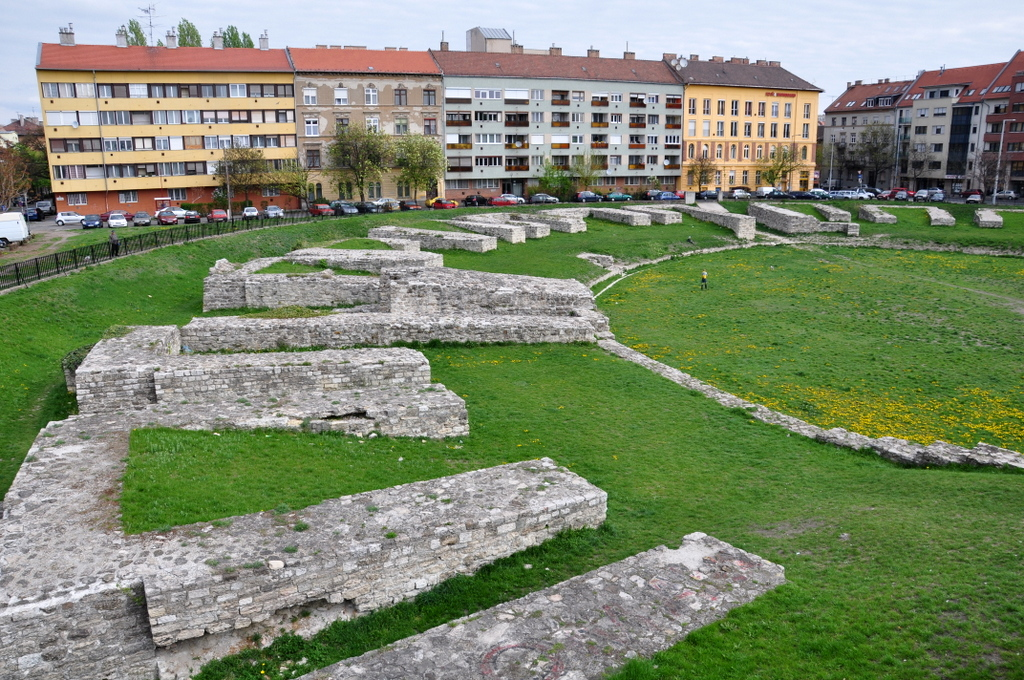

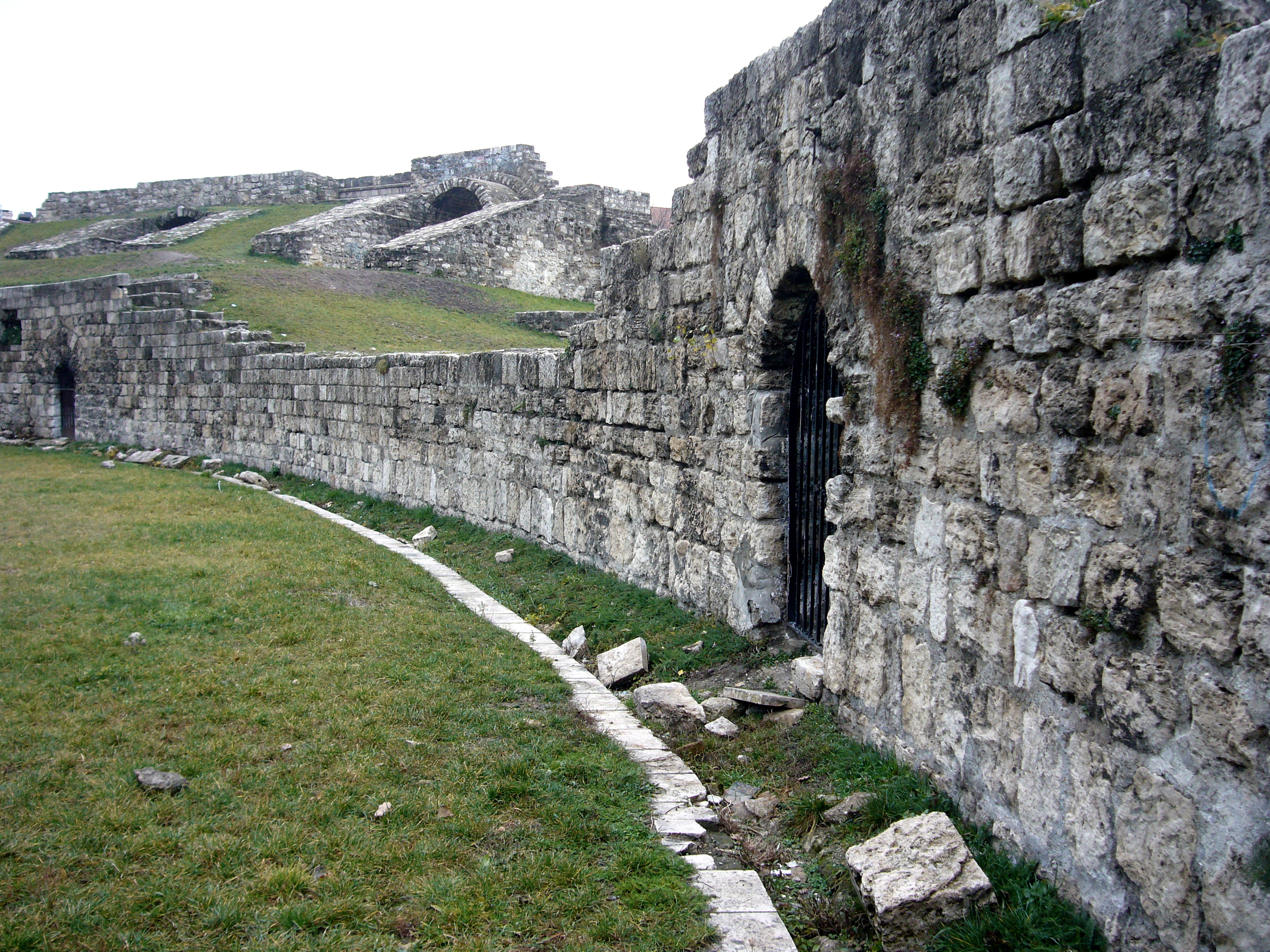

The Aquincum Military Amphitheatre is the greater of two amphitheatres in Budapest, Hungary, the other being the Aquincum Civil Amphitheatre. It is located in the Obuda district, just north near the Danube river. It was built around 145, during the reign of emperor Antoninus Pius.

== See also ==
- List of Roman amphitheatres
