= Kreka =

Wife of Attila

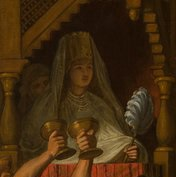
- Detail of Attila's wife in Mór Than's The Feast of Attila (1870)
- Born: Unknown location, possibly Pannonia or Greece
- Noble family: Attilid (by marriage)
- Spouse: Attila
- Issue: Ellac; Dengizich; Irnik
- Father: Unknown
- Mother: Unknown

Kreka or Hereka was the wife of Attila. She was described by Eastern Roman diplomat Priscus in his account of his stay at Attila's court in 448 or 449 AD. She and Attila had three sons: Ellac, Dengizich, and Ernak, who split among themselves what remained of Attila's empire after his death in 453.

Kreka also appears in Germanic heroic legend under the name of Helche or Herka.

== History ==
Priscus during his stay at Attila's court in 448 or 449 AD wrote "the next day I arrived at the wall of Attila's compound, carrying gifts for his wife... She had borne three children to him, of whom the eldest Ellac was ruling the Akateri and the other nations in the parts of Scythia near the Sea." He then describes the compound:

Inside the wall there were very many buildings, some built of wooden timbers carved and fitted together with an eye for style, other made of beams cleaned, scraped to straightness and placed onto logs that formed circles. The circles, starting from the ground, rose up to a height of good proportion. This is where Attila's wife dwelt. I passed the barbarians at the door and found her lying on a soft mattress. The ground was covered with woolen felt pieces for walking on. A number of male servants were gathered round her while female servants sat on the ground opposite her, dyeing some fine linens that were to be placed over the barbarians' clothing as adornment. I approached her and, after a greeting, presented her with the gifts. I then withdrew and walked to the other buildings where Attila was spending his time. I waited for Onegesius to come out since he already set out from his compound and was inside.

At the last days of his mission to Attila, Priscus and Maximinus were "invited by Kreka to dinner at the house of Adames the man who oversaw her affairs. We joined him along with some of the nation's leading men, and there we found cordiality. He greeted us with soothing words and prepared food. Each of those present, with Scythian generosity, arose and gave us each a full cup and then, after embracing and kissing the one who was drinking, received it back. After dinner, we went back to our tent and went to sleep".

Kreka also appears as a character in Germanic heroic legend, where, under the name Helche or Herka, she is the wife of Attila (Etzel/Atli) and a special confidant of the hero Dietrich von Bern in the Middle High German poems Dietrichs Flucht, the Rabenschlacht and the Old Norse Thidrekssaga. She is portrayed as having just died in the Nibelungenlied. In the Eddic poem Guðrúnarkviða III, she appears as Atli's concubine.

== Etymology ==
The name is recorded in various manuscripts of Priscus as κρέκα (κreka), ἡρέκα (hereka), ἡρέκαν (herekan), and ἠρέκαν (erekan). Some copyists dropped the ending -v (-n).

On the basis of the later Germanic forms of the name (Herche, Helche, Herkja, and Erka), Otto J. Maenchen-Helfen argues that the forms beginning with eta rather than kappa are original. He argued in favor of Willy Bang Kaup's etymology, by which it derives from Turkic *arï(y)-qan (the pure princess), (cf. Karakalpaks name Aruvkhan (aruv, "pure")).

Pavel Poucha derived Kreka or Hreka from Mongolian appellation gergei (wife), a derivation also supported by Omeljan Pritsak.

It has also been proposed that the name may be Gothic, meaning "Greek woman".

In Hungarian, Kreka is known as Réka. According to the Székely (Hungarian) tradition Réka, wife of Attila was buried at Odorheiu Secuiesc (Székelyudvarhely). The woods, the creek, the elevation (castle) there at that site is called after Réka since that time on.

== Sources ==
- Given, John P. (2015). The Fragmentary History of Priscus: Attila, the Huns and the Roman Empire, AD 430–476. Arx Publishing. ISBN 9781935228141.
- Gillespie, George T. (1973). Catalogue of Persons Named in German Heroic Literature, 700-1600: Including Named Animals and Objects and Ethnic Names. Oxford: Oxford University. ISBN 9780198157182.
- Maenchen-Helfen, Otto J. (1973). The World of the Huns: Studies in Their History and Culture. University of California Press. ISBN 9780520015968.
- Pritsak, Omeljan (1982). "The Hunnic Language of the Attila Clan" (PDF). Harvard Ukrainian Studies. IV (4). Cambridge, Massachusetts: Harvard Ukrainian Research Institute. ISSN 0363-5570. Archived from the original (PDF) on 2016-12-13.
