= Bulgars =

Turkic tribal confederation

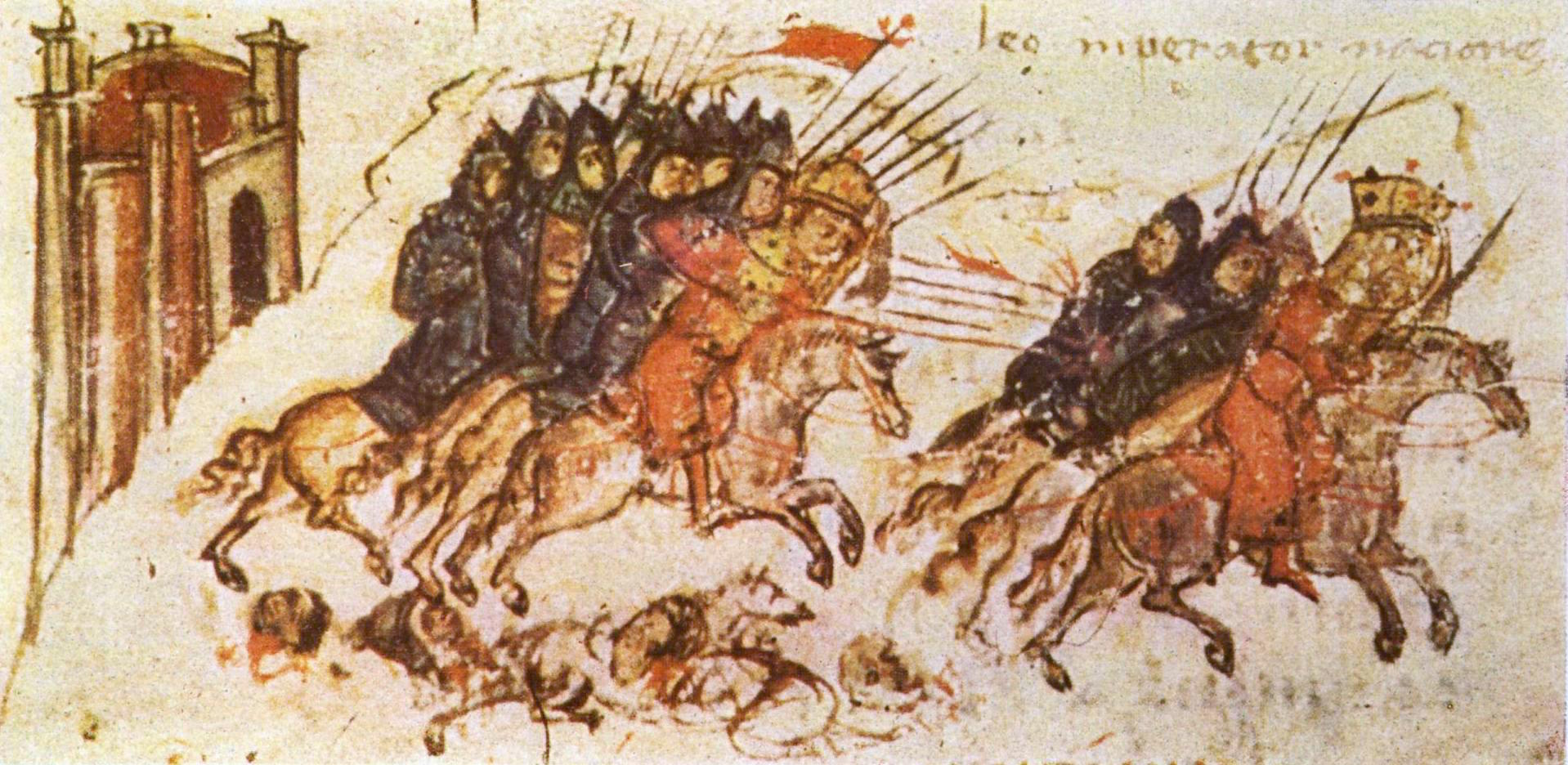
Bulgars led by Khan Krum pursue the Byzantines at the Battle of Versinikia (813)

The Bulgars (also Bulghars, Bulgari, Bolgars, Bolghars, Bolgari, Proto-Bulgarians) were Turkic semi-nomadic warrior tribes that flourished in the Pontic–Caspian steppe and the Volga region between the 5th and 7th centuries. They became known as nomadic equestrians in the Volga-Ural region, but some researchers trace Bulgar ethnic roots to Central Asia.

During their westward migration across the Eurasian Steppe, the Bulgar tribes absorbed other tribal groups and cultural influences in a process of ethnogenesis, including Iranic, Uralic, and Hunnic tribes. The Bulgars spoke a Turkic language, the Bulgar language of the Oghuric branch. They preserved the military titles, organization, and customs of Eurasian steppes as well as pagan shamanism and belief in the sky deity Tangra.

The Bulgars became semi-sedentary during the 7th century in the Pontic-Caspian steppe, establishing the polity of Old Great Bulgaria c. 630–635, which was defeated by the Khazar Khaganate in 668 AD. In 681, Khan Asparukh conquered Scythia Minor, opening access to Moesia, and established the Danubian Bulgaria – the First Bulgarian Empire, where the Bulgars became a political and military elite. They merged subsequently with established Byzantine populations, as well as with previously settled Slavic tribes, and were eventually Slavicized, thus becoming one of the ancestors of modern Bulgarians.

Most of the remaining Pontic Bulgars migrated in the 7th century to the Volga River, where they assimilated the people of the Imenkovo culture and founded Volga Bulgaria; they preserved their identity well into the 13th century. The modern Volga Tatars, Bashkirs and Chuvash people claim to have originated from the Volga Bulgars.

== Etymology and origin ==
The etymology of the ethnonym Bulgar is not completely understood and difficult to trace back earlier than the 4th century AD. Since the work of Tomaschek (1873), it is generally said to be derived from Proto-Turkic root *bulga- ("to stir, to mix; to become mixed"), which with the consonant suffix -r implies a noun meaning "mixed". Other scholars have added that bulğa might also imply "to stir, disturb, confuse" and Talat Tekin interpreted Bulgar as the active present participle "mixing" (i.e. rather than the passive perfect participle "mixed"). Both Gyula Németh and Peter Benjamin Golden initially advocated the "mixed race" theory, but later, like Paul Pelliot, considered that "to incite, rebel", or "to produce a state of disorder", i.e. the "disturbers", was a more likely etymology for migrating nomads.

According to Osman Karatay, the "mixed" etymology cannot rely on the westward migration of the Oğurs and their supposed meeting and merging with the Huns, north of the Black Sea, as the Oghurs were documented in Europe only since 463, while the Bulgars were first mentioned in 482 – an overly short time period for any such ethnogenesis to occur. However, the "mixing" in question may have occurred before the Bulgars migrated from further east, and scholars such as Sanping Chen have noted analogous groups in Inner Asia, with phonologically similar names, who were frequently described in similar terms: during the 4th century, the Buluoji (Middle Chinese b'uo-lak-kiei), a component of the "Five Barbarian" groups in Ancient China, were portrayed as both a "mixed race" and "troublemakers". Peter A. Boodberg noted that the Buluoji in the Chinese sources were recorded as remnants of the Xiongnu confederation, and had strong Caucasian elements.

Another theory linking the Bulgars to a Turkic people of Inner Asia has been put forward by Boris Simeonov, who identified them with the Pugu (僕骨, buk/buok kwət, Buqut), a Tiele and/or Toquz Oguz tribe. The Pugu were mentioned in Chinese sources from 103 BC up to the 8th century AD, and later were situated among the eastern Tiele tribes, as one of the highest-ranking tribes after the Uyghurs.

According to the Chronicle by Michael the Syrian, which comprises several historical events of different age into one story, three mythical Scythian brothers set out on a journey from the mountain Imaon (Tian Shan) in Asia and reached the river Tanais (Don), the country of the Alans called Barsalia, which would be later inhabited by the Bulgars and the Pugurs (Puguraje).

Among many other theories regarding the etymology of Bulgar, the following have also had limited support.

- an Eastern Germanic root meaning "combative" (i.e. cognate with the Latin pugnax), according to D. Detschev;
- the Latin burgaroi – a Roman term mercenaries stationed in burgi ("forts") on the limes (G. A. Keramopulos);
- a reconstructed but unattested early Turkic term meaning "five oğhur", such as *bel-gur or *bil-gur (Zeki Velidi Togan).

=== Association with other ethnonyms ===
The names Onoğur and Bulgar were linked by later Byzantine sources for reasons that are unclear. Tekin derived -gur from the Altaic suffix -gir. Generally, modern scholars consider the terms oğuz or oğur, as generic terms for Turkic tribal confederations, to be derived from Turkic *og/uq, meaning "kinship or being akin to". The terms initially were not the same, as oq/ogsiz meant "arrow", while oğul meant "offspring, child, son", oğuš/uğuš was "tribe, clan", and the verb oğša-/oqša meant "to be like, resemble".

There also appears to be an etymological association between the Bulgars and the preceding Kutrigur (Kuturgur > Quturğur > *Toqur(o)ğur < toqur; "nine" in Proto-Bulgar; toquz in Common Turkic) and Utigur (Uturgur > Uturğur < utur/otur; "thirty" in Proto-Bulgar; otuz in Common Turkic) – as 'Oğur (Oghur) tribes, with the ethnonym Bulgar as a "spreading" adjective. Golden considered the origin of the Kutrigurs and Utigurs to be obscure and their relationship to the Onogurs and Bulgars – who lived in similar areas at the same time – as unclear.

He noted, however, an implication that the Kutrigurs and Utigurs were related to the Šarağurs (šara oğur, shara oghur; "white oğhurs"), and that according to Procopius these were Hunnish tribal unions, of partly Cimmerian descent. Karatay considered the Kutrigurs and Utigurs to be two related, ancestral people, and prominent tribes in the later Bulgar union, but different from the Bulgars.

== History ==
=== Turkic migration ===
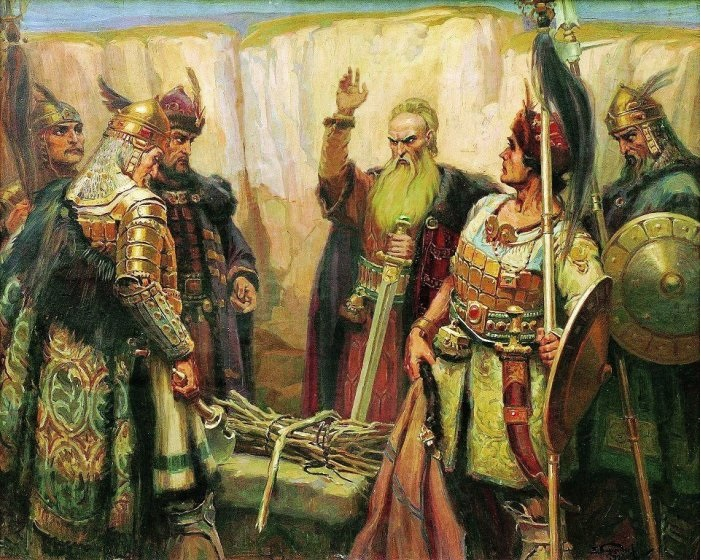
A 1926 painting depicting Kubrat (in center), ruler of Great Bulgaria.

The original homeland of the early Bulgars is still unclear. Their homeland is believed to be situated in Kazakhstan and the North Caucasian steppes. Interaction with the Hunnic tribes, causing the migration, may have occurred there, but the Pontic–Caspian steppe seems a more likely location. Some scholars propose that the Bulgars may have been a branch or offshoot of the Huns or at least Huns seem to have been absorbed by the Onogur-Bulgars after Dengizich's death. Hyun Jin Kim however, argues that the Huns continued under Ernak, becoming the Kutrigur and Utigur Hunno-Bulgars. These conclusions remain a topic of ongoing debate and controversy among scholars.

The first clear mention and evidence of the Bulgars was in 480, when they served as the allies of the Byzantine Emperor Zeno (474–491) against the Ostrogoths. Anachronistic references about them can also be found in the 7th-century geography work Ashkharatsuyts by Anania Shirakatsi, where the Kup'i Bulgar, Duch'i Bulkar, Olkhontor Błkar and immigrant Ch'dar Bulkar tribes are mentioned as being in the North Caucasian-Kuban steppes. An obscure reference to Ziezi ex quo Vulgares, with Ziezi being an offspring of Biblical Shem, is in the Chronography of 354.

The Armenian history of Movses Khorenatsi (5th century or later) speaks about two migrations of the Bulgars from the Caucasus to Armenia. The first migration is mentioned in association with the campaign of Armenian ruler Valarshak to the lands "named Basen by the ancients... and which were afterwards populated by immigrants of the Vlendur Bulgar Vund, after whose name they (the lands) were named Vanand". In fact, the name Vanand is attested prior to the appearance of the Bulgars. Grigor Khalatians and Josef Markwart connected the name Vlendur with the Olkhontor mentioned in the Ashkharatsuyts, while Stepan Malkhasiants considered it a form of the Mongolian word baghatur 'hero'.

The second migration took place during the time of the ruler Arshak, when "great disturbances occurred in the range of the great Caucasus mountain, in the land of the Bulgars, many of whom migrated and came to our lands and settled south of Kokh". While Khorenatsi discusses these migrations in the context of the 2nd century BC, it has been suggested that Khorenatsi confused events from the second half of the 4th century AD with earlier occurrences; thus, the migration may have occurred during the reign of King Arshak III of Armenia. The "disturbances" which caused them are believed to be the expansion of the Huns in the East European steppes. Dimitrov recorded that the toponyms of the Bolha and Vorotan rivers, tributaries of the Aras river, are known as Bolgaru-chaj and Vanand-chaj, and could confirm the Bulgar settlement of Armenia.

Around 463 AD, the Akatziroi and other tribes that had been part of the Hunnic union were attacked by the Šarağurs, one of the first Oğuric Turkic tribes that entered the Ponto-Caspian steppes as the result of migrations set off in Inner Asia. According to Priscus, in 463 the representatives of Šarağur, Oğur and Onoğur came to the Emperor in Constantinople, and explained they had been driven out of their homeland by the Sabirs, who had been attacked by the Avars. This tangle of events indicates that the Oğuric tribes are related to the Ting-ling and Tiele people. It seems that Kutrigurs and Unigurs arrived with the initial waves of Oğuric peoples entering the Pontic steppes. The Bulgars were not mentioned in 463.

The account by Paul the Deacon in his History of the Lombards (8th century) says that at the beginning of the 5th century in the North-Western slopes of the Carpathians the Vulgares killed the Lombard king Agelmund. Scholars attribute this account to the Huns, Avars or some Bulgar groups who were probably carried away by the Huns to the Central Europe. The Lombards, led by their new king Laimicho, rose up and defeated the Bulgars with great slaughter, gaining great booty and confidence as they "became bolder in undertaking the toils of war."

The defeated Bulgars then became subjects of the Lombards and later migrated in Italy with their king Alboin. When the army of Ostrogoth chieftain Theodoric Strabo grew to 30,000-men strong, it was felt as a menace to Byzantine Emperor Zeno, who somehow managed to convince the Bulgars to attack the Thracian Goths. The Bulgars were eventually defeated by Strabo in 480/481. In 486 and 488 they fought against the Goths again, first as allies of Byzantium, according to Magnus Felix Ennodius, and later as allies of the Gepids, according to Paul the Deacon. However, when Theoderic the Great with his Ostrogoths departed for Italy in 489, the Illyricum and Thrace were open for Bulgar raids.

In 493, according to Marcellinus Comes, they defeated and killed magister militum Julian. In 499, they crossed the Danube and reached Thrace where on the banks of the river Tzurta (considered a tributary of Maritsa) defeated a 15,000-strong Roman army led by magister militum Aristus. In 502, Bulgars again devastated Thrace as reportedly there were no Roman soldiers to oppose them. In 528–529 they again invaded the region and defeated Roman generals Justin and Baduarius. However, the Gothic general Mundus offered allegiance to Emperor Justinian I (527–565) in 530, and managed to kill 5,000 Bulgars plundering Thrace. John Malalas recorded that in the battle a Bulgar warlord was captured. In 535, magister militum Sittas defeated the Bulgar army at the river Yantra.

Ennodius, Jordanes and Procopius identified the Bulgars with the Huns in a 6th-century literary topos, in which Ennodius referred to a captured Bulgar horse as "equum Huniscum". In 505, the alleged 10,000 Hun horsemen in the Sabinian army, which was defeated by the Ostrogoths, are believed to have been Bulgars. In 515, Bulgar mercenaries were listed along with others from the Goths, Scythians and Hunnic tribes as part of the Vitalian army. In 539, two Hunnic "kinglets" defeated two Roman generals during the raid into Scythia Minor and Moesia.

A Roman army led by magister militum Ascum and Constantiolus intercepted and defeated them in Thrace; however, another raiding party ambushed and captured the two Roman generals. In 539 and 540, Procopius reported a powerful Hunnic army crossed the Danube, devastated Illyricum and reached up to the Anastasian Wall. Such large distances covered in a short time indicate they were horsemen.

Jordanes described, in his work Getica (551), the Pontic steppe beyond the Akatziri, above the Pontic Sea, as the habitat of the Bulgari, "whom the evils of our sins have made famous". In this region, the Hunni divided into two tribes: the Altziagiri (who trade and live next to Cherson) and Saviri, while the Hunuguri (believed to be the Onoğurs) were notable for the marten skin trade. In the Middle Ages, marten skin was used as a substitute for minted money.

The Syriac translation of Pseudo-Zacharias Rhetor's Ecclesiastical History (c. 555) in Western Eurasia records:

The land Bazgun... extends up to the Caspian Gates and to the sea, which are in the Hunnish lands. Beyond the gates live the Burgars (Bulgars), who have their language, and are people pagan and barbarian. They have towns. And the Alans – they have five towns... Avnagur (Aunagur, considered Onoğurs) are people, who live in tents

Then he records 13 tribes, the wngwr (Onogur), wgr (Oğur), sbr (Sabir), bwrgr (Burğa, i.e. Bulgar), kwrtrgr (Kutriğurs), br (probably Vars, also known as the Avars), ksr (Kasr; possibly Akatziri), srwrgwr (Saragurs), dyrmr (unknown), b'grsyq (Bagrasir, i.e. Barsil), kwls (unknown), bdl (probably Abdali), and ftlyt (Hephthalite) ... They are described in typical phrases reserved for nomads in the ethnographic literature of the period, as people who "live in tents, earn their living on the meat of livestock and fish, of wild animals and by their weapons (plunder)".

Agathias (c. 579–582) wrote:

...all of them are called in general Scythians and Huns in particular according to their nation. Thus, some are Koutrigours or Outigours and yet others are Oultizurs and Bourougounds... the Oultizurs and Bourougounds were known up to the time of the Emperor Leo (457–474) and the Romans of that time and appeared to have been strong. We, however, in this day, neither know them, nor, I think, will we. Perhaps, they have perished or perhaps they have moved off to very far place.

According to D. Dimitrov, scholars partially managed to identify and locate the Bulgar groups mentioned in the Armenian Ashkharatsuyts. The Olxontor Błkar is one of the variations used for the Onoğurs Bulgars, while others could be related to the ancient river names, such as the Kup'i Bulgar and the Kuban (Kuphis). The Duč'i could read Kuchi Bulkar and as such could be related to the Dnieper (Kocho). However, the Č'dar Bulkar location is unclear. Dimitrov theorized that the differences in the Bulgar ethnonym could be due to the dialect differentiations in their language.

By the middle of the 6th century, the Bulgars momentarily fade from the sources and the Kutrigurs and Utigurs come to the front. Between 548 and 576, mostly due to Justinian I (527–565), through diplomatic persuasion and bribery the Kutrigurs and Utigurs were drawn into mutual warfare, decimating one another. In the end, the Kutrigurs were overwhelmed by the Avars, while the Utigurs came under the rule of the Western Turks.

The Oğurs and Onoğurs, in the 6th- and 7th-century sources, were mentioned mostly in connection with the Avar and Turk conquest of Western Eurasia. From the 8th century, the Byzantine sources often mention the Onoğurs in close connection with the Bulgars. Agathon (early 8th century) wrote about the nation of Onoğurs Bulğars. Nikephoros I (early 9th century) noted that Kubrat was the lord of the Onoğundurs; his contemporary Theophanes referred to them as Onoğundur–Bulğars.

Constantine VII (mid-10th century) remarked that the Bulğars formerly called themselves Onoğundurs. This association was previously mirrored in Armenian sources, such as the Ashkharatsuyts, which refers to the Olxontor Błkar, and the 5th century History by Movses Khorenatsi, which includes an additional comment from a 9th-century writer about the colony of the Vłĕndur Bułkar. Marquart and Golden connected these forms with the Iġndr (*Uluġundur) of Ibn al-Kalbi (c. 820), the Vnndur (*Wunundur) of Hudud al-'Alam (982), the Wlndr (*Wulundur) of Al-Masudi (10th century) and Hungarian name for Belgrad Nándor Fejérvár, the nndr (*Nandur) of Gardīzī (11th century) and *Wununtur in the letter by the Khazar King Joseph. All the forms show the phonetic changes typical of later Oğuric (prothetic v-).

Scholars consider it unclear how this union came about, viewing it as a long process in which a number of different groups were merged. During that time, the Bulgars may have represented a large confederation including the remnants of Onoğurs, Utigurs and Kutrigurs among others.

=== Old Great Bulgaria ===
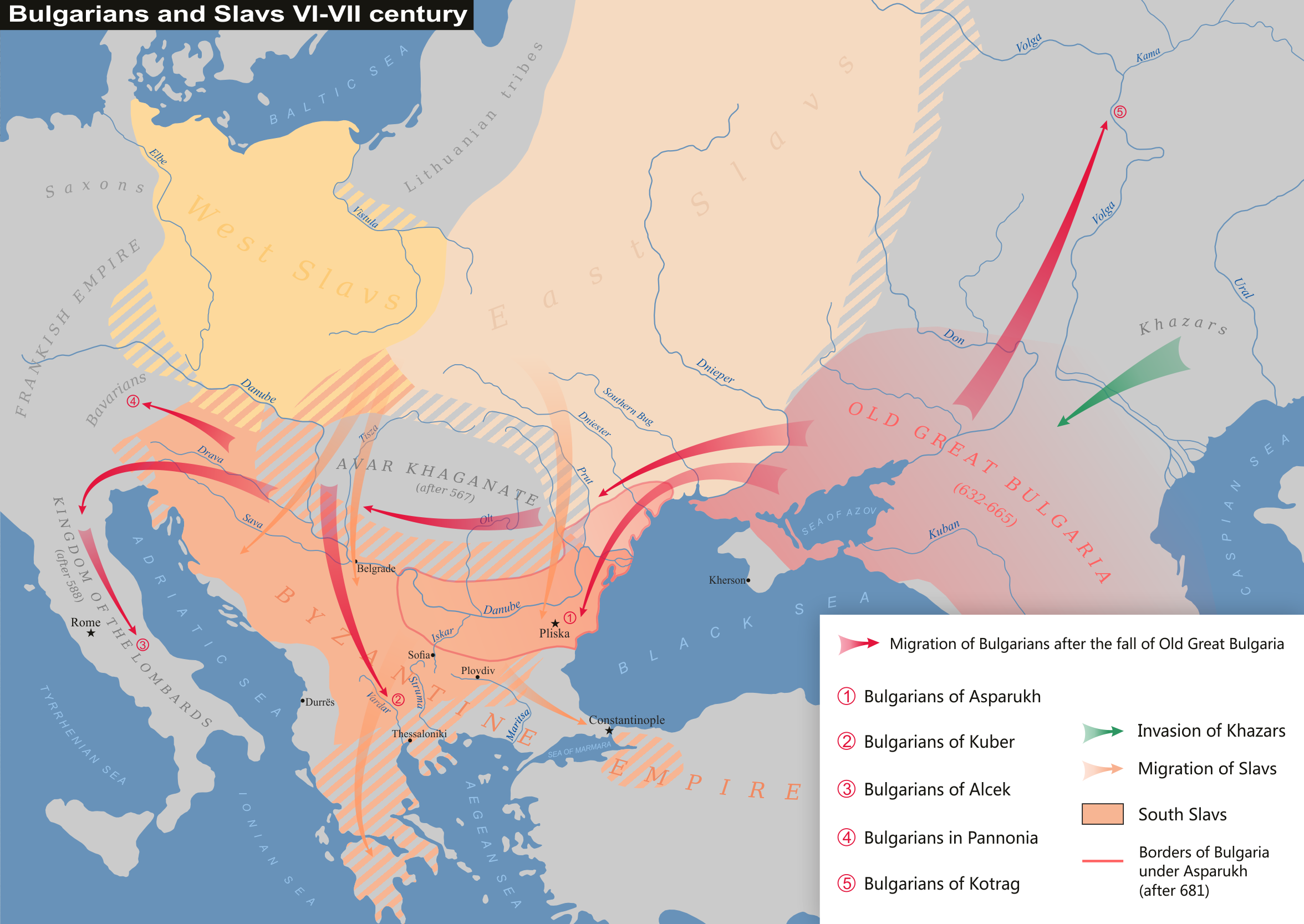
The migration of the Bulgars after the fall of Old Great Bulgaria in the 7th century.

The Turk rule weakened sometime after 600, allowing the Avars to reestablish the control over the region. As the Western Turkic Khaganate declined, finally collapsing in the middle of the 7th century, it was against Avar rule that the Bulgars, recorded as Onoğundur–Bulğars, reappeared. They revolted under their leader Kubrat (c. 635), who seems to have been prepared by Heraclius (610–641) against the Sasanian–Avar alliance. With his uncle Organa in 619, Kubrat had been baptized in Constantinople. He founded the Old Great Bulgaria (Magna Bulgaria), also known as Onoğundur–Bulğars state, or Patria Onoguria in the Ravenna Cosmography.

Little is known about Kubrat's activities. It is considered that Onogur Bulgars remained the only steppe tribes in good relations with the Byzantines. His date of death is placed between 650 and 663 AD. According to Nikephoros I, Kubrat instructed his five sons to "never separate their place of dwelling from one another, so that by being in concordance with one another, their power might thrive".

Subsequent events proved Old Great Bulgaria to be only a loose tribal union, as there emerged a rivalry between the Khazars and the Bulgars over Turk patrimony and dominance in the Pontic–Caspian steppe. Some historians consider the war an extension of the Western Turks struggle, between the Nushibi tribes and Ashina clan, who led the Khazars, and the Duolu/Tu-lu tribes, which some scholars associated with the Dulo clan, from which Kubrat and many Bulgar rulers originated. The Khazars were ultimately victorious and parts of the Bulgar union broke up.

=== Subsequent migrations ===
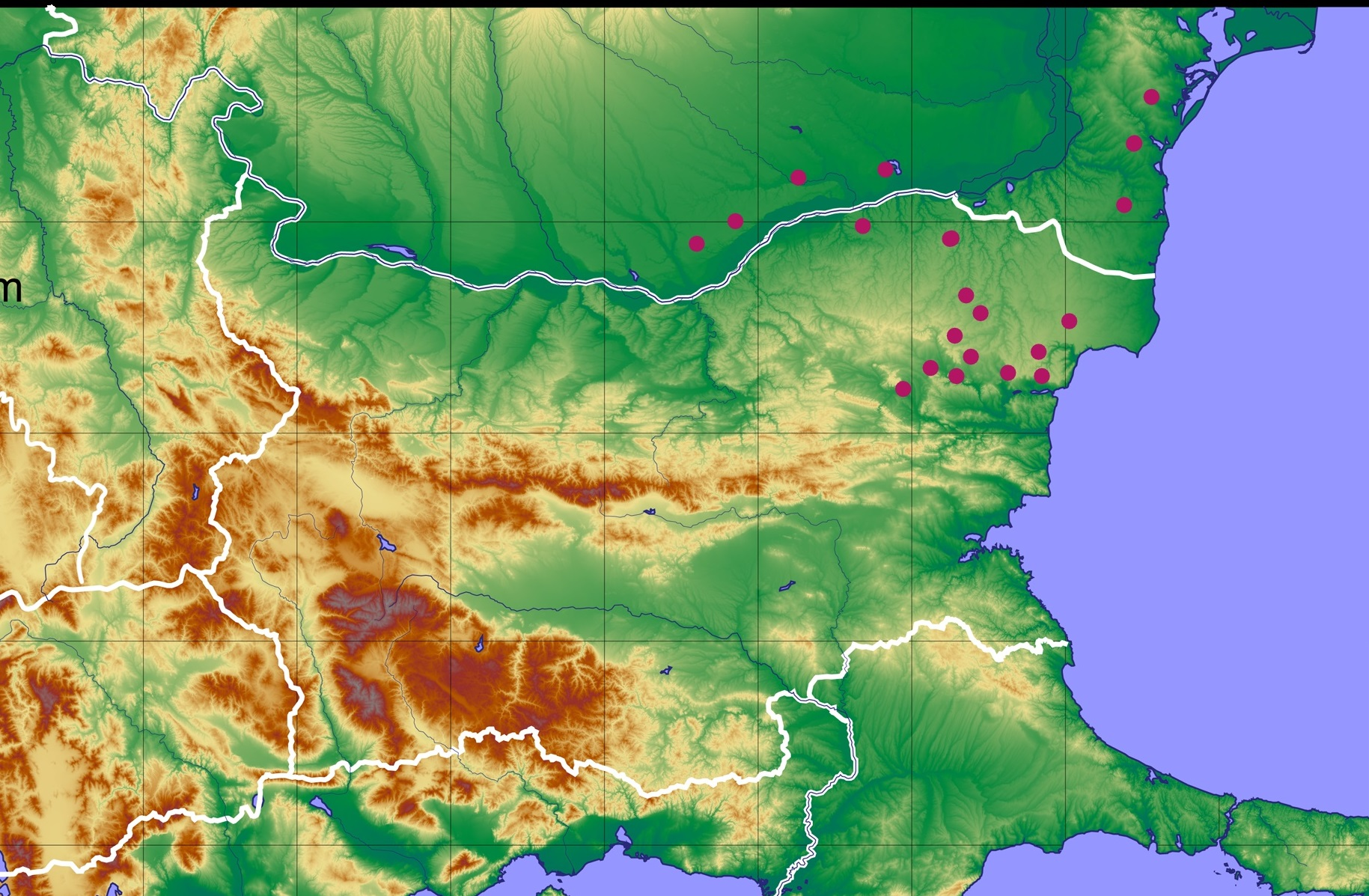
Map of the Bulgar necropolises on the Lower Danube (8–9 century AD.)

It is unclear whether the brothers' parting ways was caused by the internal conflicts or strong Khazar pressure. The latter is considered more likely. The Bulgars led by the first two brothers Batbayan and Kotrag remained in the Pontic steppe zone, where they were known as Black Bulgars by Byzantine and Rus sources, and became Khazar vassals. The Bulgars led by Kotrag migrated to the middle Volga region during the 7th and 9th centuries, where they founded Volga Bulgaria, with Bolghar as its capital.

According to Ahmad ibn Rustah (10th century), the Volga Bulgars were divided into three branches: "the first branch was called Bersula (Barsils), the second Esegel, and the third Bulgar". In 922 they accepted Islam as the official religion. They preserved their national identity well into the 13th century by repelling the first Mongol attacks in 1223. They were eventually subdued by the Mongols in 1237. They gradually lost their identity after 1431 when their towns and region were captured by the Russians.

The third and most famous son, Asparukh, according to Nikephoros I:

crossed the river Danapros and Danastros, lived in the locale around the Ister, having occupied a place suitable for settlement, called in their language ογγλον (ogglon; Slav. o(n)gl, "angle", "corner"; Turk. agyl, "yard")... The people having been divided and scattered, the tribe of the Khazars, from within Berulia (Bessarabia), which neighbors with Sarmatia, attacked them with impunity. They overran all the lands lying behind the Pontos Euxeinos and penetrated to the sea. After this, having made Bayan a subject, they forced him to pay tribute.

Asparukh, according to the Pseudo–Zacharias Rhetor, "fled from the Khazars out of the Bulgarian mountains". In the Khazar ruler Joseph's letter is recorded "in the country in which I live, there formerly lived the Vununtur (< Vunundur < Onoğundur). Our ancestors, the Khazars warred with them. The Vununtur were more numerous, as numerous as the sand by the sea, but they could not withstand the Khazars. They left their country and fled... until they reached the river called Duna (Danube)".

This migration and the foundation of the Danube Bulgaria (the First Bulgarian Empire) is usually dated c. 681. The composition of the horde is unknown, and sources only mention tribal names Čakarar, Kubiar, Küriger, and clan names Dulo, Ukil/Vokil, Ermiyar, Ugain and Duar. The Onglos where Bulgars settled is considered northern Dobruja, secured to the West and North by Danube and its Delta, and bounded to the East by the Black Sea. They re-settled in North-Eastern Bulgaria, between Shumen and Varna, including Ludogorie plateau and southern Dobruja. The distribution of pre-Christian burial assemblages in Bulgaria and Romania is considered as the indication of the confines of the Bulgar settlement.

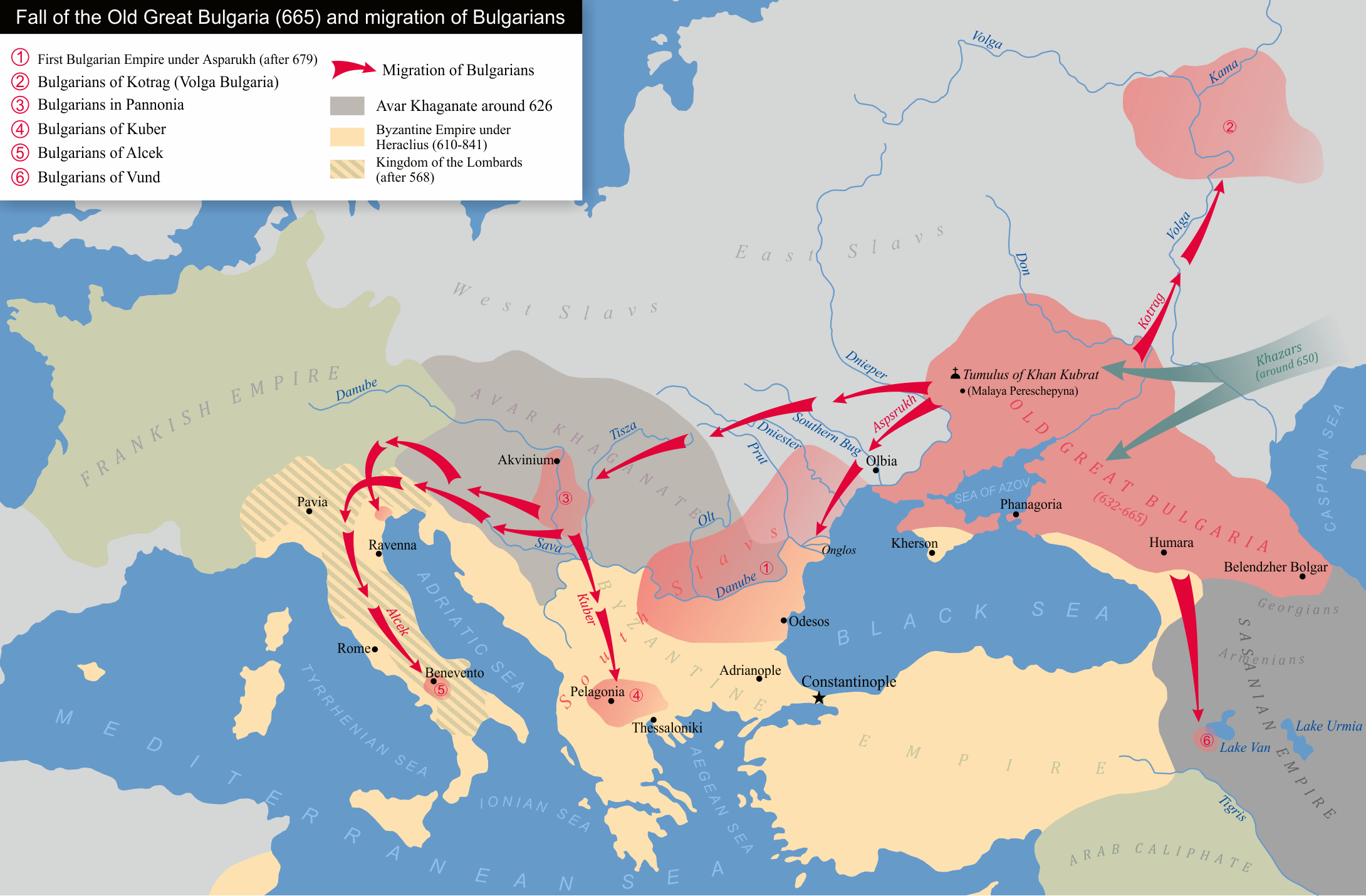
The Bulgar migrations and settlements after the decline of Old Great Bulgaria in the 7th century.

In the Balkans they merged with the Slavs and other autochthonous Romance and Greek speaking population, like the Thracians and Vlachs, becoming a political and military elite. However, the influence of the pre-Slavic population had relatively little influence on the Slavs and Bulgars, indicating their population was reduced in previous centuries. The hinterlands of the Byzantine territory were for years occupied by many groups of Slavs. According to Theophanes, the Bulgars subjugated the so-called Seven Slavic tribes, of which the Severians were re-settled from the pass of Beregaba or Veregava, most likely the Rish Pass of the Balkan Mountains, to the East, while the other six tribes to the Southern and Western regions as far the boundary with the Pannonian Avars. Scholars consider that the absence of any source recording the Slavic resistance to the invasion was because it was in their interest to be liberated from the Byzantine taxation.

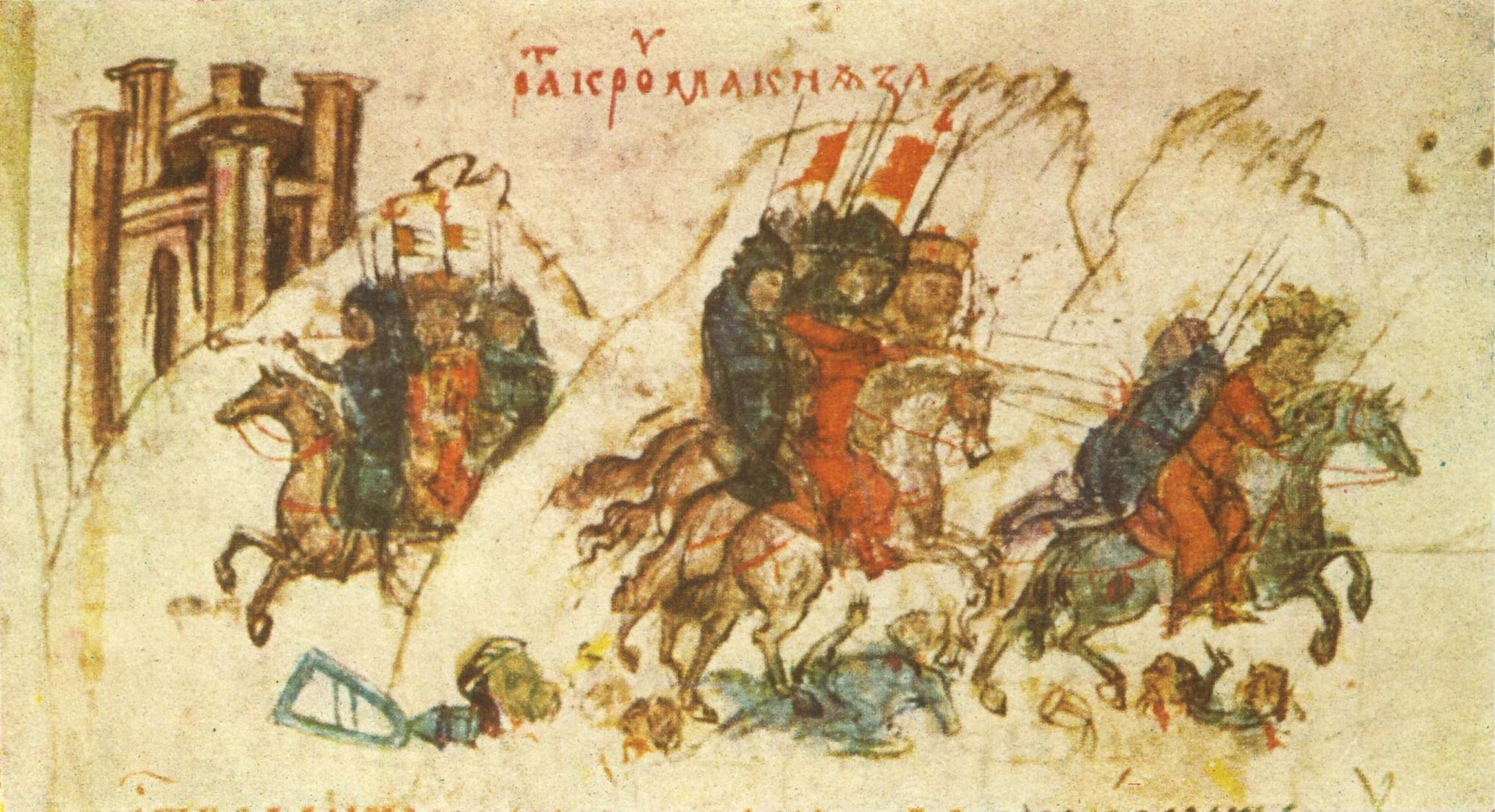
Khan Krum defeats the Byzantine Emperor Nicephorus I in the battle of the Varbitsa Pass, Manasses Chronicle

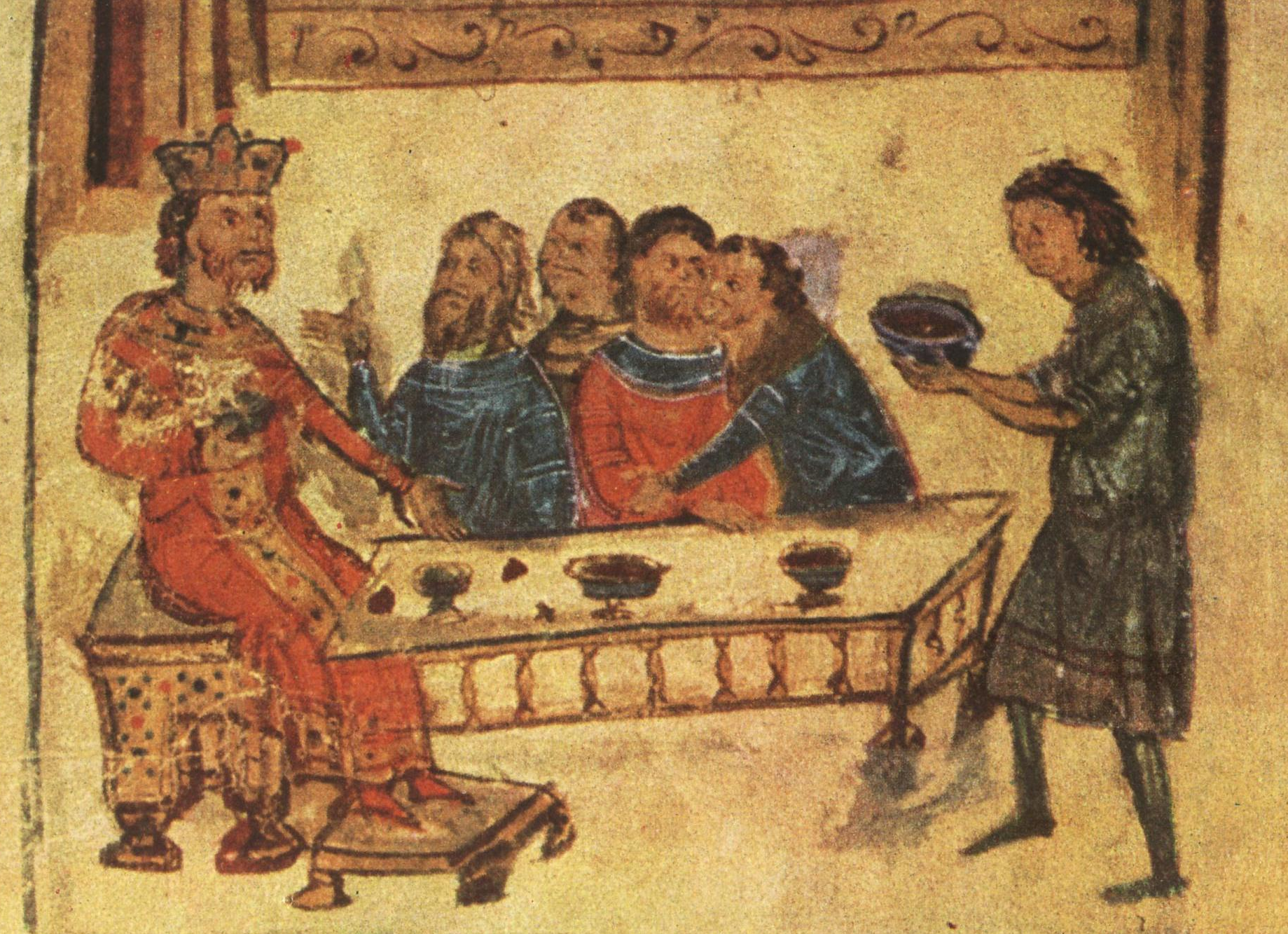
Khan Krum feasts with the skull cup of Nicephorus after the victory at the Varbitsa Pass, Manasses Chronicle

It is considered that the Slavic tribal organization was left intact, and paid tribute to the ruling Bulgars. According to Nikephoros I and Theophanes, an unnamed fourth brother, believed to be Kuber, "having crossed the river Ister, resides in Pannonia, which is now under the sway of the Avars, having made an alliance with the local peoples". Kuber later led a revolt against the Avars and with his people moved as far as the region of Thessaloniki in Greek Macedonia. The fifth brother, reported by Nikephoros I and Theophanes, "settling in the five Ravennate cities became a subject of the Romans". This brother is believed to be Alcek, who after a stay in Avar territory left and settled in Italy, in Sepino, Bojano and Isernia. These Bulgars preserved their speech and identity until the late 8th century.

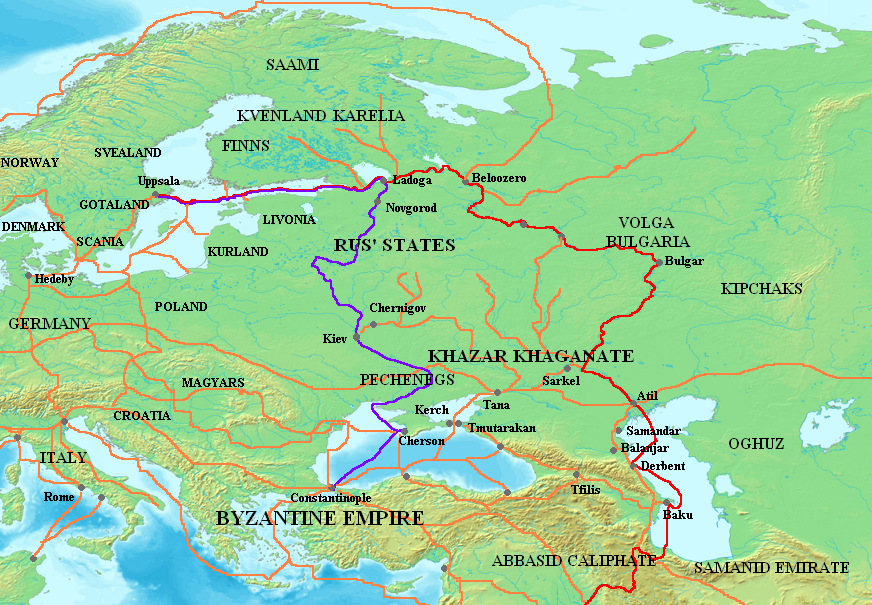
Trade routes of the Black Sea region, 8th–11th centuries

The First Bulgarian Empire (681–1018) had a significant political influence in the Balkans. In the time of Tervel (700–721) the Bulgars helped Byzantines two times, in 705 the Emperor Justinian II to regain his throne, and 717–718 defeating the Arabs during the siege of Constantinople. Sevar (738–753) was the last ruler from the Dulo clan, and the period until c. 768–772 was characterized by the Byzantino-Bulgar conflict and internal crisis. In the short period followed seven rulers from the Uokil and Ugain clan. Telerig (768–777) managed to establish a pacific policy with Byzantium, and restore imperial power.

Europe in 814

During the reign of Krum (803–814), the Empire doubled its size, including new lands in Macedonia and Serbia. He also successfully repelled the invading force of the Byzantines, as well defeated the Pannonian Avars where additionally extended the Empire size. In 865, during the reign of Khan Boris I (852–889), the Bulgars accepted Christianity as the official religion, and Eastern Orthodoxy in 879. The greatest expansion of the Empire and prosperity during the time of Simeon I (893–927) is considered as the Bulgarian Golden Age. However, from the time of Peter I (927–969) their power declined. The Hungarians, Kievan Rus' Slavs, as well Pechenegs and Cumans held many raids into their territory, and so weakened were eventually conquered in 1018 by the Byzantine Empire.

== Society ==
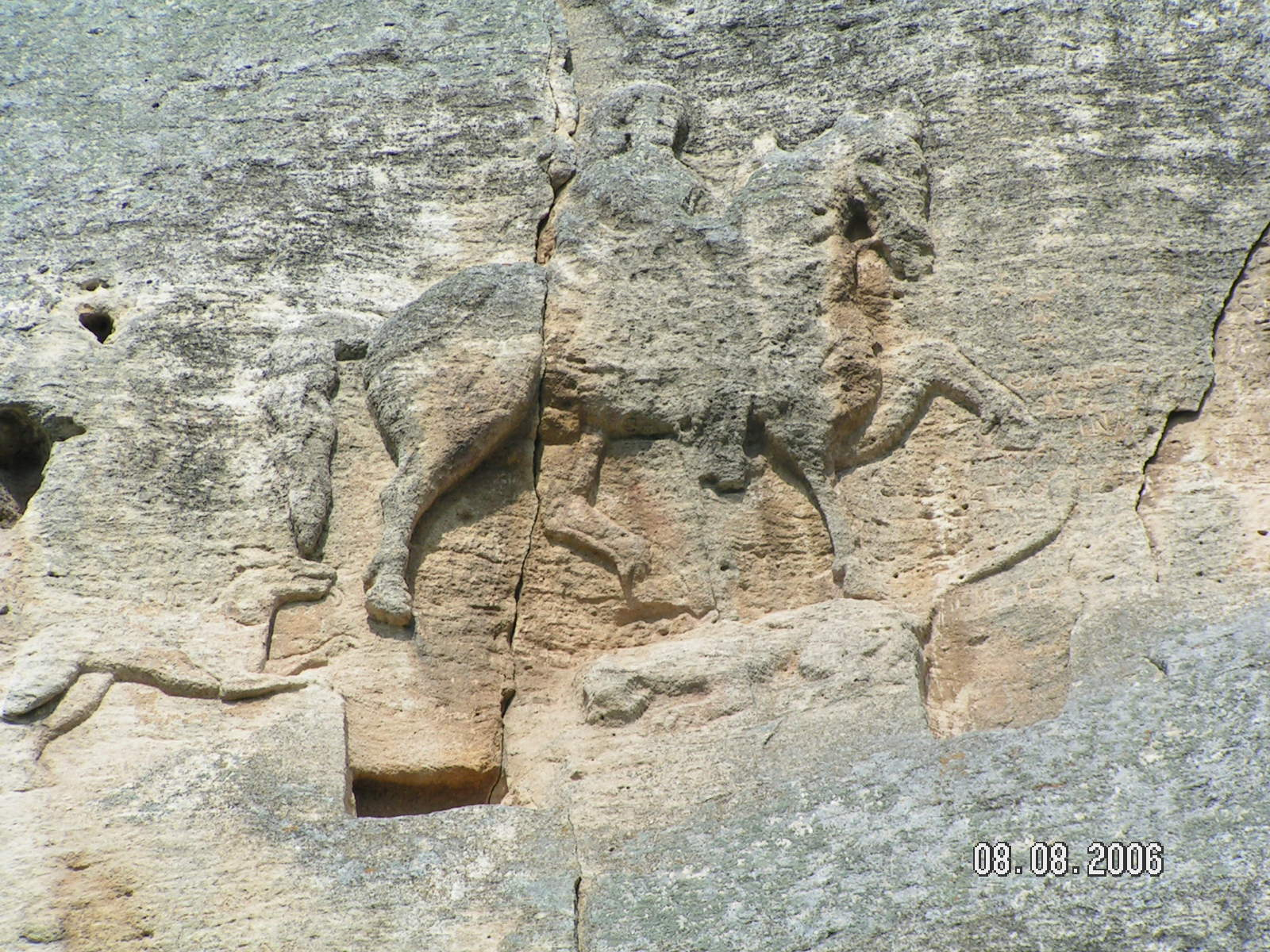
The Madara Rider, an example of Bulgar art in Bulgaria, dated to the beginning of the 8th century

Bulgars had the typical culture of the nomadic equestrians of Central Asia, who migrated seasonally in pursuit of good pastures, as well attraction to economic and cultural interaction with sedentary societies. Being in contact with sedentary cultures, they began mastering the crafts of blacksmithing, pottery, and carpentry. The politically dominant tribe or clan usually gave its name to the tribal confederation. Such confederations were often encouraged by the Imperial powers, for whom it was easier to deal with one ruler than several tribal chieftains.

In nomadic society the tribes were political organizations based on kinship, with diffused power. Tribes developed according to the relation with sedentary states, and only managed to conquer them when had social cohesion. If the raiding by the nomads had negative effect on the economic development of the region it could significantly slow down their own social and cultural development. In a nomadic state the nomad and sedentary integration was limited, and usually had vassal tribute system.

When the Bulgars arrived in the Balkans their first generations probably still lived a nomadic life in yurts, but they quickly adopted the sunken-featured building of rectangular plan and sedentary or seasonal lifestyle of the Slavs and autochthonous population. The Bulgar and Slavic settlements cannot be distinguished other than by the type of biritual cemeteries.

=== Social structure ===
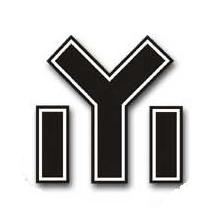
The symbol ıYı is associated with the Dulo clan and the Oghur Turkic groups as well as an Oghuz tribe Kayi

The Bulgars, at least the Danubian Bulgars, had a well-developed clan and military administrative system of "inner" and "outer" tribes, governed by the ruling clan. They had many titles, and according to Steven Runciman the distinction between titles which represented offices and mere ornamental dignities was somewhat vague. Maenchen-Helfen theorized that the titles of the steppe peoples did not reflect the ethnicity of their bearers. According to Magnus Felix Ennodius, the Bulgars did not have nobility, yet their leaders and common men became noblemen on the battle field, indicating social mobility.

Tribute-paying sedentary vassals, such as the Slavs and Greek-speaking population, formed a substantial and important part of the khanate's maintenance.

Although it was not recorded on inscriptions, the title sampses is considered to be related to the royal court. The title tabare or iltabare, which derives from the old Turkish ältäbär, like sampses is not mentioned on inscriptions, but is related to the legates and ambassadors.

The Anastasius Bibliothecarius listed Bulgarian legates at the Council at Constantinople in 869–870. They were mentioned as Stasis, Cerbula, Sundica (vagantur=bagatur), Vestranna (iltabare), Praestizisunas (campsis), and Alexius Hunno (sampsi). The ruler title in Bulgar inscriptions was khan or kanasubigi. A counterpart of the Greek phrase ὁ ἐκ Θεοῦ ἄρχων (ho ek Theou archon) was also common in Bulgar inscriptions. The kavhan was the second most important title in the realm, seemingly chief official. Some Bulgar inscriptions, written in Greek and later in Slavonic, refer to the Bulgarian rulers respectively with the Greek title archon, or the Slavic titles knyaz and tsar.

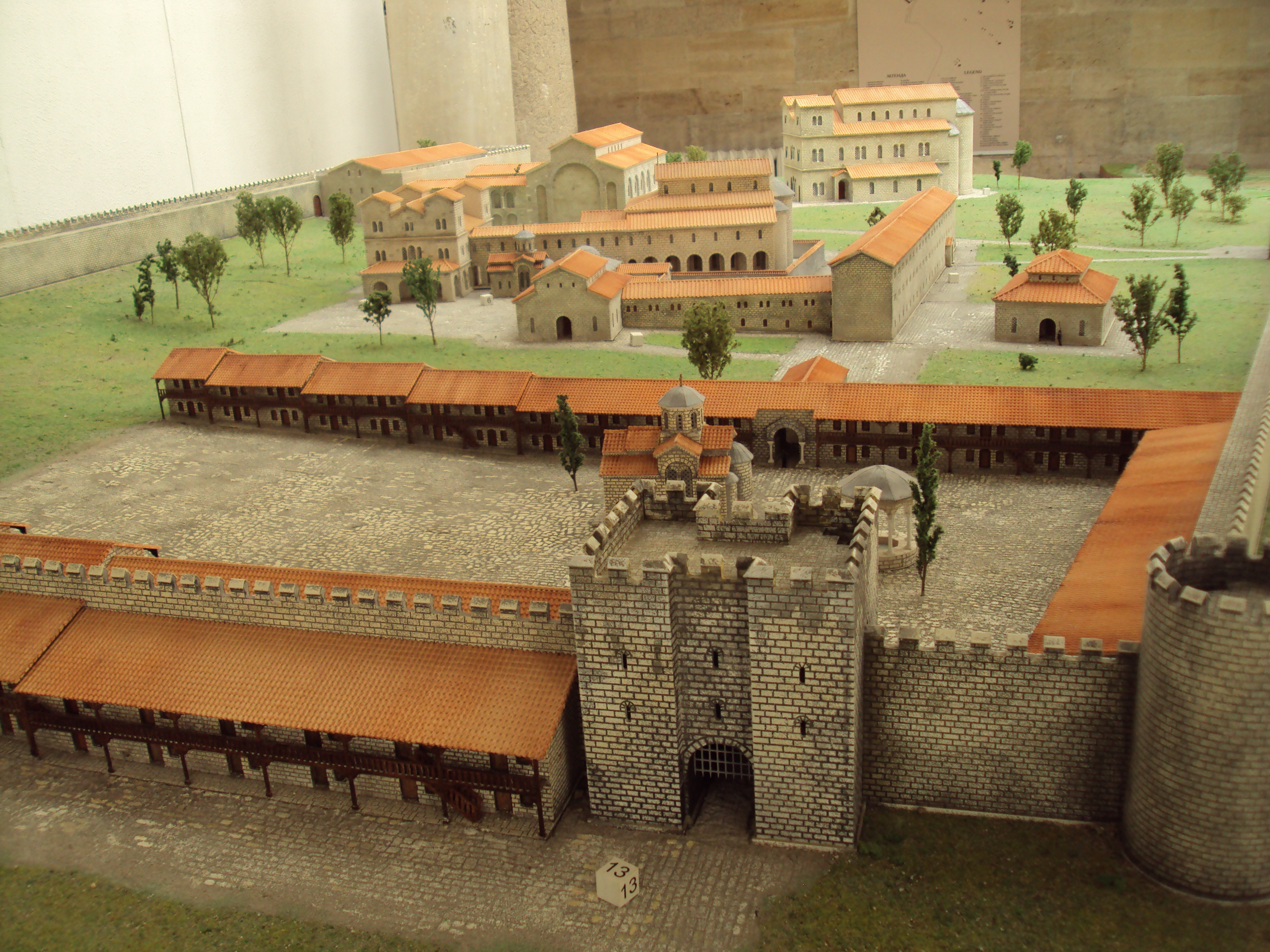
Reconstruction of the medieval landscape of Preslav

There are several possible interpretations for the ruler title, kana sybigi, mentioned in six inscriptions by the Khan Omurtag and two by Malamir. Among the proposed translations for sybigi or subigi are "lord of the army", from the reconstructed Turkic phrase syu-beg (army master) paralleling the attested Orkhon Turkic syubashi. Runciman and J. B. Bury considered ubige or uvege to be related to the Cuman-Turkic öweghü (high, glorious); "bright, luminous, heavenly"; and more recently "(ruler) from God", from the Indo-European *su- and baga-, i.e. *su-baga. Florin Curta noted the resemblance in the use of the kana sybigi with the Byzantine name and title basileus.

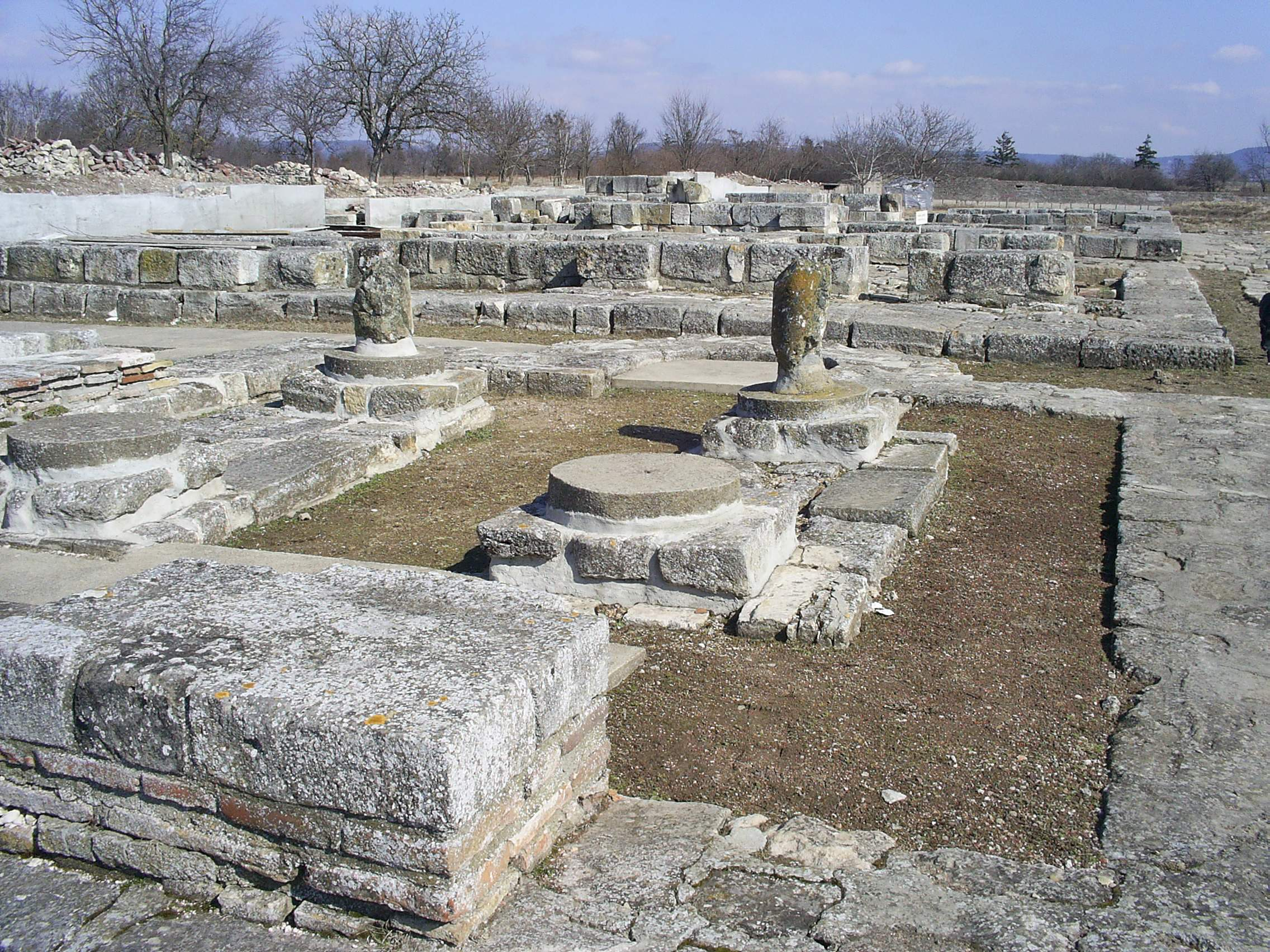
The ruins of Pliska, the first capital of Bulgaria

Members of the upper social class bore the title boila (later boyar). The nobility was divided onto small and great boilas. In the 10th century, there were three classes of boyars: the six great boilas, the outer boilas, and the inner boilas, while in the mid-9th century there were twelve great boyars. The great boilas occupied military and administrative offices in the state, as well the council where they gathered for decisions on important matters of state.

Bagaïns were the lesser class of the nobility, probably a military class which also participated in the council. The title bagatur, once as bogotor, is found in several instances within the inscriptions. It derives from Turkish bagadur (hero) and was a high military rank. The Bulgarian military commander who was defeated by the Croats in the Battle of the Bosnian Highlands (926) was called Alogobotur, which is actually a title comprised by alo (considered Turkic alp, alyp; chief) and bagatur.

There are several title associations with uncertain meaning, such as boila kavkhan, ičirgu boila, kana boila qolovur, bagatur bagain, biri bagain, setit bagain and ik bagain. Kolober (or qolovur), a rank title, is cited in two inscriptions, and it derives from the Turkish term for a guide, golaghuz. The title župan, also once as kopan in the inscriptions, was often mentioned together with the bearer's name. They were traditionally seen as Slavic chiefs. It seems to have meant "head of a clan-district", as among the South Slavs (Croats, Serbs) where it was more widely used, it meant "head of a tribe" with a high district and court function.

The title tarkhan probably represented a high military rank, similar to the Byzantine strategos, of the military governor of a province. The variations kalutarkan and buliastarkan are considered to be officers at the head of the tarkans. Curta interpreted the title zhupan tarqan as "tarqan of (all the) zhupans".

=== Religion ===
Very little is known about the religion of the Bulgars, but it is believed to have been monotheistic.

In Danube Bulgaria, Bulgar monarchs described themselves as a "ruler from God", indicating authority from a singular divine origin, and making appeals to the deity's omniscience. Presian's inscription from Philippi (837) states:

When someone seeks the truth, God sees. And when someone lies, God sees that too. The Bulgars did many favors to the Christians (Byzantines), but the Christians forgot them. But God sees.

It is traditionally assumed that the God in question was the Turkic supreme sky deity, Tengri. In the Chinese transcription as zhenli, and Turkic as Tangara and Tengeri, it represents the oldest known Turco-Mongolian word. Tengri may have originated in the Xiongnu confederacy, which settled on the frontiers of China in the 2nd century BC. The confederacy probably had both pre-Turkic and pre-Mongolian ethnic elements. In modern Turkish, the word for god, Tanrı, derives from the same root.

Tengrism apparently engaged various shamanic practices. According to Mercia MacDermott, Tangra was the male deity connected with sky, light and the Sun. The cult incorporated Tangra's female equivalent and principal goddess, Umay, the deity of fertility. Their tamgha, which can be frequently found in early medieval Bulgaria is associated with deity Tangra. However, its exact meaning and use remains unknown. The most sacred creatures to Tangra were horses and eagles, particularly white horses. Bronze amulets with representations of the Sun, horses and other animals were found at Bulgar archeological sites. This could explain the variety of Bulgars taboos, including those about animals.

Ravil Bukharaev believed that such an autocratic and monotheistic religion—henotheism, as seen in the report by Ahmad ibn Fadlan (10th century) about the Oghuz Turks, kindred to the Bulgars, made the acceptance of Islam more natural and easier in Volga Bulgaria:

If someone trouble befalls any of them or there happens any unlucky incident, they look out into the sky and summon: "Ber Tengre!". In the Turkish language, that means, "by the One and Only God!".

Another mention of Tengri is on the severely damaged Greek inscription found on a presumed altar stone near Madara, tentatively deciphered as "Khan sybigi Omurtag, ruler from god...was...and made sacrifice to god Tangra...itchurgu boila...gold". An Ottoman manuscript recorded that the name of God, in Bulgarian, was "Tängri".

The Pliska rosette dated from the Tengristic period has seven fingers representing the Classical planets

A piece of ethnographic evidence which has been invoked to support the belief that the Bulgars worshipped Tengri/Tangra is the relative similarity of the name "Tengri" to "Tură", the name of the supreme deity of the traditional religion of the Chuvash people, who are traditionally regarded as descendants of the Volga Bulgars. Nevertheless, the Chuvash religion today is markedly different from Tengrism and can be described as a local form of polytheism, due to pagan beliefs of the Volga Finns, forest dwellers of Finno-Ugric origin who lived in their vicinity, with some elements borrowed from Islam.

Paganism was closely connected with the old clan system, and the remains of totemism and shamanism were preserved even after the crossing of Danube. The Shumen plate in the archaeological literature is often associated with shamanism. In the 9th century, it was recorded that before a battle the Bulgars "used to practice enchantments and jests and charms and certain auguries". Liutprand of Cremona reported that Baian, son of Simeon I (893–927), could through magicam transform into a wolf. Clement of Ohrid reported the worship of fire and water by the Bulgars, while in the 11th century Theophylact of Ohrid remembered that before the Christianization the Bulgars respected the Sun, Moon and the stars, and sacrificed dogs to them.

Allegedly, the Dulo clan had the dog as its sacred animal. To this today Bulgarians still use the expression "he kills the dog" to mean "he gives the orders", a relic of the time when the Dulo Khan sacrificed a dog to the deity Tangra. Remains of dog and deer have been found in Bulgars graves, and it seems the wolf also had a special mythological significance. The Bulgars were bi-ritual, either cremating or burying their dead, and often interred them with personal objects (pottery, rarely weapons or dress), food, and sacred animals.

Because of the cult of the Sun, the Bulgars had a preference for the south. Their main buildings and shrines faced south, as well their yurts, which were usually entered from the south, although less often from the east. Excavations showed that Bulgars buried their dead on a north–south axis, with their heads to the north so that the deceased "faced" south. The Slavs practiced only cremation, the remains were placed in urns, and like the Bulgars, with the conversion to Christianity inhumed the dead on west–east axis. The only example of a mixed Bulgar-Slavic cemetery is in Istria near ancient Histria, on the coast of the Black Sea.

D. Dimitrov has argued that the Kuban Bulgars also adopted elements of Iranian religious beliefs. He noticed Iranian influences on the cult of the former Caucasian Huns capital Varachan (Balanjar), making a religious syncretism between the principal Turkic deity Tengri and the Iranian sun god Hvare. Dimitrov cited the work by V.A. Kuznetsov, who considered the resemblance between the layout of the Zoroastrian temples of fire and the Kuban Bulgar centre, Humarin citadel, situated 11 km to the north of the town Karachayevsk, where the pottery belonged to the Saltovo-Mayaki culture.

Kuznecov also found a connection in the plan of the Danube Bulgars sanctuaries at Pliska, Veliki Preslav, and Madara. The architectural similarities include two squares of ashlars inserted one into another, oriented towards the summer sunrise. One of these sites was transformed into a Christian church, which is taken as evidence that they served a religious function.

The view of the Parthian and Sasanian influence, which Franz Altheim also argued, is considered debatable, showing the cultural impact of the Iranian world on communities in the Pontic–Caspian steppe. Many scholars believe that the square shape, with the north–south and east–west axis of the Bulgar sacral monuments is very similar to those of Turkic khagans in Mongolia. However, that the Bulgar residence in Pliska and Palace of Omurtag were inspired by the Byzantine architecture is considered indisputable.

Eastern Orthodox Christianity had penetrated into the First Bulgarian Empire, probably via its Slavic subjects, even before Knyaz Boris I made it a state religion in 865. However, dissatisfied with the complete subordination of the Bulgarian Orthodox Church to Constantinople, the Bulgarian ruler reversed his decision, reorienting to the Roman Curia instead. The balancing act paid off, and the Ecumenical Patriarch agreed to give the Bulgarians an autonomous archbishopric in 870. Boris I's successor, Simeon I, also made ecclesiastic independence a top priority, and the autocephaly he declared in 919 and had Constantinople recognise in 927 made the Bulgarian Patriarchate the first national church to attain the same status as the Five Ancient Patriarchates.

On the other hand, as evidenced by the book Answers to the Questions of the King of the Burgar addressed to him about Islam and Unity by the Abbasid caliph Al-Ma'mun (813–833), the Bulgars remaining under Khazar dominance in the Pontic Steppe most likely adopted Islam decades prior, possibly as early as the 700s. After a major migration of "Black Bulgars" to the Volga–Kama basin in the 880s, the last major branch of the Bulgars, Volga Bulgaria, opted for Islam, as well, declaring it a state religion in 922.

== Language ==
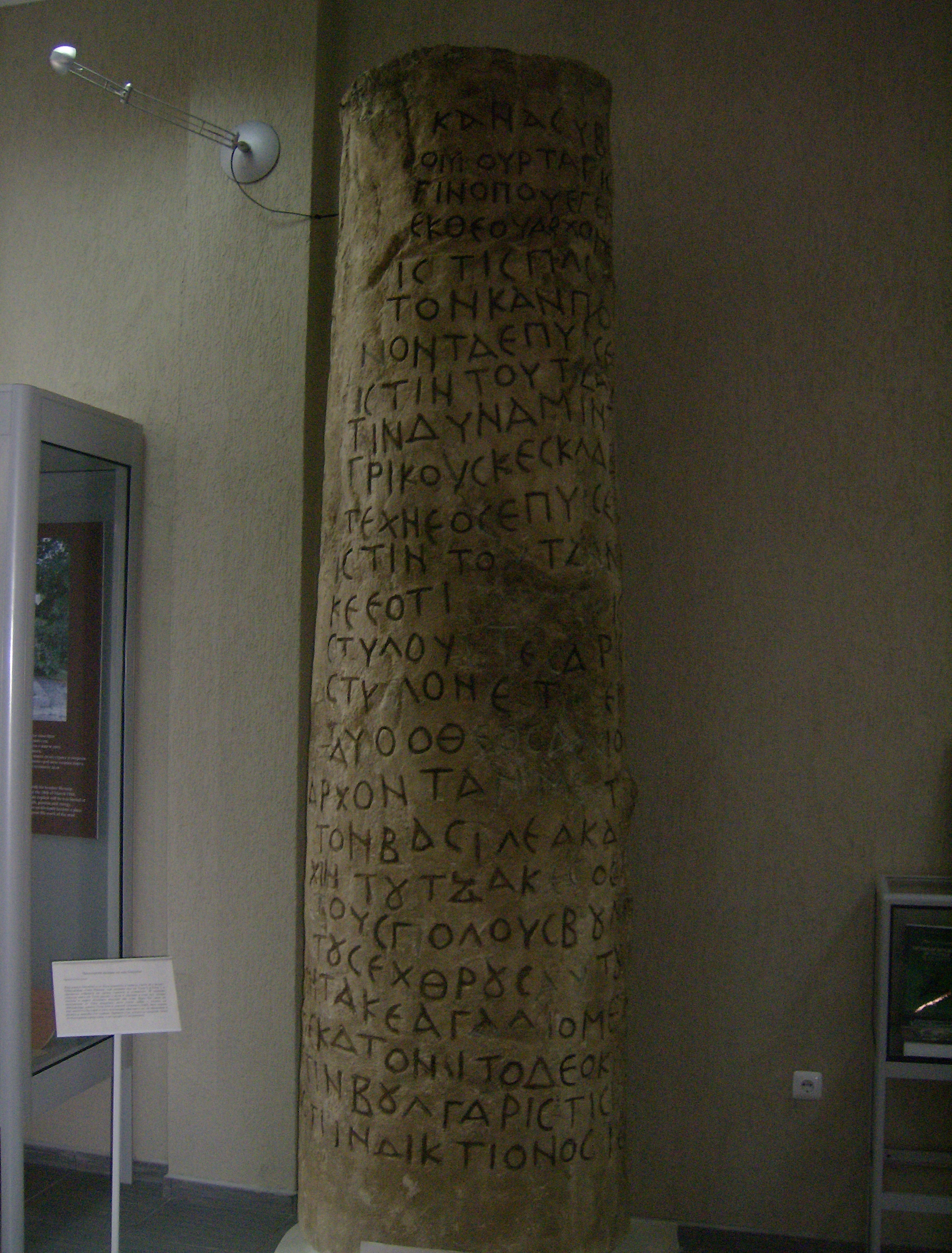
The reconstructed copy of Chatalar Inscription by Khan Omurtag (815–831). It is written in Greek, and top two lines read: "Kanasubigi Omortag, in the land where he was born is archon by God. In the field of Pliska...".

The origin and language of the Bulgars has been the subject of debate since around the start of the 20th century. It is generally accepted that at least the Bulgar elite spoke a language that was a member of the Oghur branch of the Turkic language family, alongside the now extinct Khazar and the solitary survivor of these languages, Chuvash.

Although there is no direct evidence, a group of linguists believe that Chuvash may be descendant from a dialect of Volga Bulgar while others support the idea that Chuvash is another distinct Oghur Turkic language. Some scholars suggest Hunnish had strong ties with Bulgar and to modern Chuvash and refer to this extended grouping as separate Hunno-Bulgar languages. However, such speculations are not based on proper linguistic evidence, since the language of the Huns is almost unknown except for a few attested words and personal names. Scholars generally consider Hunnish as unclassifiable.

According to P. Golden this association is apparent from the fragments of texts and isolated words and phrases preserved in inscriptions. In addition to language, their culture and state structure retain many Central Asian features. Military and hierarchical terms such as khan/qan, kanasubigi, qapağan, tarkan, bagatur and boila appear to be of Turkic origin. The Bulgar calendar within the Nominalia of the Bulgarian khans had a twelve-year animal cycle, similar to the one adopted by Turkic and Mongolic peoples from the Chinese, with animal names and numbers deciphered as Turkic. Tengri (in Bulgar Tangra/Tengre) was their supreme god.

Danubian Bulgar inscriptions were written mostly in Greek or Cyrillic characters, most commonly in Greek or Graeco-Bulgar, others in the Kuban alphabet which is a variant of Orkhon script. they apparently have a sacral meaning. Inscriptions sometimes included Slavic terms, thus allowing scholars to identify some of the Bulgar glosses. Altheim argued that the runes were brought into Europe from Central Asia by the Huns, and were an adapted version of the old Sogdian alphabet in the Hunnic/Oghur Turkic language. The custom of stone engravings are considered to have Iranic, Turkic and Roman parallels. The Madara Rider resembles work of the Sasanian rock relief tradition, but its actual masonry tradition and cultural source is unknown.

According to linguist and academician Albina G. Khayrullina-Valieva Bulgar language was the first fully proved Turkic language that came into direct contact with South Slavs. The Danubian Bulgars were unable to alter the predominantly Slavic character of Bulgaria, seen in the toponymy and names of the capitals Pliska and Preslav. They preserved their own native language and customs for about 200 years, but a bilingual period was recorded since the 9th century. Golden argued that Bulgar Turkic almost disappeared with the transition to Christianity and Slavicisation in the middle of the 9th century. When the ruling class abandoned its native language and adopted Slavic, according to Jean W. Sedlar, it was so complete that no trace of Turkic speech patterns remained in Old Slavic texts. The Bulgarian Christian Church used the Slavic dialect from Macedonia.

Among Bulgarian academics, notably Petar Dobrev, a hypothesis linking the Bulgar language to the Iranic languages (especially Pamir) has been popular since the 1990s. Most proponents still assume an intermediate stance, proposing certain signs of Iranic influence on a Turkic substrate. The names Asparukh and Bezmer from the Nominalia list, for example, were established as being of Iranic origin. Other Bulgarian scholars actively oppose the "Iranic hypothesis". According to Raymond Detrez, the Iranian theory is rooted in the periods of anti-Turkish sentiment in Bulgaria and is ideologically motivated. Since 1989, anti-Turkish rhetoric is now reflected in the theories that challenge the thesis of the proto-Bulgars' Turkic origin. Alongside the Iranian or Aryan theory, there appeared arguments favoring an autochthonous origin.

== Ethnicity ==
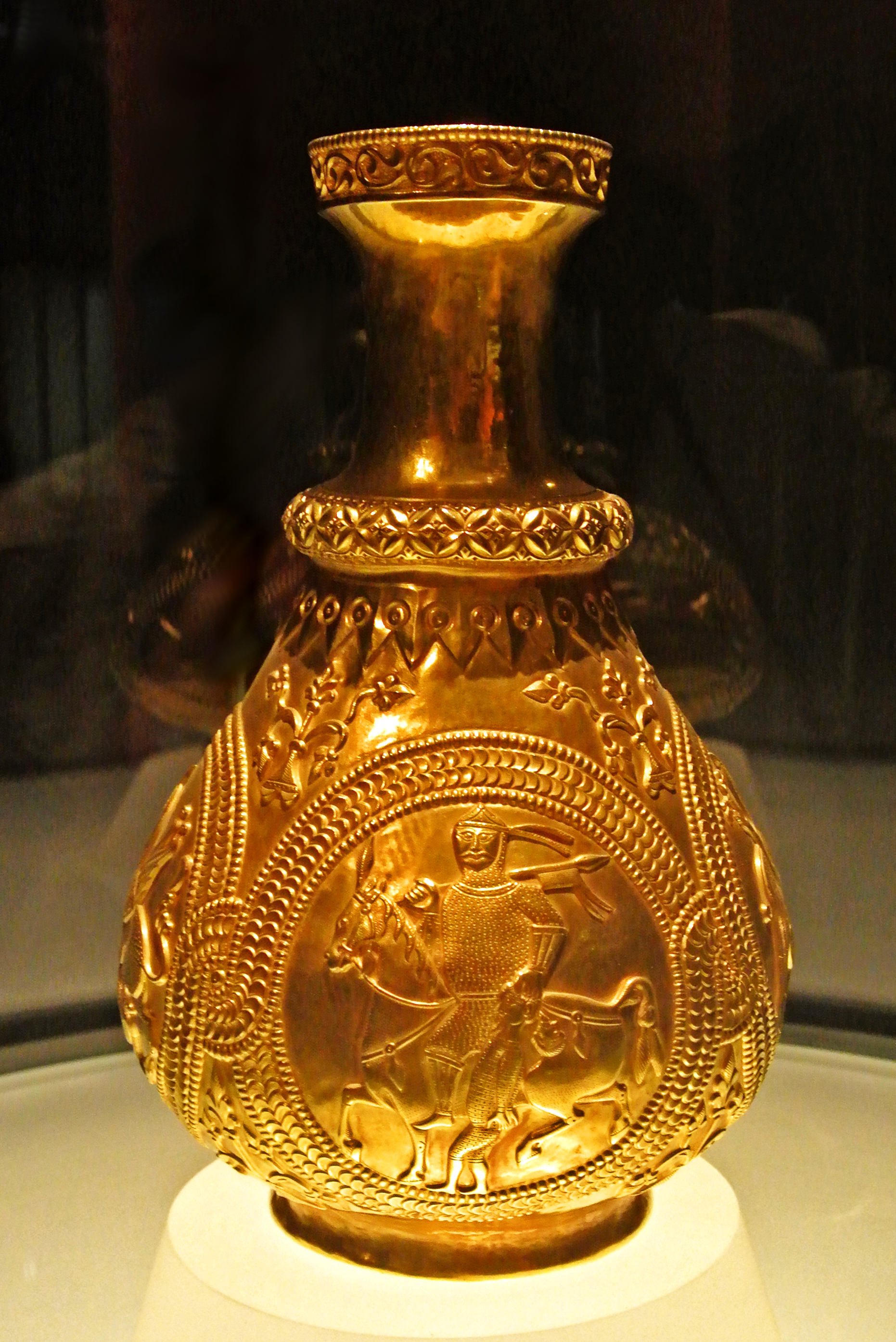
The jug golden medallion, from the Treasure of Nagyszentmiklós, depicts a warrior with his captive. Experts cannot agree if this warrior represents a Khazar, Pannonian Avar, or Bulgar.

Due to the lack of definitive evidence, modern scholarship uses an ethnogenesis approach in explaining the Bulgars origin. More recent theories view the nomadic confederacies, such as the Bulgars, as the formation of several different cultural, political and linguistic entities that could dissolve as quickly as they formed, entailing a process of ethnogenesis.

According to Walter Pohl, the existential fate of the tribes and their confederations depended on their ability to adapt to an environment going through rapid changes, and to give this adaptation a credible meaning rooted in tradition and ritual. Slavs and Bulgars succeeded because their form of organization proved as stable and as flexible as necessary, while the Pannonian Avars failed in the end because their model could not respond to new conditions. Pohl wrote that members of society's lower strata did not feel themselves to be part of any large-scale ethnic group; the only distinct classes were within the armies and the ruling elite.

Recent studies consider ethnonyms closely related with warrior elites who ruled over a variety of heterogeneous groups. The groups adopted new ideology and name as political designation, while the elites claimed right to rule and royal descent through origin myths.

When the Turkic tribes began to enter into the Pontic–Caspian steppe in the Post-Hunnic era, or as early as the 2nd century AD, their confederations incorporated an array of ethnic groups of newly joined Turkic, Caucasian, Iranian, and Finno-Ugric peoples. During their Western Eurasian migrations to the Balkans, they also came into contact with Armenian, Semitic, Slavic, Thracian and Anatolian Greek among other populations.

From the 6th to 8th centuries, distinctive Bulgar monuments of the Sivashovka type were built upon ruins of the late Sarmatian culture of the 2nd to 4th centuries AD, and the 6th century Penkovka culture of the Antes and Slavs. Early medieval Saltovo-Mayaki (an Alanic-based culture) settlements in the Crimea since the 8th century were destroyed by the Pechengs during the 10th century.

Although the older Iranian tribes were enveloped by the widespread Turkic migration into the Pontic–Caspian steppe, the following centuries saw a complete disappearance of both the Iranic and Turkic languages, indicating dominance of the Slavic language among the common people.

== Anthropology and genetics ==
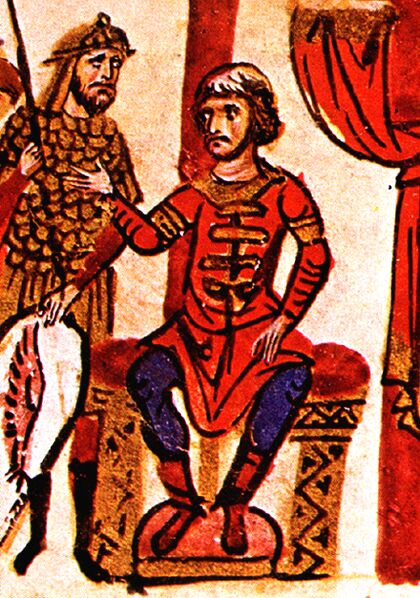
Khan Omurtag was the first Bulgar ruler known to have claimed divine origin, Madrid Skylitzes

According to a paleo-DNA study from 2019 which examined Medieval burials in the Carpathian Basin a closest connection was found between the Y-DNA of these nomadic people and the modern Volga Tatars. According to Hungarian archeogenetist Neparáczki Endre: "From all recent and archaic populations tested the Volga Tatars show the smallest genetic distance to the entire Conqueror population" and "a direct genetic relation of the Conquerors to Onogur-Bulgar ancestors of these groups is very feasible."

The paleoanthropological material from all sites in Volga region, Ukraine and Moldova attributed to the Bulgars testify complex ethno-cultural processes. The material shows the assimilation between the local population and the migrating newcomers. In all sites can be traced the anthropological type found in the Zlivka necropolis near the village of Ilichevki, the district of Donetsk, of brachiocranic Caucasoid with small East Asian admixtures but with Bulgar males being more Mongoloid than females.

Modern genetic research on Central Asian Turkic peoples and ethnic groups related to the Bulgars points to an affiliation with Western Eurasian populations. Despite the morphological proximity, there is a visible impact of the local population, in the Volga region of Volga Finns and Cuman-Kipchaks, in Ukraine of Onogur-Khazars and Sarmatian-Alans, and in Moldova and Thrace of Seven Slavic tribes. The comparative analysis showed large morphological proximity between the medieval and modern population of the Volga region. The examined graves in Northern Bulgaria and Southern Romania showed different somatic types, including Caucasoid-Mediterranean and less often East Asian.

The pre-Christian burial customs in Bulgaria indicate diverse social, i.e. nomadic and sedentary, and cultural influences. In some necropolises specific to the Danube Bulgars, artificial deformation was found in 80% of the skulls. The Bulgars had a special type of shamanic "medicine-men" who performed trepanations of the skull, usually near the sagittal suture. This practice had a medical application, as well as a symbolic purpose; in two cases the patient had brain problems. According to Maenchen-Helfen and Rashev, the artificial deformation of skulls, and other types of burial artifacts in Bulgars graves, are similar to those of the Sarmatians, and Sarmatized Turks or Turkicized Sarmatians of the post-Hunnic graves in the Ukrainian steppe.

== Legacy ==
In modern ethnic nationalism there is some "rivalry for the Bulgar legacy" (see Bulgarism). The Volga Tatars, Bashkirs and Chuvash people, are said to be descended from the Volga Bulgars, and there may have been ethnogenetic influences on the Hungarians (Magyars) and Karachay-Balkars also.

The President of the Bulgar National Congress, Gusman Khalilov appealed to the European Court of Human Rights on the issue of renaming the Tatars into Bulgars, but in 2010 he lost in court.

== See also ==
- Bulgar calendar
- Bulgar language
- Eurasian nomads
- History of Bulgaria
- Oghur languages
- Turkic migration
- Turkic tribal confederations

== General and cited sources ==
- Clauson, Gerard (1972). An Etymological dictionary of Pre-13th Century Turkish.
- Runciman, Steven (1930). "§ Appendix V – Bulgar titles". A history of the First Bulgarian Empire. London: George Bell & Sons.
- Maenchen-Helfen, Otto John (1973), The World of the Huns: Studies in Their History and Culture, University of California Press, ISBN 978-0-520-01596-8
- Tokarev, Sergei A. (1980). Mify narodov mira [Myths of the world's peoples] (in Russian). Vol. 2. Moscow: Sovetskaya Entsiklopediya.
- Shnirelʹman, Viktor A. (1987). "The Rivalry for the Bulgar legacy". Who Gets the Past?: Competition for Ancestors Among Non-Russian Intellectuals in Russia. Woodrow Wilson Center Press. ISBN 978-0-8018-5221-3.
- Fine, John V. Antwerp (1991). The Early Medieval Balkans: A Critical Survey from the Sixth to the Late Twelfth Century. University of Michigan Press. ISBN 978-0-472-08149-3.
- Golden, Peter Benjamin (1992). An introduction to the History of the Turkic peoples: ethnogenesis and state formation in medieval and early modern Eurasia and the Middle East. Wiesbaden: Otto Harrassowitz. ISBN 978-3-447-03274-2.
- Olson, James S.; Pappas, Lee Brigance; Pappas, Nicholas Charles (1994). An Ethnohistorical Dictionary of the Russian and Soviet Empires. Greenwood Publishing Group. ISBN 978-0-313-27497-8.
- Bowersock, Glen; Brown, Peter; Grabar, Oleg (1999). Late Antiquity: A Guide to the Postclassical World. Harvard University Press. ISBN 978-0-674-51173-6.
- Croke, Brian (2001). Count Marcellinus and His Chronicle. Oxford University Press. ISBN 978-0-19-815001-5.
- Karatay, Osman (2003). In Search of the Lost Tribe: The Origins and Making of the Croatian Nation. Ayse Demiral. ISBN 978-975-6467-07-7.
- Vásáry, István (2005). Cumans and Tatars: Oriental Military in the Pre-Ottoman Balkans, 1185–1365. Cambridge University Press. ISBN 978-1-139-44408-8.
- Curta, Florin (2006). Southeastern Europe in the Middle Ages, 500–1250. Cambridge University Press. ISBN 978-0-521-81539-0.
- Waldman, Carl; Mason, Catherine (2006). Encyclopedia of European Peoples. Infobase Publishing. ISBN 978-1-4381-2918-1.
- Brook, Kevin Alan (2006). The Jews of Khazaria. Rowman & Littlefield Publishers. ISBN 1-4422-0302-1.
- Petkov, Kiril (2008). The Voices of Medieval Bulgaria, Seventh-Fifteenth Century: The Records of a Bygone Culture. Brill. ISBN 978-90-04-16831-2.
- Fiedler, Uwe (2008). "Bulgars in the Lower Danube region: A survey of the archaeological evidence and of the state of current research". In Curta, Florin; Kovalev, Roman (eds.). The Other Europe in the Middle Ages: Avars, Bulgars, Khazars and Cumans. Brill. pp. 151–236. ISBN 978-90-04-16389-8.
- Sophoulis, Panos (2011). Byzantium and Bulgaria, 775–831. Brill. ISBN 978-90-04-20696-0. Archived from the original on 18 May 2015.
- Sedlar, Jean W. (2011). East Central Europe in the Middle Ages, 1000–1500. University of Washington Press. ISBN 978-0-295-80064-6.
- Golden, Peter B. (2011). Studies on the Peoples and Cultures of the Eurasian Steppes. Editura Academiei Române; Editura Istros a Muzeului Brăilei. ISBN 978-973-27-2152-0.
- Chen, Sanping (2012). Multicultural China in the Early Middle Ages. University of Pennsylvania Press. ISBN 978-0-8122-0628-9.
- Golden, Peter B. (2012), Oq and Oğur~Oğuz* (PDF), Turkish and Middle Eastern Studies, Rutgers University, archived from the original (PDF) on 19 April 2015
- Curta, Florin (2015). "Avar Blitzkrieg, Slavic and Bulgar raiders, and Roman special ops: mobile warriors in the 6th-century Balkans". In Zimonyi István; Osman Karatay (eds.). Eurasia in the Middle Ages. Studies in Honour of Peter B. Golden. Wiesbaden: Otto Harrassowitz. pp. 69–89.
- Lalueza-Fox, C.; Sampietro, M. L.; Gilbert, M. T. P.; Castri, L.; Facchini, F.; Pettener, D.; Bertranpetit, J. (2004). "Unravelling migrations in the steppe: Mitochondrial DNA sequences from ancient Central Asians". Proceedings of the Royal Society B: Biological Sciences. 271 (1542): 941–647. doi:10.1098/rspb.2004.2698. PMC 1691686. PMID 15255049.
- Karachanak, S.; Grugni, V.; Fornarino, S.; Nesheva, D.; Al-Zahery, N.; Battaglia, V.; Carrosa, C.; Yordanov, Y.; Torroni, A.; Galabov, A.; Toncheva, D.; Semino, O. (2015). "Y-Chromosome Diversity in Modern Bulgarians: New Clues about Their Ancestry". PLOS ONE. 8 (3) e56779. Bibcode:2013PLoSO...856779K. doi:10.1371/journal.pone.0056779. PMC 3590186. PMID 23483890.
- Zimonyi, István (1990). Klára Szõnyi-Sándor (ed.). The Origins of the Volga Bulghars. Studia Uralo-Altaica, 32.
- Ostrogorsky, George (1968). History of the Byzantine State. Oxford: Oxford: Basil Blackwell. ISBN 9780631110705.
