= 454 =

454 in various calendars
- Gregorian calendar: 454; CDLIV
- Ab urbe condita: 1207
- Assyrian calendar: 5204
- Balinese saka calendar: 375–376
- Bengali calendar: −140 – −139
- Berber calendar: 1404
- Buddhist calendar: 998
- Burmese calendar: −184
- Byzantine calendar: 5962–5963
- Chinese calendar: 癸巳年 (Water Snake); 3151 or 2944 — to — 甲午年 (Wood Horse); 3152 or 2945
- Coptic calendar: 170–171
- Discordian calendar: 1620
- Ethiopian calendar: 446–447
- Hebrew calendar: 4214–4215
- Hindu calendars
- Vikram Samvat: 510–511
- Shaka Samvat: 375–376
- Kali Yuga: 3554–3555
- Holocene calendar: 10454
- Iranian calendar: 168 BP – 167 BP
- Islamic calendar: 173 BH – 172 BH
- Javanese calendar: 339–340
- Julian calendar: 454; CDLIV
- Korean calendar: 2787
- Minguo calendar: 1458 before ROC 民前1458年
- Nanakshahi calendar: −1014
- Seleucid era: 765/766 AG
- Thai solar calendar: 996–997
- Tibetan calendar: ཆུ་མོ་སྦྲུལ་ལོ་ (female Water-Snake); 580 or 199 or −573 — to — ཤིང་ཕོ་རྟ་ལོ་ (male Wood-Horse); 581 or 200 or −572

Year 454 (CDLIV) was a common year starting on Friday of the Julian calendar. At the time, it was known as the Year of the Consulship of Aetius and Studius (or, less frequently, year 1207 Ab urbe condita). The denomination 454 for this year has been used since the early medieval period, when the Anno Domini calendar era became the prevalent method in Europe for naming years.

== Events ==
=== By place ===
==== Roman Empire ====
- September 21 – Emperor Valentinian III stabs his commander-in-chief Flavius Aetius to death, during a meeting of the imperial council at Ravenna. He has accused Aetius of plotting against him to seize power. After his assassination, the Western Roman Empire has no effective defender against its hostile barbarian neighbors (Alans, Franks, Ostrogoths, Vandals and Visigoths).

==== Europe ====
- Battle of Nedao: Allied forces of subjected peoples (Gepids, Heruli, Ostrogoths, Rugii, Sciri and Suebi), under the leadership of King Ardaric, defeat the Huns under Ellac, eldest son of Attila the Hun, in Pannonia. Ellac is killed during the battle and succeeded by his brother Dengizich.
- Ardaric unites the Gepids with other Germanic tribes, and founds the Kingdom of the Gepids in the Pannonian Basin.
- The Vandals conquer Malta.
- Ireland: The Diocese of Clogher is erected.

== Births ==
- Theodoric the Great, king of the Ostrogoths (d. 526)
- Xian Wen Di, Chinese emperor of Northern Wei (d. 476)

== Deaths ==
- September 21 – Flavius Aetius, Roman general (magister militum)
- Ellac, king of the Huns
- Justa Grata Honoria, sister of Valentinian III (approximate date)
- Dioscorus the Great, patriarch of Alexandria
