= Maenchen =

Maenchen is a surname. Notable persons with the surname include:

- John Eric Maenchen, American engineer
- Otto J. Maenchen-Helfen (1894–1969), Austrian academic
