= Ernak =

Third son of Attila and last known ruler of the Huns

Ernak was the last known ruler of the Huns, and the third son of Attila. After Attila's death in AD 453, his Empire crumbled and its remains were ruled by his three sons, Ellac, Dengizich and Ernak. He succeeded his older brother Ellac in AD 454, and probably ruled simultaneously over Huns in dual kingship with his brother Dengizich, but in separate divisions in separate lands.

Priscus, during his stay at Attila's court in AD 448 or 449, recorded a personal occasion between Attila and Ernak. At a banquet Attila looked on him with serene eyes, while taking small account of his other sons. He was Attila's favorite son, because as a certain Hun explained to him, the Hunnic prophets prophesied his genos would fail, but would be restored by this son.

Ernak has often been identified with Irnik from the Nominalia of the Bulgarian khans, who is noted as a descendant of the Dulo clan and leader of the Bulgars for 150 years, starting approximately from AD 437.

== Etymology ==
The name is recorded in two, possibly three variants, Ήρνάχ (Ernakh) by Priscus, and Hernac by Jordanes in Getica, and possibly Ирникъ (Irnik) in Nominalia of the Bulgarian khans. Otto J. Maenchen-Helfen discounted this last connection, arguing that the name is just as similar to the Armenian Arnak, a figure living at the same time as Ernak, as it is to Irnik. Nicholas Poppe argued that the name originally had h- in initial position (er < här, her).

Omeljan Pritsak derived the name from Turkic erän, irregular plural of ēr, meaning "man, real man, hero". He argued that the ending -nik was a diminutive suffix, -näk or -nik, found only in the Altai dialects, sometime also used as an augmentation. The name, reconstructed by Pritsak as Hērnäk, could thus mean both "hero" and "little [lucky] man".

Maenchen-Helfen, while aware of Pritsak's theory, considered the name to be of unknown origin.

== History ==
The oldest brother Ellac died in AD 454, at the Battle of Nedao. Jordanes recorded 'When Ellac was slain, his remaining brothers were put to flight near the shore of the Sea of Pontus where we have said the Goths settled ... dwelling again in their ancient abodes". Jordanes recounts c. 454-455:

"[After the Ostrogoths led by their king Valamir, and his brothers Theodemir and Vidimir received Pannonia] Now it happened that the sons of Attila, regarding the Goths as deserters from their rule, came against them as though they were seeking fugitive slaves and attacked Valamir alone, when his brothers knew nothing of it. He sustained their attack, though he had but few with him, and after harassing them a long time, so utterly overwhelmed them that scarcely a portion of the enemy remained. The remnant turned in flight and sought the parts of Scythia which border on the stream of the river Danaber, which the Huns call in their own tongue Var. Whereupon he sent a messenger of good tidings to his brother Theodemir ... on the very day the messenger arrived ... Theoderic was born [in 454]".

"Hernac, the younger son of Attila, with his followers, chose a home in the most distant part of Scythia Minor. Emnetzur and Ultzindur kinsmen of his, seized by force Oescus and Vtus and Almus in Dacia on the bank of the Danube, and many of the Huns, then swarming everywhere, betook themselves into Romania; descendants of them are to this day called Sacromontisi and Fossatisii".

The toponyms Vtus (at the mouth of river Utus, today Vit), Oescus, near present Gigen at the mouth of river Iskar, and Almus, the present Lom, were situated in Dacia Ripensis. The Sacromontisi may have received their name from the holy mountain in Thrace, while the Fossatisii (fossatum, military camp) linguistically points to Moesia. Jordanes makes distinction between the Huns who seized land, and Alanic and Germanic tribes who received it.

In early 458, Western Roman Emperor Majorian gathered a vast army formed by barbarian tribes, including Chunus, for the campaign against the Vandals. Sidonius Apollinaris recounts that "around thee thronged thousands under diverse standards. Only one race denied thee obedience, a race who had lately, in a mood even more savage than their wont, withdrawn their untamed host from the Danube because they had lost their lords in warfare, and Tuldila stirred in that unruly multitude a mad lust for fight which they must needs pay dear". This account refers to the loss of Ellac and other chieftains, the Battle of Nedao was fought only few years before, and they withdrawn from the Danube, now occupied by former Germanic subjects. Those Huns were situated in Moesia Superior and Dacia Ripensis.

Priscus recorded that in 465-466, Dengizich and Ernak sent diplomats to Constantinople. They wanted a peace treaty, and a market place on Danube "according to the ancient customs" between Romans and Huns, but were rejected. While Dengizich died in 469, it is considered that Ernak managed to maintain peaceful relations with the Romans living in the Dobruja region. It seems he was content, compared to Dengizich, with the limited land he was given. The fate of Ernak is unclear.

== Legacy ==
Irnik, a village in Bulgaria is named after Irnik (Ernak).

Irnik Point on Snow Island in the South Shetland Islands, Antarctica is named after Irnik (Ernak).

== Sources ==
- Maenchen-Helfen, Otto J. (1973). The World of the Huns: Studies in Their History and Culture. University of California Press. ISBN 9780520015968.
- Pritsak, Omeljan (1982). "The Hunnic Language of the Attila Clan" (PDF). Harvard Ukrainian Studies. IV (4). Cambridge, Massachusetts: Harvard Ukrainian Research Institute. ISSN 0363-5570. Archived from the original (PDF) on 2016-12-13.
- Golden, Peter Benjamin (1992). An introduction to the History of the Turkic peoples: ethnogenesis and state formation in medieval and early modern Eurasia and the Middle East. Wiesbaden: Otto Harrassowitz. ISBN 9783447032742.
- Heather, Peter (2007). The Fall of the Roman Empire: A New History of Rome and the Barbarians. Oxford University Press. ISBN 9780195325416.
- Heather, Peter (2010). Empires and Barbarians: The Fall of Rome and the Birth of Europe. Oxford University Press. ISBN 9780199752720.
- Given, John P. (2015). The Fragmentary History of Priscus: Attila, the Huns and the Roman Empire, AD 430–476. Arx Publishing. ISBN 9781935228141.

Preceded by Dengizich	King of the Huns; 454 – after 469	Succeeded by None
