= Chelchal =

Hun lieutenant general

Chelchal (fl. 467) was a Hun commander serving as lieutenant general under the Byzantine Empire.

== History ==
He was the deputy commander of Aspar's forces. Once, during a "barbarian" (Hunnic, Gothic and Scythian) invasion of the Roman Empire, Chelchal and three other Roman generals (Basiliscus, Anagast and Ostryis) managed to defeat the "barbarians", pushing them into a valley. Hard pressed by starvation, they sent an embassy to the Romans to treat their surrender, stating that if they surrendered and were allotted lands, they would obey to the Romans.

The Roman generals said they would forward the request to the emperor, and meanwhile would give them food, provided they arrange in as many segments as those formed by Aspar and the Romans (in this way, Chelchal and the other generals could "better care for them"). Chelchal then summoned the (Goth) logades to communicate them that the land the emperor would give them would be given to the Huns among them, not the Goths. Though Chelchal was an ethnic Hun and he was proud of his origins, he informed the Goths out of a sense of justice, so that they may know of the injustice dealt on them and act accordingly. What Chelchal told them caused indeed a clash between Huns and Goths. Apparently, the revolt of the Goths caused Dengizich (who was leading the invasion of the Roman Empire) to retreat.

As soon as Aspar heard about the ongoing fight between the two people, he and the other commanders summoned their troops and started to kill all the "barbarians" they met. The Scythians "perceived the treachery", gathered together, and turned against the Romans, but Aspar and his commanders anticipated them, killing the Scythian troops allotted to them to the last man. The fight was difficult for Chelchal and the other generals, as the "barbarians" are said to have fought bravely, with some of them eventually managing to escape through the Romans' blockade.

Ostyrs and Chelchal probably purposefully stirred up the revolt, possibly following Aspar's indications, but without informing the other generals, note even Basiliscus, who was the overall commander. This caused the Goths to be more successful against the Romans in this case.

== Etymology ==
His name recalls that of another Hun, Chalazar. It might be of Turkic origin.
