= Tuldila =

Tuldila (458) was a Hun leader in Majorian's army.

== History ==
In early 458, Western Roman Emperor Majorian gathered a vast army formed by barbarian tribes, including Chunus, for the campaign against the Vandals. Sidonius Apollinaris recounts:

"...around thee thronged thousands under diverse standards. Only one race denied thee obedience, a race who had lately, in a mood even more savage than their wont, withdrawn their untamed host from the Danube because they had lost their lords in warfare, and Tuldila stirred in that unruly multitude a mad lust for fight which they must needs pay dear".

This account refers to the loss of Ellac and other chieftains, the Battle of Nedao was fought only few years before, and they withdrawn from the Danube, now occupied by former Germanic subjects. Those Huns were situated in Moesia Superior and Dacia Ripensis.

== Etymology ==
Tuldila's, like the name of Tulan Qaghan (Τουλδίχ; 580s) of the Göktürks, derives from Turkic *tuld (composed of uld or ult, see Uldin), and diminutive suffix in/ach (+q, +k) ie. Germanic diminutive suffix -ila.
