= Battle of Bassianae =

468 Ostrogothic victory over the Huns

Date	468
Location	Bassianae, modern Serbia
Result	Ostrogothic victory; Fall of the Hunnic Empire

Belligerents
Ostrogoths	Huns

Commanders and leaders
Valamir	Dengizich

The Battle of Bassianae took place between the Ostrogoths and the Huns in 468. Recovering from the defeat at Nedao in 454, the Hunnic leader Dengizich launched an invasion across the Danube with a large Hun force, but was defeated by the Ostrogothic king Valamir. Jordanes writes that in turn the Huns "for ever after" left the Goths in peace.
