= 454 (disambiguation) =

AD 454 was a year of the Julian calendar.

454 may also refer to:

- 454 BC, a year of the pre-Julian Roman calendar
- 454 Life Sciences, an American biotech company
- .454 Casull, a handgun cartridge
- 454, a model of the Chevrolet big-block engine
- 454 Mathesis, a main-belt asteroid
- 454 (rapper), American rapper and record producer (born 1996)

== See also ==
- 454th (disambiguation)
