= 454th =

454th may refer to:

- 454th Bombardment Wing, inactive United States Air Force unit
- 454th Flying Training Squadron, inactive United States Air Force unit

== See also ==
- 454 (number)
- 454 (disambiguation)
- 454, the year 454 (CDLIV) of the Julian calendar
- 454 BC
