= Akatziri =

Historical ethnical group

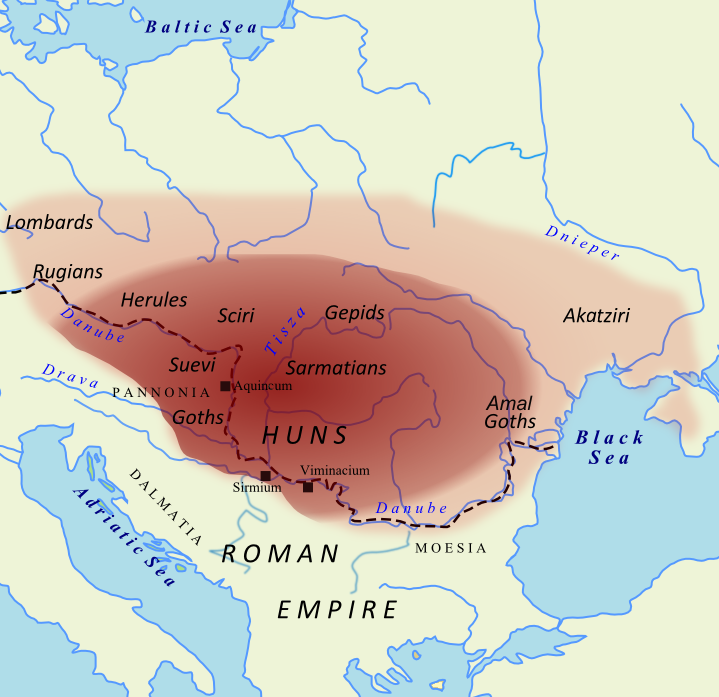

The Akatziri, Akatzirs or Acatiri (Ancient Greek: Άκατίροι, Άκατζίροι, Akatiroi, Akatziroi; Latin: Acatziri) were a tribe that lived north of the Black Sea, though the Crimean city of Cherson seems to have been under their control in the sixth century. Jordanes (fl. 551) called them a mighty people, not agriculturalists but cattle-breeders and hunters. Their ethnicity is undetermined: the 5th-century historian Priscus describes them as ethnic (ethnos) Scythians, but they are also referred to as Huns (Akatiri Hunni). Their name has also been connected to the Agathyrsi. However, according to E. A. Thompson, any conjectured connection between the Agathyrsi and the Akatziri should be rejected outright.

== History ==
Roman emperor Theodosius II (r. 402–450) sent an envoy to the Akatziri trying to detach them from their alliance with the Hunnic ruler Attila (435–453), an effort made to stir up fighting which also ensued. In 447 or 448 the Huns successfully campaigned against the Akatziri. In 448 or 449, as Priscus recounts "Onegesius along with the eldest of Attila's children, had been sent to the Akateri, a Scythian people, whom he was bringing into an alliance with Attila". As the Akatziri tribes and clans were ruled by different leaders, emperor Theodosius II tried with gifts to spread animosity among them, but the gifts were not delivered according to rank, Karadach (Kouridachos) warned and called Attila against fellow leaders. So Attila did, Kardach stayed with his tribe or clan in own territory, while the rest of the Akatziri became subjected to Attila. Attila's son Ellac was installed as ruler of the Akatziri. According to Sinor (1990), they were absorbed by the Saragurs in the 460s..

=== Akatziri rulers ===
- Karadach, reigned to 448

==== Attilid dynasty ====
- Ellac, r. 448–454
- Dengizich, r. 454–469 (Note: It isn't confirmed that Ellac's brothers ruled the Akatziri after Ellac's demise at the Battle of Nedao (454). Dengizich co-ruled the Hunnic empire with his younger brother Ernak until his demise in 469, while the latter, who outlived him, continued to rule parts of the empire thereafter, probably living in the Dobruja region. According to Sinor the Akatziri were absorbed by the Saragurs in the 460s.)
- Ernak, r. 454 – after 469

== Possible descendants ==
Akatziri were also hypothesized to be a Turkic tribe, their ethnonym connected to Turkic ağaç eri, 'woodman' or *Aq Qazir "White Khazars". However, Peter B. Golden remarks that: " Neither of these theses has been firmly grounded in anything beyond phonetic resemblance"; and the other hypothesis that Akatziri were ancestors of the Khazars is not backed up by any solid evidence. Omeljan Pritsak links Ak-Katzirs (< Άκατζίροι) to the name Khazar, though he explains that the polity was named Khazar simply because the Ashina-ruled Western Turks, after losing their territories to Tang Chinese, took over the territory formerly occupied by the Akatziri.

== Sources ==
- Blockley, R. C. (1992). East Roman Foreign Policy: Formation and Conduct from Diocletian to Anastasius. Cairns. ISBN 978-0-905205-83-0.
- Given, John P. (2015). The Fragmentary History of Priscus: Attila, the Huns and the Roman Empire, AD 430–476. Arx Publishing. ISBN 9781935228141.
- Henning, W. B. (1952). "A Farewell to the Khagan of the Aq-Aqatärān". Bulletin of the School of Oriental and African Studies. 14 (3): 501–522. doi:10.1017/S0041977X00088480. S2CID 163066705.
- Pritsak, Omeljan (September 1978). "The Khazar Kingdom's Conversion to Judaism" (PDF). Harvard Ukrainian Studies. II.3: 261–281.
- Sinor, Denis (1990). The Cambridge History of Early Inner Asia. Cambridge University Press. pp. 191–. ISBN 978-0-521-24304-9.
- Sinor, Denis (1997). Studies in Medieval Inner Asia. Ashgate. ISBN 978-0-86078-632-0.
- Golden, Peter B. (2011). Hriban, Cǎtǎlin (ed.). Studies on the Peoples and Cultures of the Eurasian Steppes.
- Thompson, E. A. (1948). A History of Attila and the Huns. Oxford: Clarendon Press. ISBN 978-0-837-17640-6. Atwood notes that Jordanes describes how the Crimean city of Cherson, "where the avaricious traders bring in the goods of Asia", was under the control of the Akatziri Huns in the sixth century. Ammianus, Marcellinus (1939), AMMIANUS MARCELLINUS ROMAN ANTIQUITIES - Book XXXI (Vol. III of the Loeb Classical Library edition)
- Atwood, Christopher P. (2012). "Huns and Xiōngnú: New Thoughts on an Old Problem". In Boeck, Brian J.; Martin, Russell E.; Rowland, Daniel (eds.). Dubitando: Studies in History and Culture in Honor of Donald Ostrowski. Cambridge University Press. pp. 27–52. ISBN 978-0-8-9357-404-8.
