= Karadach =

Chieftain of Akatiroi

Karadach or Kuridach (in Greek Κουριδαχος, Kouridachos, Latin: Curidachus) was an important chieftain of the Akatziri tribe of the Hunnic confederation during the reign of Attila. According to Priscus he rose to prominence when he was courted by Roman diplomats in 448 AD as a potential ally against the Huns, but used the information to help his overlord foil a revolt among lesser chiefs of the Akatziri; thus Attila left his lands untouched while the remaining were taken.

== Etymology ==
Otto J. Maenchen-Helfen considers the name to be "possibly" Turkic. He suggests an etymology of *Kurtaq: kurt (wolf) plus the diminutive suffix -q.

== Books ==
- Martindale, John R., ed. (1980). The Prosopography of the Later Roman Empire: Volume II, AD 395–527. Cambridge: Cambridge University Press. pp. 330–331. ISBN 0-521-20159-4.

Preceded by Unknown	King of the Akatziri (Senior in office) ?–448	Succeeded by Ellac
