= Ardaric =

King of the Gepids

Ardaric (Latin: Ardaricus; fl. c. 450 AD) was the king of the Gepids, a Germanic tribe closely related to the Goths.

== Etymology ==
The name Ardaricus is assumed to represent Germanic *Hardu-reiks; Schütte (1933) tentatively identified the Heiðrekr of Germanic legend with the historical Gepid king.

== Biography ==
He was "famed for his loyalty and wisdom," one of the most trusted adherents of Attila the Hun, who "prized him above all the other chieftains." Ardaric is first mentioned by Jordanes as Attila's most prized vassal at the Battle of the Catalaunian Plains (451):

"The renowned king of the Gepidae, Ardaric, was there also with a countless host, and because of his great loyalty to Attila, he shared his plans. For Attila, comparing them in his wisdom, prized him and Valamir, king of the Ostrogoths, above all the other chieftains." (Jordanes, Getica, trans. C. C. Mierow, 1915)

=== Battle of Nedao ===
After Attila's death in 453, Ardaric led the rebellion against Attila's sons and routed them in the Battle of Nedao, thus ending the Huns' dominance in Eastern Europe. Since Attila's death, his eldest son Ellak had risen to power. Supported by Attila's chief lieutenant, Onegesius, he wanted to assert the absolute control with which Attila had ruled, while Attila's other two sons, Dengizik and Ernak, claimed kingship over smaller subject tribes.

In 454, Ardaric led his Gepid and Ostrogothic forces against Attila's son Ellak and his Hunnish army. The Battle of Nedao was a bloody but decisive victory for Ardaric, in which Ellak was killed. Ardaric's most immediate achievement was the establishment of his people in Dacia. His defeat of the Huns at the River Nedao reduced the threat of invasion posed to the Eastern Roman Empire.

=== Death ===
Ardaric's year of death is unknown. The Gepid king Mundo (Mundonus), who ruled in the early 6th century, was probably his grandson.

== See also ==
- Valamir
- Theodoric I

== Sources ==
- Charnock, R.S. "The Peoples of Transylvania." Journal of the Anthropological Society of London 7 (1869).
- Horworth, H.H. "The Westerly Drifting of Nomads, from the Fifth to the Nineteenth Century. Part XII. The Huns." The Journal of the Anthropological Institute of Great Britain and Ireland 3 (1874): 452-75.
- Kim, Hyun Jin, The Huns, Rome and the Birth of Europe Cambridge University Press (2013).
- Makkai, Laszlo, and Andras Mocsy, eds. History of Transylvania Vol. 1: From the Beginnings to 1606. New York: Columbia UP, 2001.
- Mierow, Charles C., trans. Jordanes: The Origin and Deeds of the Goths. Texts for Ancient History Courses. 22 Apr. 1997. Department of Greek, Latin and Ancient History, University of Calgary. 26 November 2008 (acs.ucalgary.ca Archived 2006-04-24 at the Wayback Machine).
- Man, John. Attila : The Barbarian King Who Challenged Rome. New York: Thomas Dunne Books, 2006.
- Oliver, Marilyn Tower. Attila the Hun. New York: Blackbirch P, Incorporated, 2005.
- Wolfram, Herwig. The Roman Empire and Its Germanic Peoples. Trans. Thomas Dunlap. New York: University of California P, 1997.
