= Adamis =

Hun manager and steward

Adamis (fl. 448) was a Hun manager and steward. He was mentioned by Priscus in his 448/449 account of the Hunnish court.

== History ==
Adamis managed the affairs of Eracan (Kreka), the wife of Attila. He was the owner of a house in one of Attila's chief towns (where, according to Priscus, the Hunnish king had built one of his biggest abodes).

When Priscus visited the court of Attila, he also met Kreka, Attila's wife, who invited him and his embassy to dine at the house of her supervisor, Adamis, who had "charge of her affairs". Priscus accepted the invitation, and went to the house of Adamis. Here they greeted him with "gracious words and food". Priscus also reports that: "Each of those present, with Scythian generosity, arose and gave us each a full cup and then, after embracing and kissing the one who was drinking, received it back".

His name is hapax legomenon, meaning it appears only once in Priscus' account.
