= Ellac =

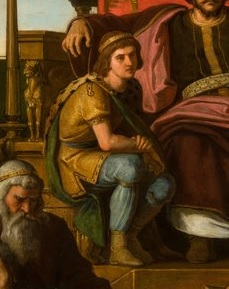
- Eldest son of Attila from Mór Than's The Feast of Attila (1870)

King of the Huns (co-rulership)
- Reign: 453–454
- Predecessor: Attila
- Successor: Dengizich and Ernak

Ruler of Pontic Scythia
- Reign: 448–454

King of the Akatziri
- Reign: 448–454
- Predecessor: Karadach
- Born: 5th century Pannonia
- Died: 454; Nedao, Pannonia
- Dynasty: Attilid
- Father: Attila
- Mother: Kreka

Ellac (died in 454 AD) was the oldest son of Attila (434–453) and Kreka. After Attila's death in 453 AD, his empire crumbled, and its remains were ruled by his three sons, Ellac, Dengizich and Ernak. He ruled briefly and died at the Battle of Nedao in 454 AD. Ellac was succeeded by his brothers, Dengizich and Ernak.

== Etymology ==
Several scholars derive Ellac from a word akin to Old Turkic älik / ilik / ilig ("prince, ruler, king), which derives from *el (realm) + lä-g (to rule, the rule). The name thus appears to be a title rather than a personal name.

== History ==
In 448 or 449 AD, as Priscus recounts "Onegesius along with the eldest of Attila's children, had been sent to the Akateri, a Scythian [Hunnic] people, whom he was bringing into an alliance with Attila". As the Akatziroi tribes and clans were ruled by different leaders, emperor Theodosius II tried with gifts to spread animosity among them, but the gifts were not delivered according to rank, Kouridachos, warned and called Attila against fellow leaders. So Attila did, Kardach stayed with his tribe or clan in their own territory, while the rest of the Akatziroi became subjected to Attila. Attila "desired to make his eldest son their king, and so sent Onegesios to do it". Onegesios returned with Ellac, who "had taken a spill and broken his right hand". Beside becoming king of the Akatziri, Ellac also governed "the other nations who dwell in Pontic Scythia".

Priscus also mentions the number of sons "Onegesios was seated on a chair to the right of the king's couch, and opposite Onegesios two [Dengizich and Ernak] of Attila's children were sitting on a chair. The eldest [Ellac] was seated on Attila's couch, not near him but at the edge, looking at the ground out of respect for his father".

After the rites of Attila's death in 453, according to Jordanes in Getica, the sons Ellac, Dengizich and Ernak (but possibly existed also other sons who pretended the throne):

"since young minds are usually excited by the chance to snatch power, the heirs of Attila began contesting the kingship. All desiring to rule autonomously, they all destroyed the empire simultaneously. Thus an abundance of heirs often burdens kingdoms more than a lack of them. Attila's sons ... demanded that the subject nations be divided among them by equal lot in order that, as with household property, warlike kings and their people might be distributed by lot".

A coalition of Germanic tribes, led by Ardaric, king of the Gepids, revolted against such slavery treatment, and "so they were armed for mutual destruction. War was waged in Pannonia, next to a river called Nedao. Various nations Attila had held in his sway came into combat there ... Goths, Gepids, Rugii, Suavi, Huns, Alans and Heruli". By "slavery" status is considered the pay of tributes and military service. There were many "grim clashes", but unexpected victory fell to the Gepids. Ardaric and his allies annihilated nearly 30,000 Huns and their allies. In the battle Attila's oldest son, Ellac, died. According to Priscus:

"[His] father was said to have loved so much beyond his other children that he placed him first among all the various children in the kingdom. His fortune, however, was not in harmony with his father's desire. For it is undisputed that, after slaughtering many enemies, he was killed so heroically that his father, if he had outlived him, would have wished to die so gloriously".

Jordanes recounts:

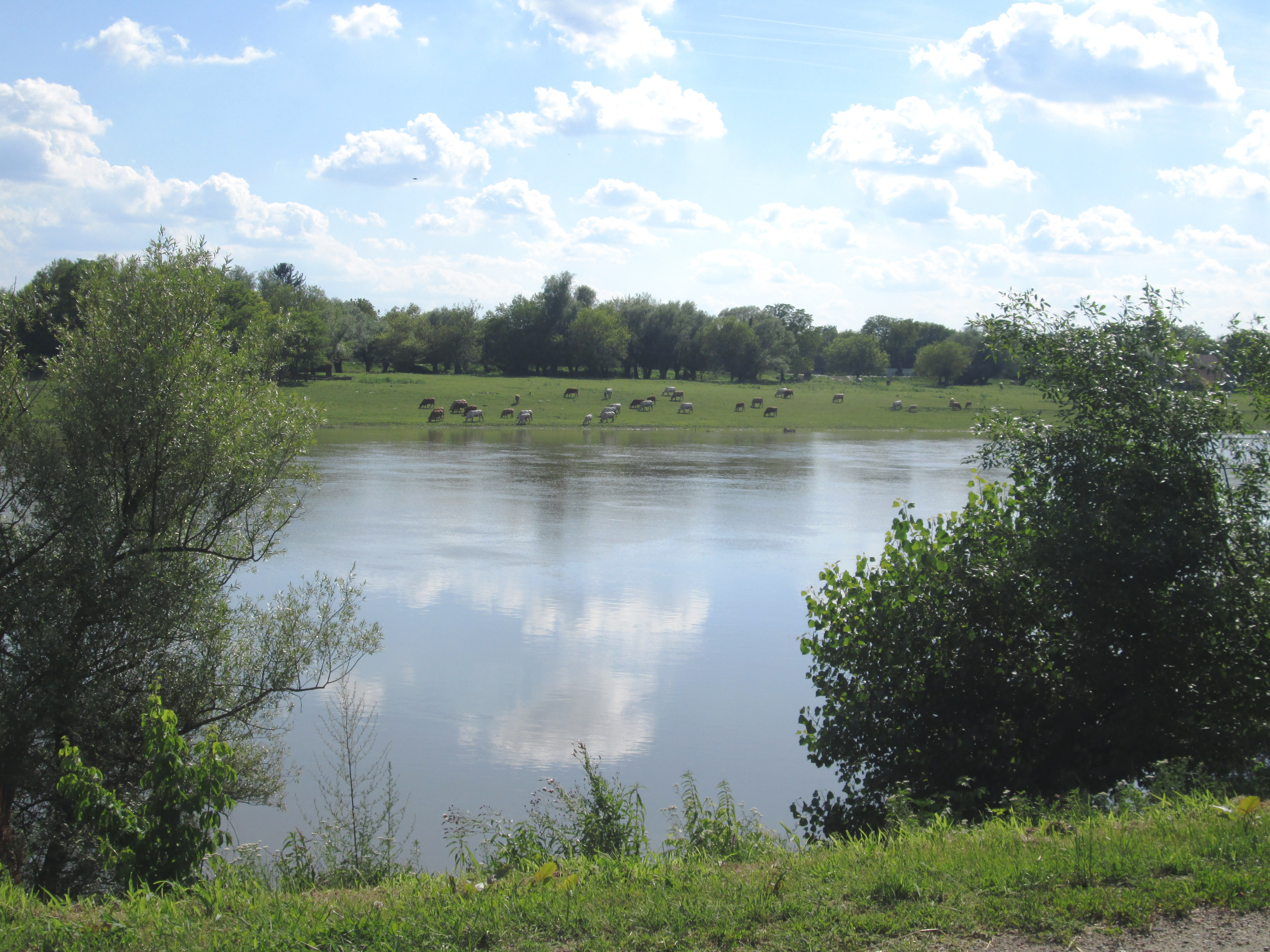
The Sava in Savia or one of its tributaries are thought to be the site of the Battle of Nedao

"When Ellac was slain, his remaining brothers were put to fight near the shore of the Sea of Pontus where we have said the Goths settled. And so yielded the Huns to whom the whole world was once thought to yield: their disintegration was so calamitous that a nation which, with their forces united, used to terrify, when divided, tumbled down ... Many nations, by sending embassies, came to Roman lands and were welcomed by the emperor Marcian ... Now when the Goths saw the Gepids defending for themselves the territory of the Huns, and the people of the Huns dwelling again in their ancient abodes, they preferred to ask for lands from the Roman Empire, rather than invade the lands of others with dangers to themselves. So they received Pannonia".

After the battle Attila's largely Germanic subject tribes started to reassert their independence. However, it was not sudden, and not all freed themselves. The Huns "turned in flight and sought the parts of Scythia which border on the stream of the river Danaber, which the Huns call in their own tongue Var". Hernak "chose a home in the most distant part of Scythia Minor". Not all Huns immediately left the Pannonian Basin, yet only Middle Danube. Some Huns remained in Dacia Ripensis i.e. Lower Danube, Moesia and Thrace.

== Sources ==
- Maenchen-Helfen, Otto J. (1973). The World of the Huns: Studies in Their History and Culture. University of California Press. ISBN 9780520015968.
- Pritsak, Omeljan (1982). "The Hunnic Language of the Attila Clan" (PDF). Harvard Ukrainian Studies. IV (4). Cambridge, Massachusetts: Harvard Ukrainian Research Institute. ISSN 0363-5570. Archived from the original (PDF) on 2016-12-13.
- Golden, Peter Benjamin (1992). An introduction to the History of the Turkic peoples: ethnogenesis and state formation in medieval and early modern Eurasia and the Middle East. Wiesbaden: Otto Harrassowitz. ISBN 9783447032742.
- Heather, Peter (2007). The Fall of the Roman Empire: A New History of Rome and the Barbarians. Oxford University Press. ISBN 9780195325416.
- Heather, Peter (2010). Empires and Barbarians: The Fall of Rome and the Birth of Europe. Oxford University Press. ISBN 9780199752720.
- Given, John P. (2015). The Fragmentary History of Priscus: Attila, the Huns and the Roman Empire, AD 430–476. Arx Publishing. ISBN 9781935228141.

Preceded by Attila	King of the Huns; 453–454	Succeeded by Dengizich
Preceded by None	Ruler of Pontic Scythia; 448–454	Succeeded by None
Preceded by Karadach	King of the Akatziri; 448–454	Succeeded by None
