= Anagast =

- Occupation: magister militum

Anagast or Anagastes (fl. 466–470) was a magister militum in the army of the Eastern Roman Empire. He was probably a Goth, as his name (as well as that of his father, Arnegisc(clus)) seems to be of Gothic origin. He was sent to negotiate with Dengizich, a son of Attila, when the western wing of the Huns invaded the empire with the intention to finally conquer its capital Constantinople and had already reached the Danube. However, Dengizich refused to negotiate with him and demanded to speak directly with the emperor Leo I. The western wing of the Huns was defeated and Dengizich was killed in 469.

The town of Nikšić, in Montenegro, formerly bore the name Anagastum. It is not known whether or not the name referred to the Anagast above.
