= John Eric Maenchen =

John Eric Maenchen is an electrical engineer with Sandia National Laboratories in Arlington, Virginia. He was named a Fellow of the Institute of Electrical and Electronics Engineers (IEEE) in 2012 for his work in the development of intense pulsed charged particle beams, and their application for flash radiography.
