= Battle of Nedao =

5th-century internal battle in the Hunnic Empire

- Part of Germanic-Hunnic Wars
- Topographic map of Carpathian Basin
Date	454
Location	Pannonia 44°56′00″N 19°01′00″E
Result	Germanic victory; End of the Huns rule in Eastern Europe

Belligerents
Gepids; Heruli; Rugii; Sciri; Suebi	Hunnic Empire; Alani

Commanders and leaders
Ardaric	Ellac †

The Battle of Nedao was fought in Pannonia in 454 between the Huns and their former vassals or allies. The Nedao is believed to be a tributary of the Sava.

== Battle ==
According to the 6th-century historian Jordanes:

And so the bravest nations tore themselves to pieces. For then, I think, must have occurred a most remarkable spectacle, where one might see the Goths fighting with pikes, the Gepidae raging with the sword, the Rugii breaking off the spears in their own wounds, the Suavi fighting on foot, the Huns with bows, the Alani drawing up a battle-line of heavy-armed and the Heruli of light-armed warriors ... after many grave clashes, victory surprisingly favours the Gepids for the sword and plotting of Ardaric killed nearly thirty thousand men, Huns as well as other tribes who brought them aid. In this battle, the eldest son of Attila, named Ellac, whom his father was said to have loved so much more than the rest that he favoured him above all his various sons in his empire, was killed.

== The battle in Hungarian chronicles ==
The description of the battle in medieval Hungarian chronicles follows:

They believed that after the father's death one of the sons would reign. But by the cunning of Dietrich and the other German princes, who had found Attila's rule stick in their throats, the undivided community of the Huns was split into diverse factions; some wished Attila to be succeeded as king by Csaba, his son by the daughter of Honorius, the emperor of the Greeks, while others favored Aladar, his son by the lady Krimhild, a princess of Germany. Both began to reign, the more prudent among the Huns holding to Csaba, while Aladar was supported by Dietrich, other peoples, and a few of the Huns. Each strove to gain the mastery, and by the astuteness of Dietrich, who was at that time in Sicambria as adherent of Aladar, battle was joined between them. It was so hard and fierce that for fifteen days the Danube ran with German blood, and if by reason of their hatred the Germans had not concealed the slaughter wrought in these days by the Huns, they would have had to confess that from Sicambria as far as Potenciana neither man nor brute beast could drink clear water from the Danube. That is the battle which the Huns call the battle of Krimhild up to this day. In the fighting Csaba and the Huns always held the upper hand. Yet by treachery Dietrich of Verona brought about their defeat. For at first Csaba pressed his brother hard, but in the end he was himself vanquished, and of his men there remained hardly fifteen thousand, the rest of the Huns and the sons of Attila being completely wiped out and killed. Thus after Attila's death the sons of Attila and the Huns killed each other in mutual slaughter.

— Mark of Kalt: Chronicon Pictum

== Modern views ==
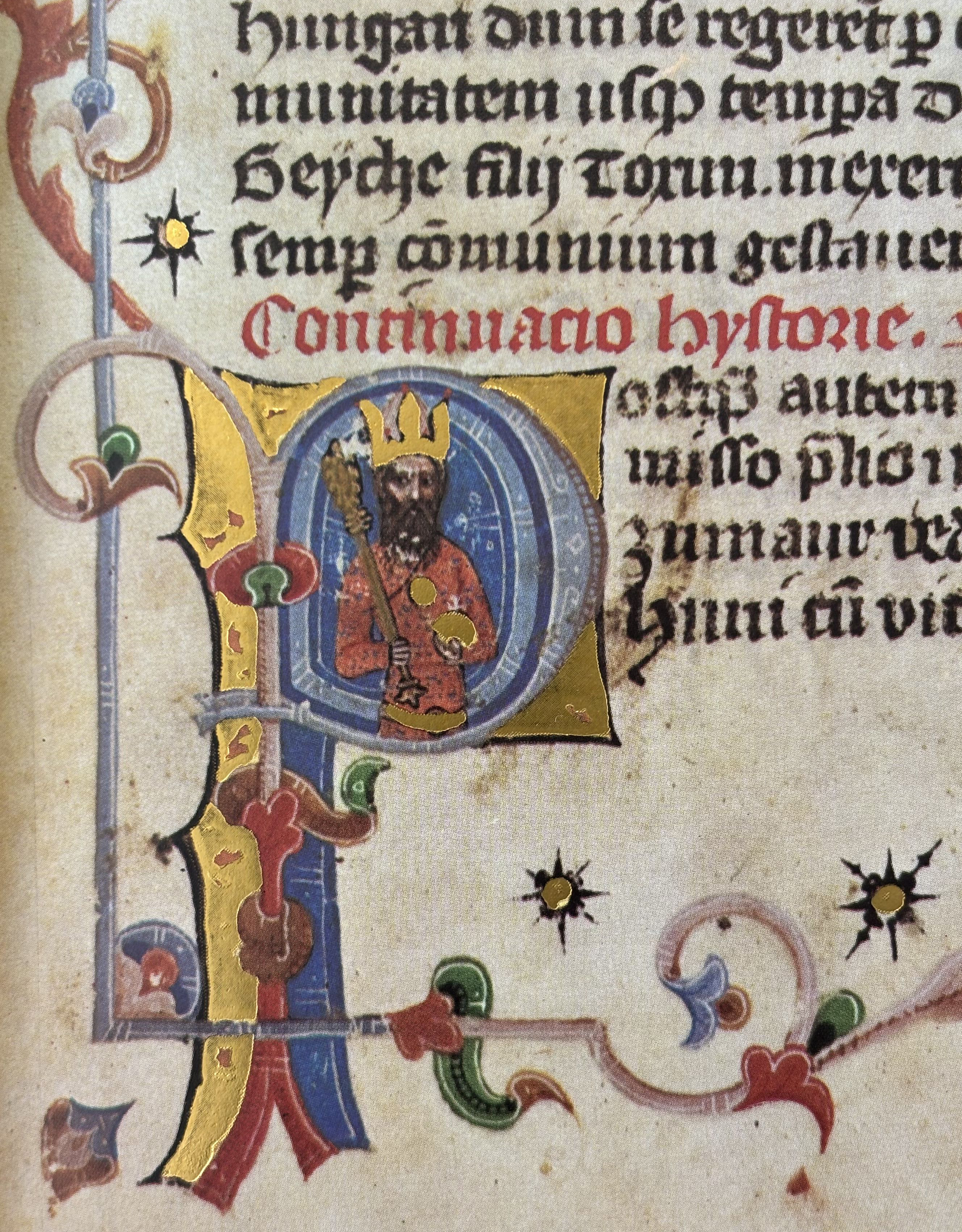
King Attila (Chronicon Pictum, 1358)

After the death of Attila, allied forces of the subject peoples under the leadership of Ardaric, king of the Gepids, defeated the Hunnic forces of Ellac, the son of Attila, who had struggled with his brothers Ernak and Dengizich for supremacy after Attila's death. Ellac himself was killed in the battle.

Jordanes claimed that at the Battle of Nedao the Ostrogoths fought against the Huns, but this is rejected by modern historians such as Herwig Wolfram and Hyun Jin Kim. The latter believes that this is a forged story and that the Ostrogoth king Valamir himself fought alongside the Huns. Alternatively, J. R. Martindale and Franz Altheim accept that the Ostrogoths were among the victors of Nedao, while many others, including Otto J. Maenchen-Helfen, believe that they did not participate at all.

== Aftermath ==
Hunnic dominance in Central and Eastern Europe was broken as a result of the battle. It is hard to reconstruct the exact course of events, but by the early 460s the Hunnic Empire dissolved, with the Gepids, Rugii, Heruli, Suebi, and Ostrogoths achieving independence and eventually becoming federates of the Eastern Roman Empire. The Huns, reorganized under Dengizich, moved to the east, where they attacked the Eastern Roman Empire and were decisively defeated in 469. After that point, the Huns cease to exist in European history.

== See also ==
- Hlöðskviða

== Sources ==
- Dıngıl Ilgın, Fatma Aysel (2019). "The Battle of Nedao and its Importance in Eastern European Turkish History". Journal of Old Turkic Studies. 3 (2): 310–320. doi:10.35236/jots.580636.
- Mingarelli, Bernardo (2018). Collapse of the Hunnic Empire: Jordanes, Ardaric and the Battle of Nedao (PDF) (MA thesis). University of Ottawa.
- Herwig Wolfram. History of the Goths, transl. Thomas J. Dunlap, University of California Press, 1990, ISBN 0-520-06983-8
