= Valamir =

Ostrogothic king (c. 420 – 469)

Valamir 𐍅𐌰𐌻𐌰𐌼𐌴𐍂𐍃

King of the Ostrogoths
- In office 447–469

Personal details
- Born: c. 420 Hunnic Empire
- Died: c. 469 (aged approx. 49) Near present day Hungary

Valamir or Valamer (c. 420 – c. 469) was an Ostrogothic king in the former Roman province of Pannonia from AD 447 until his death. During his reign, he fought alongside the Huns against the Roman Empire and then, after Attila the Hun's death, fought against the Huns to consolidate his independent control over a large group of Goths.

Valamir was the son of Vandalarius and cousin to king Thorismund. An important and trusted vassal of Attila the Hun, Valamir participated in Attila's raids of the provinces of the Danube (447), and commanded an Ostrogothic contingent of Attila's force at the Battle of Chalons. After Attila's death (453), Valamir, by force and diplomacy, became the leader of the large grouping of Goths who were settled by the Emperor Marcian in Pannonia. In the subsequent fight for independence from the Huns from 456 to 457, Valamir defeated the sons of Attila.

In 459 Valamir's Ostrogoths did not receive their accustomed annual tribute from the Romans and felt that Theoderic Strabo was getting more honour than they were. Valamir and his brothers therefore attacked Illyricum from 459 to 462, when the emperor Leo I agreed to pay the Goths 300 pounds of gold yearly. In 468, during a Hunnic attempt at reasserting control over the Ostrogoths by the King Dengizich, the Goths handed their old masters a decisive defeat at the Battle of Bassianae. Which in the words of the Roman historian Jordanes, the Huns for ever after left the Goths in peace. Valamir could not enjoy the victory for long however, as during a Scirian raid in 469, just before the Battle of Bolia, Valamir was ambushed, thrown from his horse and killed.

Jordanes in his Getica may have confused his name (Βαλαμέρ in the Greek alphabet), giving "Balamber" a fictitious existence as a king of the Huns about 375.

Preceded by	King of the Ostrogoths; 447–469	Succeeded by Theodemir
