= Dengizich =

Hunnic ruler and son of Atilla (died in 469 AD)

King of the Huns (co-rulership)
- Reign: 454–469
- Predecessor: Ellac
- Successor: Ernak
- Born: 5th century Pannonia
- Died: 469; Pannonia
- Dynasty: Attilid
- Father: Attila
- Mother: Kreka

Dengizich (died in 469), was a Hunnic ruler and son of Attila. After Attila's death in 453 AD, his empire crumbled and its remains were ruled by his three sons, Ellac, Dengizich and Ernak. Dengizich succeeded his older brother Ellac in AD 454, and probably ruled simultaneously over the Huns in dual kingship with his brother Ernak, but separate divisions in separate lands.

== Etymology ==
The name recorded as Δεγγιζίχ (De(n)gizikh) by Priscus has abbreviated variant Διν[γι]ζι (Din(gi)zi) in Chronicon Paschale, Den(git)zic by Marcellinus Comes, and Din(gi)tzic by Jordanes. Din(t)zic and Denzic render a Germanic pronunciation *Denitsik, with the frequent dropping of "g". Otto Maenchen-Helfen considered it a derivation from Turkic *Däŋiziq, meaning "little lake". Omeljan Pritsak considered the reconstructed form deŋir + čig > deŋičig, with the meaning "ocean-like".

== History ==
The oldest brother Ellac died in 454 AD, at the Battle of Nedao. Jordanes recorded "When Ellac was slain, his remaining brothers were put to fight near the shore of the Sea of Pontus where we have said the Goths settled ... dwelling again in their ancient abodes". Jordanes recounts events in c. 454-455:

"[After the Ostrogoths led by their king Valamir, and his brothers Theodemir and Vidimir received Pannonia] Now it happened that the sons of Attila, regarding the Goths as deserters from their rule, came against them as though they were seeking fugitive slaves and attacked Valamir alone, when his brothers knew nothing of it. He sustained their attack, though he had but few with him, and after harassing them a long time, so utterly overwhelmed them that scarcely a portion of the enemy remained. The remnant turned in flight and sought the parts of Scythia which border on the stream of the river Danaber, which the Huns call in their own tongue Var. Whereupon he sent a messenger of good tidings to his brother Theodemir ... on the very day the messenger arrived ... Theoderic was born [in 454]".

Priscus recorded that in 465-466, Dengizich and his brother Ernak sent diplomats to Constantinople. They wanted a peace treaty, and a market place on the Danube to carry out trade with the Romans, but the requests of Dengizich and Ernak were rejected by the Roman authorities.

Later Dengizich moved to the bank of the Istros (lower Danube) and threatened to break into Thrace unless he was granted lands and subsidies. He rejected negotiations with Anagast (who defended the Danube in Thrace), and sent diplomats directly to the emperor Leo I. However, Leo I replied that "he was ready to do everything if they came to him and offered him obedience. He took pleasure, he said, in nations which came seeking alliances".

In 467, Dengizich crossed the frozen Danube, and although he expected the Huns in the south to join him, large groups of undefined Goths and Scythians moved on their own. Probably after the turning Battle of Nedao, some groups of Goths still remained under Hun authority. Basiliscus, Goths Anagast and Ostryis, and Hun Chelchal were generals who led Roman armies. They managed to besiege the Goths into a valley, and the Scythians "oppresed by hunger and lack of necessities sent an embassy to the Romans that if they were to surrender and be allotted lands, they would obey the Romans in whatever they wanted". The report continues:

"The ambassadors reported the instructions to the Scythians, who arranged themselves into as many segments as Aspar and the Romans formed. Chelchal, a man of the Hunnic race and a subordinate of Aspar's commanders, went to the barbarian segment assigned to them. He summoned the leading men of the Goths (they were in the majority) and began saying that the emperor would give them land, not for their own use but for the Huns among them ... Perturbed by his words but believing that Chelchal had spoken benevolently, the Goths banded together and slew the Huns among them. A violent battle arose on both sides. Aspar and commanders of other camps drew up their troops and killed the barbarians they came upon. When the Scythians figured out the trickery and deceit, they called themselves together and turned against Romans. Aspar's men had destroyed the segment assigned to them... the barbarians fought so violently that their survivors cut through the Roman lines and in this way escaped the siege."

Anagast sent a large group of bucellari against the barbarians, but the war dragged on for two years.

Jordanes recounts events in c. 468:

"Now after firm peace was established between Goths and Romans, the Goths found that what they received from the emperor was not sufficient for them. Furthermore, they were eager to display their wonted valor, and so began to plunder the neighboring peoples around them, first attacking the Sadagis, who held the interior of Pannonia. When Dintzic, king of the Huns, a son of Attila, learned this, he gathered to him the few who still seemed to have remained under his sway, namely, the Ultzinzures, the Angisciri, the Bittugures and the Bardores. Coming to Bassianae (see Battle of Bassianae), a city of Pannonia, he beleaguered it and began to plunder its territory. When the Goths learned this, they abandoned the expedition they had planned against the Sadagis and turned upon the Huns and drove them so ingloriously from their own land that those who remained have been in dread of the arms of the Goths from that time down to the present day."

The war ended in 469. Marcellinus Comes shortly recorded "The head of Dinzic, son of Attila, king of the Huns, was brought to Constantinople". The Chronicon Paschale recounts "Dinzirichus, Attila's son, was killed by Anagastes, general in Thrace. His head was brought to Constantinople, carried in procession through the Middle Street, and fixed on a pole at the Wooden Circus. The whole city turned out to look at it".

== Sources ==
- Maenchen-Helfen, Otto J. (1973). The World of the Huns: Studies in Their History and Culture. University of California Press. ISBN 9780520015968.
- Pritsak, Omeljan (1982). "The Hunnic Language of the Attila Clan" (PDF). Harvard Ukrainian Studies. IV (4). Cambridge, Massachusetts: Harvard Ukrainian Research Institute. ISSN 0363-5570. Archived from the original (PDF) on 2016-12-13.
- Heather, Peter (2007). The Fall of the Roman Empire: A New History of Rome and the Barbarians. Oxford University Press. ISBN 9780195325416.
- Heather, Peter (2010). Empires and Barbarians: The Fall of Rome and the Birth of Europe. Oxford University Press. ISBN 9780199752720.
- Given, John P. (2015). The Fragmentary History of Priscus: Attila, the Huns and the Roman Empire, AD 430–476. Arx Publishing. ISBN 9781935228141.

Preceded by Ellac	King of the Huns; 454 – 469	Succeeded by Ernak
