= Otto J. Maenchen-Helfen =

Austrian Sinologist, historian, and traveler (1894–1969)

- Otto Mänchen-Helfen
- Born: July 26, 1894; Vienna, Austria-Hungary
- Died: January 29, 1969 (aged 74); Berkeley, California
- Scientific career
- Fields: Historiography; Sinology
- Institutions: University of California, Berkeley

Otto John Maenchen-Helfen (German: Otto Mänchen-Helfen; July 26, 1894 – January 29, 1969) was an Austrian academic, sinologist, historian, author, and traveler.

From 1927 to 1930, he worked at the Marx-Engels Institute in Moscow, and from 1930 to 1933 in Berlin. When the Nazi Party came to power in Germany, he returned to Austria, and after the Anschluss in 1938 he emigrated to the United States, eventually becoming a professor at the University of California, Berkeley. He was the author of several oft-cited books, including a history of the Huns.

He was the first non-Russian to travel and report on Tannu Tuva. He obtained permission to travel there and study its inhabitants in 1929. He later published his experiences in a book, Reise ins asiatische Tuwa (Travels in Asiatic Tuva).

== Selected list of works ==
- Mänchen-Helfen, Otto (1931). Reise ins asiatische Tuwa. Berlin: Der Bücherkreis. Translated into English in 1992 (see below).
- Mänchen-Helfen, Otto (1932). Rußland und der Sozialismus. Von der Arbeitermacht zum Staatskapitalismus. Berlin: Dietz.
- Nicolaevsky, Boris (author), and Maenchen-Helfen, Otto (translator) (1936). Karl Marx: Man and Fighter. (First published 1933 in German. Many English editions; some of them restore the notes, appendices, and bibliography omitted from the first English edition.)
- Maenchen-Helfen, Otto J. (1944-45a). ''Huns and Hsiung-Nu.'' Byzantion, vol. 17, pp. 222–243.
- Maenchen-Helfen, Otto J. (1944-45b). ''The Legend of the Origin of the Huns." Byzantion, vol. 17, pp. 244–251.
- Maenchen-Helfen, O. (1945). "The Yueh-chih Problem Re-examined." Journal of the American Oriental Society, vol. 65, p. 71–81.
- Maenchen-Helfen, O. (1951). "Manichaeans in Siberia." Semitic and Oriental Studies Presented to William Popper, ed. by Walter J. Fischel. University of California Publications in Semitic Philology, vol. 9. Berkeley: Univ. of California Press.
- Maenchen-Helfen, Otto J. (1973). The World of the Huns: Studies in Their History and Culture. Ed. by Max Knight. Berkeley and Los Angeles: Univ. of California Press. ISBN 0-520-01596-7. (Edited and enlarged in a 1978 German translation; see below.)
- Maenchen-Helfen, Otto J. (1978). Die Welt der Hunnen: Eine Analyse ihrer historischen Dimension. Vienna, Cologne, and Graz: Hermann Böhlaus Nachf.
- Mänchen-Helfen, Otto (1992). Journey to Tuva.; Trans. and annotated by Alan Leighton, with an introduction by Anna Maenchen. Ethnographics Press Monographs Series, edited by Gary Seaman, no. 5. Los Angeles: Univ. of Southern California Ethnographics Press. ISBN 1-878986-04-X.
