= List of Huns =

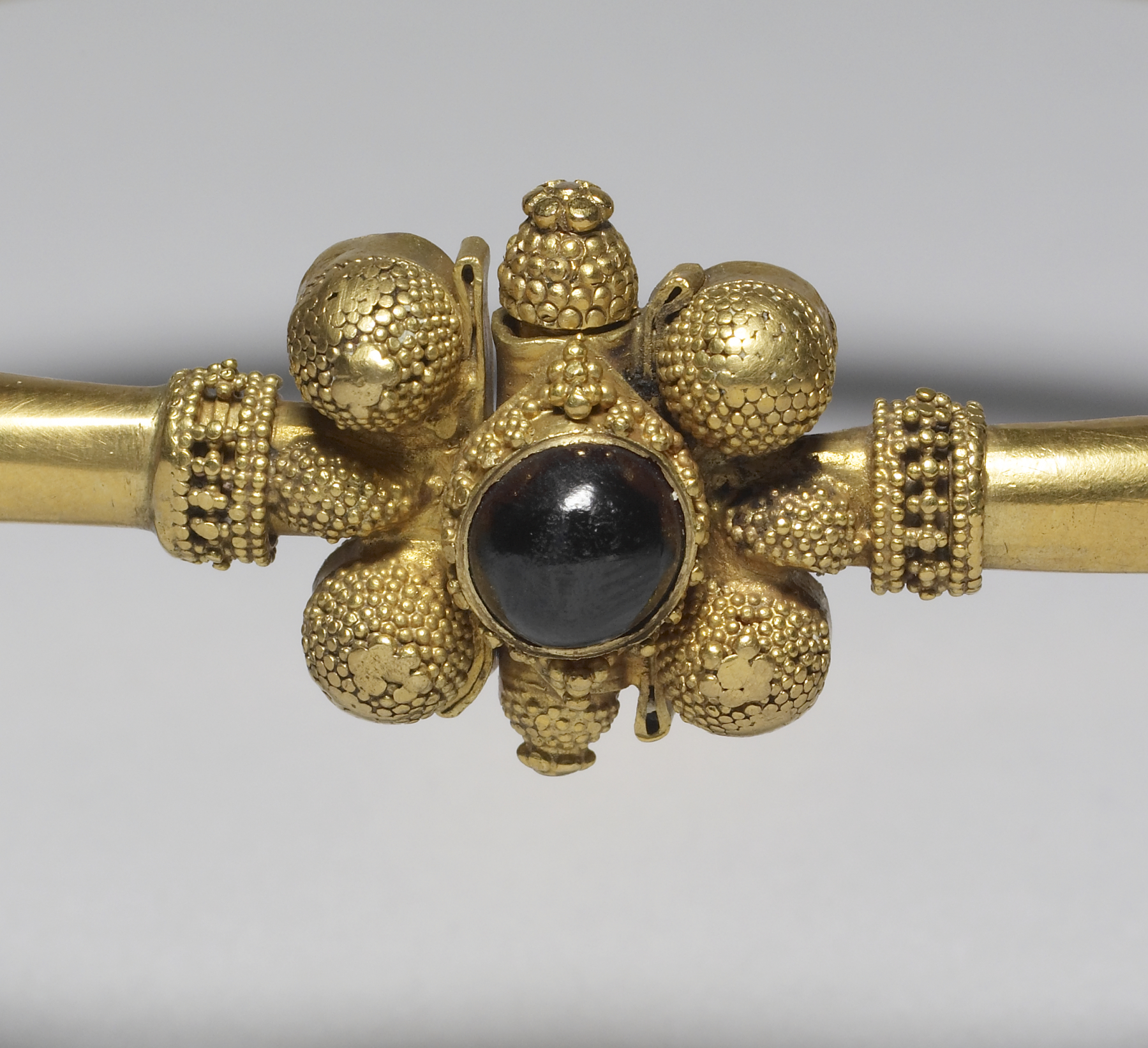
Hunnish bracelet, 5th century

This is a list of Huns (a Central Asian people who lived in Europe between the 4th and 6th centuries AD) and of people of Hunnish descent, sorted by field and name:

== Military commanders ==
- Attila (c. 406-453), ruler of the Huns from 434 to 453
- Balamber (fl. c. 313 – 378), chieftain, attested to by Jordanes
- Bleda (c. 400-445), brother to Attila and co-leader of the Huns
- Charaton (fl. 412-420), Hun leader, attested to by Olympiodorus
- Dengizich (fl. 454-469), brother to Ernak and Ellac, co-leader of the Huns
- Ellac (fl. 448-454), eldest son of Attila and leader of the Huns until his death at the Battle of Nedao
- Ernak (fl. 454-469), brother to Ernak and Ellac, last known leader of the Huns
- Octar (fl. 420-430), brother to Rugila and co-leader of the Huns
- Rugila (c. 365-435), brother to Octar and co-leader of the Huns
- Tuldila (fl. 458), commander in the Western Roman Empire, of Hunnish descent
- Uldin (died c. 412), military leader and ruler of the Huns, who defeated the Gothic magister militum Gainas, sending his head to Arcadius as a diplomatic gift

== Politicians, ministers, ambassadors, religious figures ==
- Edeko (fl. 449), prominent Hun, Attila's deputy and his ambassador to the Byzantine Empire (in 449), probably the father of Odoacer

== Others ==
- Adamis (fl. 449), Hunnish supervisor
- Atakam (fl. 448), Hun prince and deserter impaled by Attila
- Emnetzur (fl. 460), Hun nobleman, blood relative of Attila
- Eskam's daughter (fl. 448), daughter of Eskam and wife of Attila
- Eslas (fl. 450), Hun orator, negotiator, custodian and ambassador
- Gordas (fl. c. 503 – 528), prince of the Crimean Huns
- Hunor, forefather of the Huns and the Magyars according to Hungarian legend, the ancestor of Attila and Árpád
- Kreka (fl. 448), wife of Attila
- Magor, legendary ancestor of the Huns and the Magyars, an ancestor of Attila and Árpád
- Mamas (fl. 448), Hun prince and deserter impaled by Attila
- Oebarsius (Aybars) (fl. 440), Hunnic nobleman, brother of Mundzuk
- Ortlieb, legendary prince of Burgundian and Hunnic descent, the son of Kriemhild and Etzel
- Sifka, Hunnic princess appearing in the Hervarar saga ok Heiðreks, mother of Hlöd by Heidrek, king of the Geats
- Ultzindur (fl. 460), Hun nobleman, blood relative of Attila

== See also ==
- List of Xiongnu rulers (Chanyus)
