= List of kings of the Huns =

King of the Huns
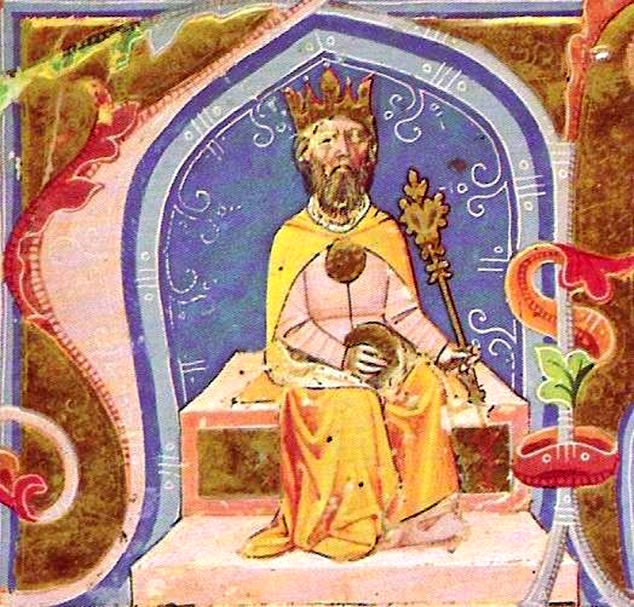
- Last sole king Attila depicted in Chronicon Pictum; 434 – 453

Details
- First monarch: Balamber
- Last monarch: Ernak
- Formed: c. 360s
- Abolished: after 469
- Residence: Pannonia
- Appointer: Unspecified, de facto hereditary
- Pretender: None

This is a list of kings of the Huns from the arrival of the Huns in Europe in the 360s/370s until the fall of the Hunnic Empire in 469 AD.

The following list starts with Balamber, the first known king of the Huns, who is thought to be one of the earliest, if not the first, Hun king since their arrival in Pannonia. Jordanes recounts in his Getica that Balamber crushed the Ostrogoths in the 370s, probably some time between 370 and 376. The existence of Balamber, however, is disputed by some historians, thus making Uldin the first undisputed king of the Huns.

The Huns are thought to have had a sole king and several "sub-kings", or to have ruled in a dual-monarchy, similarly to their predecessors, the Xiongnu. Some historians think that the Huns divided their empire in halves, with one king ruling the eastern part of the empire and another king ruling the western part (e.g. Attila and Bleda).

Attila is the last ascertained sole king of the Huns, a position he apparently assumed after murdering his brother Bleda. Attila appointed his eldest son, Ellac, as King of Pontic Scythia as well as bestowing on him the additional title of King of the Akatziri. Attila also displayed a particular fondness for his younger son, Ernak, for whom the king's shamans had prophesied an important role in continuing his line. Attila, however, died unexpectedly in 453, before naming an heir, and his many sons fought among themselves for the empire, tearing it apart. Ellac died shortly after his father, at the decisive Battle of Nedao. Dengizich, another son of Attila, perished in 469. Attila's young son, Ernak, managed to maintain peaceful relations with the Romans living in the Dobruja region.

According to Hungarian legend, one of the numerous children of Attila was named Csaba. He is described as a skilled warrior and general in Hungarian chronicles who led his people to many victories. In the Hungarian chronicles, he is regarded as the ancestor of the Aba clan. According to Hungarian chronicles and tradition, also Árpád was a descendant of Attila, though it is unclear whether he descended from him through Csaba or another of his children. Hungarian chronicles also claim that the Magyars and the Huns descend from two brothers, Hunor and Magor, and their respective wives, the daughters of Dula, or Dulo. Attila's younger son, Ernak is a namesake of a member of the so-called Dulo clan, the first ruler of the Bulgars according to the Nominalia of the Bulgarian khans, living in the days of Attila. The person mentioned in the Nominalia is considered to be Ernak himself, or at least of Attilid descent.

Portrait	Name	Reign	Marriage(s)	Notes
== Ménrót dynasty (legendary) ==
	Magor	According to the gestas, when Hunor arrived in Pannonia he found the Alans (in this case referring to the Iazyges) who arrived in c. 200 CE., which means they lived sometime between c. 200s AD and c. 360s AD.	Alan princess, daughter of Dulo, or Dula	Magor was one of the two legendary brothers who, according to Hungarian chronicles, is the ancestor of the Huns and of the Magyars. It is said he was a son of Ménrót, king of the Scythians.
	Hunor	According to the gestas, when Hunor arrived in Pannonia he found the Alans (in this case referring to the Iazyges) who arrived in c. 200 CE., which means they lived sometime between c. 200s AD and c. 360s AD.	Alan princess, daughter of Dula	Hunor was, according to Hungarian chronicles, a son of the Scythian king Ménrót and his wife Eneth. He was the brother of Magor, and together with him the ancestor of the Magyars and of the Huns. According to legend, he and his brother were led to the Meotis marshes by a stag they encountered while hunting. They then established themselves there after asking permission to their father.
== Non-dynastic (360–434) ==
	Balamber	c. 360s – c. 378	Vadamerca	Balamber is the first known king of the Huns. His historicity, however, is disputed by some historians. If Balamber did indeed exist, he was probably the king under whom the Huns arrived in Pannonia. He is noted by Jordanes as having crushed the Ostrogoths in the 370s, probably around 376 AD. Balamber fought the Goths in three battles. After being defeated in the first two clashes, he managed to lead his Huns to victory, defeating the Goths in the third and decisive battle, in which he killed their king Vinitharius with an arrow, by the river named Erac. He then took Vinitharius's granddaughter Vadamerca in marriage.
	Uldin; Ουλδης, Uldin, Huldin	400– 412	Unknown	He was born in the late 4th century, and is attested as king of Muntenia in 400. The extension of his kingdom to the north and east is unknown, but to the west it probably reached the Danube, around which the Huns were settled since at least 378. Uldin defeated magister militium Gainas, beheading him and sending his head as a diplomatic gift to the Romans. He further fought alongside the Romans in Italy, notably at the battle of Faesulae, where he helped defeating and killing Radagaisus, king of the Goths. He later conquered Castra Martis in Dacia Ripensis.
	Charaton; Χαράτωνς	412– 413	Unknown	Charaton was born in the late 4th century, and reigned since as early as 412. He is noted for receiving the Roman ambassador Olympiodorus of Thebes, who noted the skills of the Hun kings with the bow, and Charaton's anger at the unfair assassination of a certain Donatus.
	Octar; Ούπταρος	413– 430	Unknown	Octar ruled at the same time as his brother Rugila, likely with a geographical division, ruling the western part of the Hunnic Empire while his brother ruled in the east. Octar was also brother of Mundzuk, who never became king himself, but begat future kings Bleda and Attila.
	Rugila; Ρούγας, Ρουας, Ρωίλας	413– 434	Unknown	Rugila played a major role in the Huns' early victories against the Romans. He initially ruled the empire jointly with his brother Octar, but then became the sole king after the latter died in a campaign against the Burgundians in 430. Around 423 or 431, the Romans ceded part of Pannonia Prima to him.
	Bleda; Βλήδας, Βλέδας, Βλίδας, Bleda	434– 445	Governor of the Pannonian village by the lake	Bleda was born around 390, the son of Mundzuk, a Hun nobleman from the royal family, the brother of king Rugila. He managed to double the Roman tribute of 350 Roman pounds (ca. 114.5 kg) of gold, regain Hunnish fugitives and make the Romans open their markets to traders from the Hunnic Empire. He led the Hunnish army to the conquest of the Balkans together with his brother Attila, taking Margus (present-day Požarevac), Viminacium (present-day Kostolac), Singidunum (modern Belgrade) and Sirmium (modern Sremska Mitrovica) in 441, and, two years later, Ratiaria, Naissus, Serdica, after which they defeated and destroyed the Roman forces around Constantinople before retiring and forcing the Romans to a new treaty which provided the Huns with 6,000 Roman pounds (ca. 1,963 kg) of gold and a tripled yearly tribute, rising to 2,100 Roman pounds (ca. 687 kg). After this, Bleda died, according to classical sources, killed by his brother.
== Attilid dynasty (434–after 469) ==
	Attila; Ἀττίλα	434 – 453	Kreka; Eskam's daughter Ildico	Attila was the last sole king of the Huns. He ruled a vast empire, that from its firm center in Pannonia extended to the Baltic Sea and the "islands of the Ocean" in the north, and to the Caspian Sea in the east. Attila won most, if not all, of his battles. Beside his successful campaigns in the Balkans, Thrace and Greece with his brother Bleda, he defeated the Romans at the Battle of the Utus and captured and destroyed Aquileia, sacked Padua, Mantua, Vicentia, Verona, Brescia, and Bergamo, before besieging and capturing Milan. His only possible defeat came at the Battle of the Catalaunian Plains. The outcome of this battle is disputed, with most historians agreeing that it was inconclusive. However, some modern historians consider it a Hunnish victory, thus making Attila one of the major undefeated kings in history. He died unexpectedly and of natural causes in 453, as reported by a contemporary account, though a later report, later developed into legend, claims Attila was murdered by one of his wives. He was succeeded by his son Ellac and Ellac's brothers.
	Ellac	453 – 454	Unknown	Ellac was the eldest son of king Attila, born to Kreka, one of his chief wives. By 448, he was appointed King of the Nations of Pontic Scythia by his father, also receiving the title of King of the Akatziri. After his father's death in 453, he and his brothers apparently divided the crumbling empire among themselves. It is not known whether Ellac inherited the title of sole king. At any rate, he died shortly after his father, in 454, at the decisive Battle of Nedao. He was succeeded by his brothers Dengizich and Ernak. According to Hungarian tradition, one of the other, numerous children of Attila, and brother of Ellac, was named Csaba.
	Dengizich; Δεγγιζίχ, Δινζίριχος	454 – 469	Unknown	Dengizich inherited the empire after the death of his father, or possibly of his elder brother Ellac. He ruled over what remained of the Hunnic Empire, the Huns and the allied and subjugated Germanic tribes in dual kingship with his brother Ernak, but with separate divisions of land. Dengizich died in 469 after his failed invasion of the Eastern Roman Empire.
	Ernak; Ήρνάχ, Ирникъ, Hernac, Irnik	454 – after 469	Unknown	Ernak was the youngest son of Attila, whom the Hun prophets had foretold would continue the line of Attila and of his people. He is often identified with Irnik from the Nominalia of the Bulgarian khans, who is noted as a descendant of the Dulo clan (pictured) and leader of the Bulgars for 150 years, starting approximately from 437 AD.
	Csaba (legendary)	454 – after 469	Chorasminian woman	According to Hungarian chroniclers Simon of Kéza and Mark of Kalt, the Aba clan descended from Csaba. Mark additionally claimed that Árpád dynasty were also Csaba's descendants. (Note: Anonymus, notary of Béla III, linked the Árpád dynasty to Attila, yet he did not specify from which of Attila's sons; he also did not link Ed(u), his brother Edumen, their Aba descendants: e.g. Pata, Samuel Aba, etc. to Attila; instead he ascribed them Cuman ancestry.)

== See also ==
- History of the Huns
- List of Huns
