= Foederati =

Peoples and cities bound by a treaty, typically with ancient Rome

Foederati (/ˌfɛdəˈreɪtaɪ/ FED-ə-RAY-ty; singular: foederatus /ˌfɛdəˈreɪtəs/ FED-ə-RAY-təs) were peoples and cities bound by a treaty, known as foedus, with Rome. During the Roman Republic, the term identified the socii, but during the Roman Empire, it was used to describe foreign states, client kingdoms or barbarian tribes to which the empire provided benefits in exchange for military assistance. The term was also used, especially under the empire, for groups of barbarian mercenaries of various sizes who were typically allowed to settle within the empire.

== Roman Republic ==
In the early Roman Republic, foederati were tribes that were bound by a treaty (foedus /ˈfiːdəs/) to come to the defence of Rome but were neither Roman colonies nor beneficiaries of Roman citizenship (civitas). Members of the Latini tribe were considered blood allies, but the rest were federates or socii. The friction between the treaty obligations without the corresponding benefits of Romanity led to the Social War between the Romans, with a few close allies, and the disaffected socii. A law of 90 BC (Lex Julia) offered Roman citizenship to the federate states that accepted the terms. Not all cities were prepared to be absorbed into the Roman res publica (Heraclea and Naples). Other foederati lay outside Roman Italy such as Gades (Cádiz) and Massilia (Marseille).

== Roman Empire ==
The term foederati had its usage and meaning extended by the Romans' practice of subsidising entire barbarian tribes such as the Franks, Vandals, Alans, Huns and the Visigoths, the last being the best known, in exchange for providing warriors to fight in the Roman armies. Alaric I began his career leading a band of Gothic foederati.

At first, the Roman subsidy took the form of money or food, but as tax revenues dwindled in the 4th and the 5th centuries, the foederati were billeted on local landowners, which became identical to being allowed to settle on Roman territory. Large local landowners living in distant border provinces (see "marches") on extensive villas, which were largely self-sufficient, found their loyalties to the central authority, which were already conflicted by other developments, further compromised in such situations. As loyalties wavered and became more local, the empire then began to devolve into smaller territories and closer personal fealties.

=== 4th century ===
The Franks became foederati in 358, when Emperor Julian let them keep the areas in northern Roman Gaul, which had been depopulated during the preceding century. Roman soldiers defended the Rhine and had major armies 100 miles (160 km) south and west of the Rhine. Frankish settlers were established in the areas north and east of the Romans and helped the Roman defence by providing intelligence and a buffer state. The breach of the Rhine borders in the frozen winter of 406 and 407 ended the Roman presence along the Rhine when both the Romans and the allied Franks were overrun by a massive tribal migration of Vandals and Alans.

In 376, some of the Goths asked Emperor Valens to allow them to settle on the southern bank of the Danube River and were accepted into the empire as foederati. The same Goths then revolted in retaliation for abuses and defeated the Romans in the Battle of Adrianople in 378. The critical loss of military manpower thereafter forced the Empire to rely much more on foederati levies.

The loyalty of the tribes and their chieftains was never reliable, and in 395, the Visigoths, now under the lead of Alaric, once again rose in rebellion. The father of one of the most powerful late Roman generals, Stilicho, rose from the ranks of the foederati.

=== 5th century ===
In the War of Radagaisus in 406 AD, Stilicho defeated the Gothic king Radagaisus and his combined Vandal and Gothic army only with the support of the Gothic chieftain Sarus and the Hunnic ruler Uldin.

In 423, the general Flavius Aetius entered the service of the usurper Joannes as cura palatii and was sent by Joannes to ask the Huns for assistance. Joannes, a high-ranking officer, lacked a strong army and fortified himself in his capital, Ravenna, where he was killed in the summer of 425. Soon, Aetius returned to Italy with a large force of Huns to find that power in the west was now in the hands of Valentinian III and his mother, Galla Placidia. After fighting against Aspar's army, Aetius managed a compromise with Galla Placidia. He sent back his Hunnic army and in return obtained the rank of comes et magister militum per Gallias, the commander-in-chief of the Roman Army in Gaul.

Around 418 (or 426), Attaces, the king of the Alans, fell in battle against the Visigoths, who were still allies of Rome in Hispania, and most of the surviving Alans appealed to Gunderic. Their request was accepted by Gunderic, who thus became King of the Vandals and Alans.

Late in Gunderic's reign, the Vandals themselves began to clash more and more with the Visigothic foederati and often got the worse of these battles because the Visigoths were so much more numerous. After Gunderic died early in 428, the Vandals elected his half-brother, Genseric, as the successor, and Genseric left Iberia to the Visigoths to invade Roman Africa.

By the 5th century, lacking the wealth needed to pay and train a professional army, the Western Roman Empire's military strength was almost entirely reliant on foederati units. In 451, Attila the Hun was defeated only with help of the foederati, who included the Visigoths, Franks, Alans and Saxons. The foederati would deliver the fatal blow to the dying nominal Western Roman Empire in 476, when their commander, Odoacer, deposed the usurping Western Emperor Romulus Augustulus and sent the imperial insignia back to Constantinople with the Senate's request for the 81-year-old west–east subdivision of the empire to be abolished. Even before the eventual fall of the Western Roman Empire in 476, several kingdoms with the status of foederati had managed to gain a full independence that was formally recognised by the Western Roman Empire, such as the Vandals in the peace treaty concluded in 442 between their king, Genseric, and Valentinian III and the Visigoths through the peace treaty concluded in 475 between their king Euric and Julius Nepos.

After the collapse of the Hunnic Empire, the Ostrogoths entered relations with the Eastern Roman Empire and were settled in Pannonia to become foederati of the Byzantines. During the latter half of the 5th century, the Ostrogoths' relationship with the Byzantines started to shift from friendship to enmity, just like the Visigoths before them, and Ostrogoth King, Theoderic the Great frequently led armies that ravaged the provinces of the Eastern Roman Empire and eventually threatened Constantinople itself. Eventually, Theoderic and Emperor Zeno worked out an arrangement beneficial to both sides in which Theoderic invaded Odoacer's kingdom and eventually conquered Italy.

=== 6th century ===
Foederati (transliterated in Greek as Φοιδερᾶτοι or translated as Σύμμαχοι) were still present in the East Roman army during the 6th century. Belisarius' and Narses' victorious armies included many foederati, but by this time the term in Greek refers to units that may once have included large numbers of non-Romans but have become professional, regular units in the Roman army that included Romans. These armies also included non-Roman elements such as Hunnic archers and Herule mercenaries who were more akin to traditional foederati but who were now referred to as symmachoi. At the Battle of Taginae, a large contingent of the Byzantine army was made up of Lombards, Gepids and Bulgars.

In the east, foederati were formed out of several Arab tribes to protect against the Persian-allied Arab Lakhmids and the tribes of the Arabian peninsula. Among these foederati were the Tanukhids, Banu Judham, Banu Amela and the Ghassanids. The term continues to be attested in the Eastern Roman armies until around the reign of Maurice. Although no longer as important as in the sixth century, a unit of foederati appear in the Byzantine thema of the Anatolikon in the ninth century.

== See also ==
- Ammianus Marcellinus
- Foedus Cassianum
- Laeti
- Numerus (Roman military unit)
- Varangian Guard
- Zosimus

== Bibliography ==
- Maspero, Jean (1912). "Φοιδερᾶτοι et Στρατιῶται dans l'armée byzantine au VI siècle". Byzantinische Zeitschrift. 21 (1): 97–109. doi:10.1515/byzs.1912.21.1.97. S2CID 192034477.
- McMahon, Lucas (2014). "The Foederati, the Phoideratoi, and the Symmachoi of the Late Antique East (ca. A.D. 400-650)". academia.edu.
