= 405 =

405 in various calendars
- Gregorian calendar: 405; CDV
- Ab urbe condita: 1158
- Assyrian calendar: 5155
- Balinese saka calendar: 326–327
- Bengali calendar: −189 – −188
- Berber calendar: 1355
- Buddhist calendar: 949
- Burmese calendar: −233
- Byzantine calendar: 5913–5914
- Chinese calendar: 甲辰年 (Wood Dragon); 3102 or 2895 — to — 乙巳年 (Wood Snake); 3103 or 2896
- Coptic calendar: 121–122
- Discordian calendar: 1571
- Ethiopian calendar: 397–398
- Hebrew calendar: 4165–4166
- Hindu calendars
- Vikram Samvat: 461–462
- Shaka Samvat: 326–327
- Kali Yuga: 3505–3506
- Holocene calendar: 10405
- Iranian calendar: 217 BP – 216 BP
- Islamic calendar: 224 BH – 223 BH
- Javanese calendar: 288–289
- Julian calendar: 405; CDV
- Korean calendar: 2738
- Minguo calendar: 1507 before ROC 民前1507年
- Nanakshahi calendar: −1063
- Seleucid era: 716/717 AG
- Thai solar calendar: 947–948
- Tibetan calendar: ཤིང་ཕོ་འབྲུག་ལོ་ (male Wood-Dragon); 531 or 150 or −622 — to — ཤིང་མོ་སྦྲུལ་ལོ་ (female Wood-Snake); 532 or 151 or −621

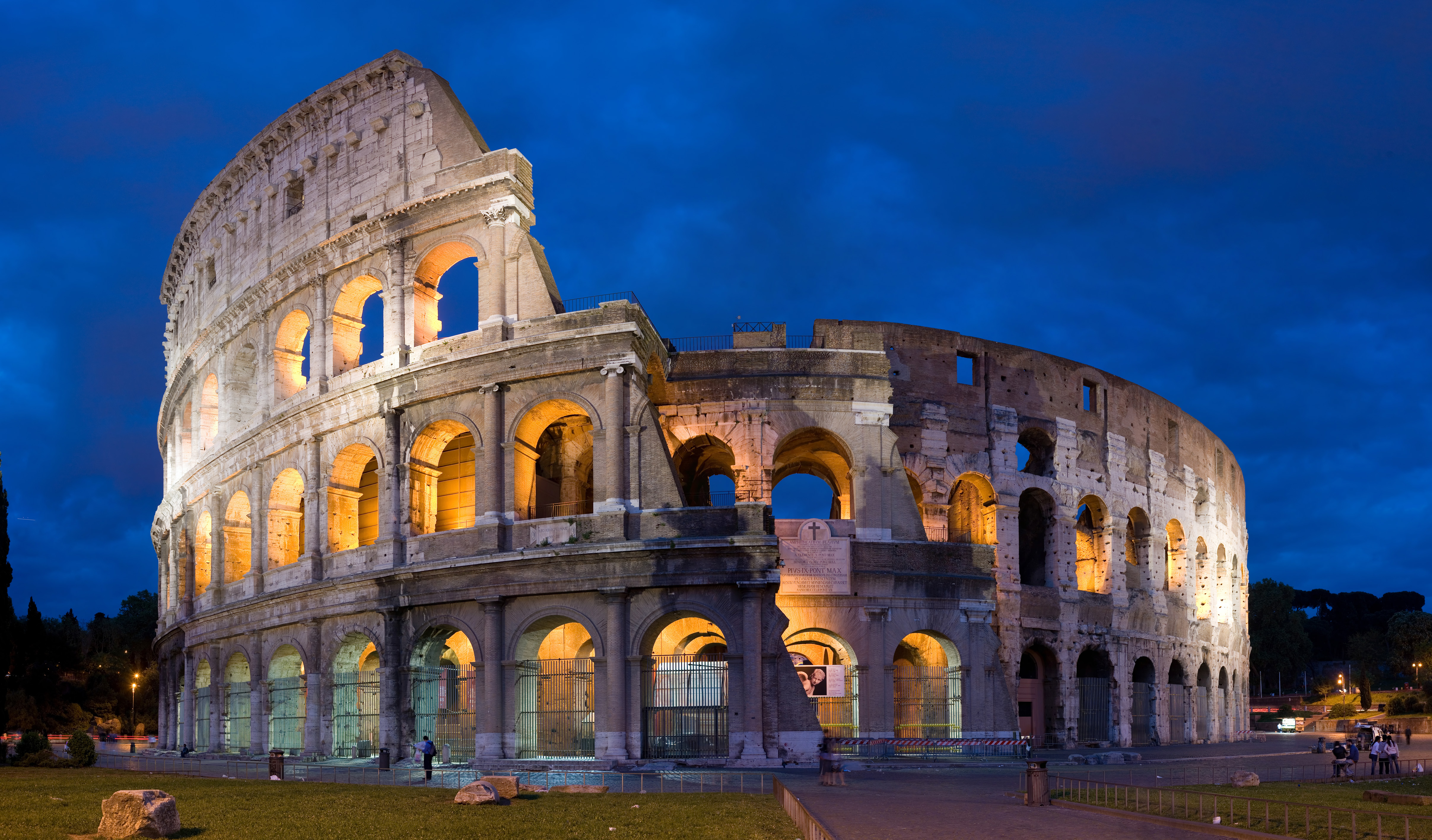
The Colosseum in Rome

Year 405 (CDV) was a common year starting on Sunday of the Julian calendar. At the time, it was known as the Year of the Consulship of Stilicho and Anthemius (or, less frequently, year 1158 Ab urbe condita). The denomination 405 for this year has been used since the early medieval period, when the Anno Domini calendar era became the prevalent method in Europe for naming years.

== Events ==
=== By place ===
==== Roman Empire ====
- Emperor Honorius closes the Flavian Amphitheatre (Colosseum), in an austerity move that abolishes amusements.
- Stilicho, Roman general (magister militum), orders the Sibylline Books to be burned, according to the Roman poet Rutilius Claudius Namatianus.
- Stilicho crushes a coalition of Asding Vandals, Ostrogoths and Quadi with an army raised from forces of the Rhine frontier, leaving this sector dangerously weakened.
- War of Radagaisus: King Radagaisus leads an invasion with a force of 20,000 men and crosses the Alps. He spends the winter in the Po Valley and is observed by Stilicho, who lacks sufficient strength to prepare an offensive against the invading German tribes. The exact numbers of the migration are unknown, probably nearly 100,000, including Alans, Burgundians, Goths, Vandals, and other smaller tribes.
- Flavius Aetius is sent as a child hostage at the court of Alaric I, king of the Visigoths.

==== Asia ====
- The Khitan are first mentioned in Chinese chronicles. They wander along the boundaries of Kara-muren, and form part of the Donghu (Tong-hou) confederation.
- Jeonji becomes king of the Korean kingdom of Baekje.

=== By topic ===
==== Arts and Sciences ====
- The Armenian alphabet is devised by Mesrop Mashtots.
- The Japanese court officially adopts the Chinese writing system (approximate date).
- Theon of Alexandria, Greek mathematician, dies at age 70 (approximate), having been helped in his work by his daughter Hypatia.

==== Religion ====
- Jerome's Vulgate translation of the Bible into Latin is completed by his translations of the Tanakh from the Hebrew language.
- In the Roman province of Africa, Augustine of Hippo opposes Donatism as a heresy.

== Births ==
- Ricimer, de facto ruler of the Western Roman Empire (approximate date)
- Salvian, Christian writer (approximate date)
- Yuan Qigui, empress and wife of Wen of Liu Song (d. 440)

== Deaths ==
- June 26 – Saint Vigilius, bishop of Trent (b. 353)
- November 11 – Arsacius of Tarsus, archbishop of Constantinople
- Moses the Black, Christian monk and priest (b. 330)
- Murong De, emperor of the Xianbei state Southern Yan (b. 336)
- Richu, emperor of Japan (approximate date)
- Theon of Alexandria, last director of the Library of Alexandria (approximate date)
