= Boz (king) =

- King of the Antes
- Reign: late 4th century
- Predecessor: Unknown
- Successor: Unknown
- Died: c. 380
- Issue: eight sons
- Religion: Slavic paganism

Boz (died c. 380) was the king of the Antes, an early Slavic people that lived in parts of present-day Ukraine. His story is mentioned by Jordanes in the Getica (550–551); in the preceding years, the Ostrogoths under Ermanaric had conquered a large number of tribes in Central Europe (see Oium), including the Antes. Some years after the Ostrogothic defeat by the invading Huns, a king named Vinitharius, Ermanaric's great-nephew, marched against the Antes of Boz and defeated them. Vinitharius condemned Boz, his sons, and seventy of his nobles, to crucifixion, in order to terrorize the Antes. These conflicts constitute the only pre-6th century contacts between Germanic and Slavic tribes documented in written sources.

== History ==
=== Background ===
Byzantine historian Jordanes wrote in his De origine actibusque Getarum (or "Getica", written in 550 or 551) that King Ermanaric (fl. 370s) of the Greuthungi (a Gothic tribe, most likely the same as the later Ostrogoths), member of the Amali dynasty, managed to subdue a large number of tribes in Europe (Cassiodorus called him "ruler of all nations of Scythia and Germania"), and he is said to have lastly subjugated the Wends (Slavs). Jordanes noted that the Gothic tribes regularly made raids into Slavic territory.

Jordanes mentioned three tribes of the same origin, that constituted the Slavs: Wends (West Slavs), Antes (East Slavs) and Sklaveni (South Slavs), and stated that the Antes were the bravest and strongest among these. He also stated that the Antes' rule was hereditary, while Procopius maintained that the Sklaveni and Antes "are not ruled by one man, but they have lived from old under a democracy". According to Ukrainian scholar Roman Smal-Stocki (1893–1969), the Antes received a strong ruling power and military organization over time from the Gothic influence. They inhabited the area between the Dniester and Dnieper, most likely in the region extending from the Vistula to the Danube mouth and eastwards to the Don. The tribal union of the Antes probably included some neighbouring West Slavic tribes. The Antes seem to have attempted to form their own state in the frontiers of, or even within, the Gothic state, judging by Jordanes' naming Boz as "king".

=== Story of Boz ===
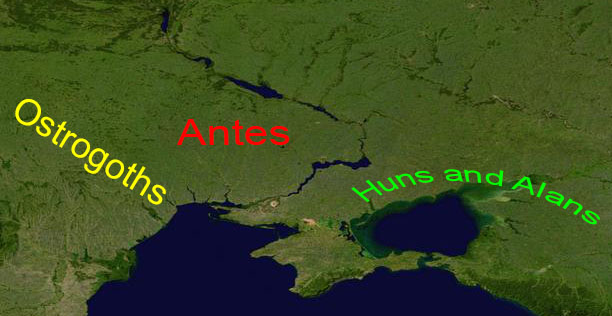
Approximate location of the Ostrogoths, Antes, Huns and Alans in c. 380.

The Huns, accompanied by the Alani whom they had just conquered, invaded Ermanaric's territories. Ermanaric, who feared devastation, took his own life. In the years following Ermanaric's death, there was a war between the section of the Ostrogoths who remained under Hun rule, and the Antes.

Ermanaric's great-nephew, Vinitharius, who disliked being under Hun rule, withdrew his forces and marched against the Antes in order to defeat them and to show his courage. This took place in the last quarter of the 4th century, possibly around 380. Boz, the king of the Antes (rex Antorum), had organized an alliance to defend the Antes, and managed to defeat Vinitharius in their first encounters, however, Vinitharius fought valiantly and managed to capture and crucify Boz, together with his sons and 70 of his chiefs (primates). Vinitharius left their bodies hanging to induce fear in those who had surrendered. These conflicts constitute the only pre-6th century contacts between Germanics and Slavs documented in written sources.

=== Aftermath ===
Afterwards, the Alans (according to contemporary Marcellinus, though Jordanes said it was Huns) rushed to rescue their kin, with a decisive battle fought against the Ostrogoths at the river Erak (now called Tylihul), in which the Ostrogoths were defeated and pushed west. The Ostrogoths eventually reached the lower Danube shores.

== Assessment ==
Historian Florin Curta believes that Jordanes' account regarding Boz and Vinitharius possibly originated in the Gothic oral tradition, given the narrative pattern of the story. He views of Boz as "quasi-legendary", as he is the only Slavic leader mentioned by Jordanes, while no leader is mentioned by Procopius.

Some historians have tried to identify Boz with Bus mentioned in the Tale of Igor's Campaign, in which boyars tell Sviatoslav I of Kiev (r. 945–972) of "Gothic maidens ... singing about the time of Bus", but this has been refuted. The first to connect the two was O. Ohonovskyj in 1876. He was later supported by S. Rospond.

Jordanes wrote his name in Late Latin as Boz ("Boz nomine"), though several manuscripts of the Getica use Box or Booz. There are various theories in etymological studies regarding the name.

The name has been rendered in the Slavic languages as Bož (Бож, Божь; transliterated as Bozh). One theory is that it derives from the Slavic word bog, "God", interpreted as "God's", "Godly". Polish linguist Stanisław Urbańczyk (1909–2000) mentioned *Božь (divine), *Vo(d)žь (chief), and '*Bosь (barefooted) as possibilities. Polish papyrologist Adam Łukaszewicz noted that "chief" was a possibility as it corresponded to the circumstances. Polish linguist Stanisław Rospond (1906–1982) concluded that Bos, "barefooted", was his name, and that the other etymologies put forward by Urbańczyk were less probable; he supported this by connecting Boz with Bus (Боусь) of The Tale of Igor's Campaign, as Omeljan Ohonovskyj (1833–1894) had first done in 1876. Ukrainian scholar Mykhailo Hrushevsky (1866–1934) speculated that his name was "perhaps Bozhko, Bozhydar, Bohdan". Ukrainian historian Bohdan Struminsky stressed that as the first palatalizations (gь > žь, etc.) had not yet occurred in Slavic at the time of Boz, *Božь was unconvincing and *Vo(d)žь "even less acceptable". Although supporting the connection with Bus, he assumed that it was Gothic, as *Bōs, found in similar variants as West Gothic Bōsō, of uncertain date, "probably meaning 'Sorcerer'", and Anglo-Saxon Bōsa, from the 7th century. Others have theorized an Iranian etymology (Bwzrmyhr or Burzmipuhr). German historian Franz Altheim (1898–1976) treated the Hunnic name Bozos as derived from buxs, a short form of Iranian bagabuxsa.

His title, rex Antorum, translates to "King of the Antes". Ukrainian historian Mykola Andrusiak (1902–1985) assumed, as Jordanes used rex for both Germanic rulers and the ruler of the Antes, that the Eastern Slavs had adopted "*kuning-" from the Goths and Slavicized it into "kǔnędzǐ" (knyaz), translated by Jordanes as "rex".

== Sources ==
- "Journal of Indo-European Studies". Journal of Indo-European Studies. 13: 204. 1985.
- Association of Ukrainians in Great Britain (1962). "The Ukrainian review". The Ukrainian Review. 10. Association of Ukrainians in Great Britain. ISSN 0041-6029. OCLC 1779352.
- Chirovsky, Nicholas L. (1976). On the Historical Beginnings of Eastern Slavic Europe: Readings. Shevchenko Scientific Society. p. 85.
- Curta, Florin (2001). The Making of the Slavs: History and Archaeology of the Lower Danube Region, c. 500–700. Cambridge: Cambridge University Press. ISBN 0-521-80202-4.
- Kobylinski, Zbigniew (2005). "The Slavs". In Fouracre, Paul (ed.). The New Cambridge Medieval History, Volume 1: c.500–c.700. Cambridge University Press. pp. 524–546. ISBN 978-0-521-36291-7.
- Lukaszewicz, Adam (1998). "De Sclavinis et sclavis…". Dialogues d'histoire ancienne (in French). 24 (2): 129–135. doi:10.3406/dha.1998.2394.
- Geary, Patrick J. (2010). Readings in Medieval History: The Early Middle Ages. University of Toronto Press. ISBN 978-1-4426-0116-1.
- Hrushevsky, Mykhailo (1997). History of Ukraine-Rus': From prehistory to the eleventh century. Kiyc Cius. ISBN 978-1-895571-19-6.
- Maenchen-Helfen, Otto (1973). The World of the Huns: Studies in Their History and Culture. University of California Press. ISBN 978-0-520-01596-8.
- Smal-Stocki, Roman (1950). Slavs and Teutons: the oldest Germanic-Slavic relations. Bruce. p. 67.
- Struminskyj, Bohdan (1980). "Were the Antes Eastern Slavs?" (PDF). Harvard Ukrainian Studies. 3–4 (2): 788–789. JSTOR 41035872. Archived from the original (PDF) on 2015-12-20.

Regnal titles
| First | King of the Antes late 4th century | Vacant Title next held by Idarisius |
