= Siege of Florence =

Siege of Florence may refer to:

- Siege of Florence (405), part of the barbarian invasion of the Roman Empire
- Siege of Florence (1312), part of the Wars of the Guelphs and Ghibellines
- Siege of Florence (1529–1530), part of the War of the League of Cognac

== See also ==
- History of Florence
