= Balamir =

- For the late 4th-century Hun leader, see Balamber a.k.a. Balamur, Balamir.
- For the 20th-century Turkish wrestling olympian, see Halit Balamir
