= Siege of Florence (405) =

Part of the barbarian invasion of the Roman Empire

- Part of the War of Radagaisus
| Date | 405 or 406 AD |
| Location | Florence |
| Result | Western Roman victory; Florence is nearly destroyed |

Belligerents
| Goths | Western Roman Empire; Hunnic Empire |

Commanders and leaders
| Radagaisus | Stilicho; Uldin the Hun; Sarus the Goth |

Strength
| 20,000 | 15,000–20,000 |

Casualties and losses
| 12,000+ | Unknown |

The siege of Florence took place in 405 or 406 AD during the War of Radagaisus between the Goths and the Roman Empire in Florence.

== Background ==
In 402, the Geougen, a nomadic Tartar people of northern Asia who had gradually replaced the Sienpi as the dominant people of the vast plains of Mongolia and Siberia during the fourth century, extended their conquests by defeating the Huns on the upper Volga, who themselves had once been masters of the lands from which their victors had come. Pushed westwards by this advance of the East Asian hordes, the Huns retreated further into Europe, driving from their homeland the Suevi, Vandals and Burgundians who had occupied central Europe from the Vistula to the Elbe.

Radagaisus, a warrior from the area of present-day Mecklenburg, took command of a formidable section of these tribes, who were determined to unite for the invasion of the Roman Empire, in whose territory they hoped to find ample space for settlement, undisturbed by the constant attacks of the Asian barbarians who were overrunning the areas of present-day Poland and Germany.

In late 405 or early 406, Radagaisus and his vast army, recruited from some of the wandering tribes of the Alani and some of Alaric's Goths, angered by their recent defeat, broke across the undefended Danube frontier and entered Rhaetia. Stilicho, Master General of the West, had recently stripped the other provinces, including those on the Rhine and Danube, of their regular garrisons in order to repel Alaric's first invasion of Italy. This allowed Radagaisus to cross the Alps into Italy before meeting Stilicho's resistance.

== Battle ==
Radagaisus marched south into Italy, leaving behind the devastated farmlands and cities of the province, while Stilicho took up residence in Pavia, which he declared the rendezvous point for the Roman and barbarian auxiliaries he was calling in from all directions to defend Italy. Meanwhile, the cowardly figurehead of the Western Empire, Honorius, took refuge in the fortified city of Ravenna, which had been made the capital of the West (rather than the more exposed Milan) after Alaric's invasion in 401.

For reasons unknown, Radagisus halted his march on Rome to besiege the great and prosperous city of Florence. The city was defended by a small garrison, but with remarkable devotion and patriotism. When the defenders of the city faltered in the face of the relentless barbarian assault, their spirits were revived by the timely report of the appearance of Bishop Ambrose of Milan in a night vision to a citizen of the city, in which he promised the intercession of Providence for the succour of the inhabitants. Shortly afterwards, Stilicho arrived with his army and crushed the besieging barbarian army in the decisive battle of Faesulae (406).

== Bibliography ==
- Heather, Peter (2006). The Fall of the Roman Empire: A New History of Rome and the Barbarians. New York, New York: Oxford University Press. ISBN 978-0-19-532541-6.
- Hughes, Ian (2015). Stilicho: The Vandal Who Saved Rome. South Yorkshire, England: Pen & Sword Military. ISBN 978-1-47382-900-8.
