= Vithimir =

Greuthungi (Gothic) king

Vithimir or Vithimer (in Latin: Vithimiris) was a king of the Greuthungi, ruling for some unspecified time in the area of present-day southern Ukraine.

== Reign ==
He succeeded to Ermanaric, meaning that he probably reigned in 376. Ammianus Marcellinus, the only known source on him, states that after Ermanaric's death he tried to resist the Alani, who were allied with the Huns, with the help of other Huns hired as mercenaries. He did so "for some time" (aliquantisper), but eventually, "after many defeats" (post multas clades), he died in battle. It is then assumed that he most probably ruled in 376, possibly also in 375.

According to Herwig Wolfram, Vithimiris was "certainly not" the son of Ermanaric.

His son Viderichus was too young at that time to rule, so the actual reign was in the hands of Alatheus and Saphrax, his subordinate commanders, as Michael Kulikowski labels them.

There is also a parallel story of these events, told by Jordanes, the only other author to mention Ermanaric. However, Jordanes does not know Vithimiris; he narrates that after Ermanaric's death, a relative of his, Vinitharius by name, accepted the reign. He ruled barely for a year (vix anni spatio) and then he had to face the Huns in battle. The Hunnic king Balamber waged a long war on Vinitharius (diuque certati) and only in the third battle, he managed to kill him. However, there are doubts about the very existence of Balamber or any other Hunnic king at that time.

Vithimiris
Regnal titles
Preceded by Ermanaric	King of the Greuthungi c. 375	Succeeded by Alatheus and Saphrax as regents
