= Vadamerca =

Gothic princess

Vadamerca or Valadamarca (fl. 370s) may have been a Gothic princess and Goth royal family member by birth, and consort of the Rex Hunnorum Balamber, possibly the first ruler of the Huns. The only extant source that mentions her or Balamber is Jordanes' Getica, and it is possible that both are unhistorical.

== Name ==
The first element is probably Gothic valdan, or waldan, meaning 'to rule (a household), to govern’, from an earlier PGmc walđanan. The second element is marka, 'horse', from PGmc *marχaz, an early loan from Celtic. Another female name with the same second element is attested from West Francia, Childomarca.

== Biography ==
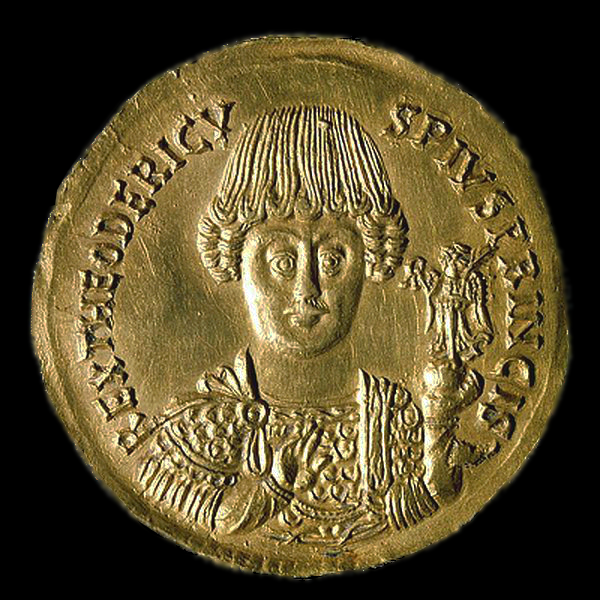
Vadamerca's nephew (or first cousin once removed) Theodoric

The only source that mentions the existence of a Gothic princess named Vadamerca or her husband Balamber is Jordanes' Getica, which may derive mention of both from Gothic oral tradition. According to Jordanes, Vadamerca was the granddaughter of Vinitharius, king of the Goths, and a member of the Amal dynasty. Arne Søby Christensen notes several chronological problems with Jordanes's narrative surrounding Vadamerca and suggests that it may not be historical.

Her grandfather Vinitharius fought three battles against the Huns, who were led by Balamber. He was successful in the first two clashes, but eventually lost the third fight, which took place by the river Erac. Vinitharius died on this occasion, as he was killed by king Balamber with an arrow shot to his head.

After the victory, Balamber, the first known king of the Huns, took Vadamerca in marriage. Such marriage consolidated his rule over the Goths. These types of royal intermarriages (cf. Heqin) were part of the Hun mode of conquest. He ruled the Goths peacefully and consented them to be governed by a Goth. However, the Huns would themselves choose their Gothic ruler.

== Works cited ==
- Christensen, Arne Søby (2002). Cassiodorus, Jordanes and the History of the Goths Studies in a Migration Myth. University of Chicago Press. p. 140. ISBN 9788772897103.
- Förstemann, Ernst (1900). Altdeutsches Namenbuch, Band 1: Personennamen (2 ed.). Bonn.
- Kim, Hyun Jin (2013). The Huns, Rome and the Birth of Europe. Cambridge University Press. ISBN 9781107067226.
- Kim, Hyun Jin (2015). The Huns. Taylor & Francis. ISBN 9781317340904.
- Orel, Vladimir E. (2003). A Handbook of Germanic Etymology. Brill. ISBN 978-90-04-12875-0.
- Raffensperger, Christian; Olster, David, eds. (2018). Radical Traditionalism The Influence of Walter Kaegi in Late Antique, Byzantine, and Medieval Studies. Lexington Books. p. 110. ISBN 9781498584876.
- Wolfram, Herwig (1990). History of the Goths. University of California Press. ISBN 9780520069831.
