= Bozhko =

Bozhko is a surname. Notable people with the surname include:

- Sergei Bozhko (born 1973), Russian footballer
- Serhii Bozhko (1997–2022), Ukrainian soldier
- Vladimir Bozhko (born 1949), Kazakhstani governmental minister
