= Emnetzur =

5th-century Hun nobleman

Emnetzur (fl. 460) was a Hun nobleman and a blood relative of Attila.

He is said to have resided in the Danube region after Attila (i.e. after his death and collapse of his empire), along with Ultzindur. They held "Oescus, Utum and Almus on the right bank of the Danube", in Dacia Ripensis.
