= Uldin =

Chieftain of the Huns

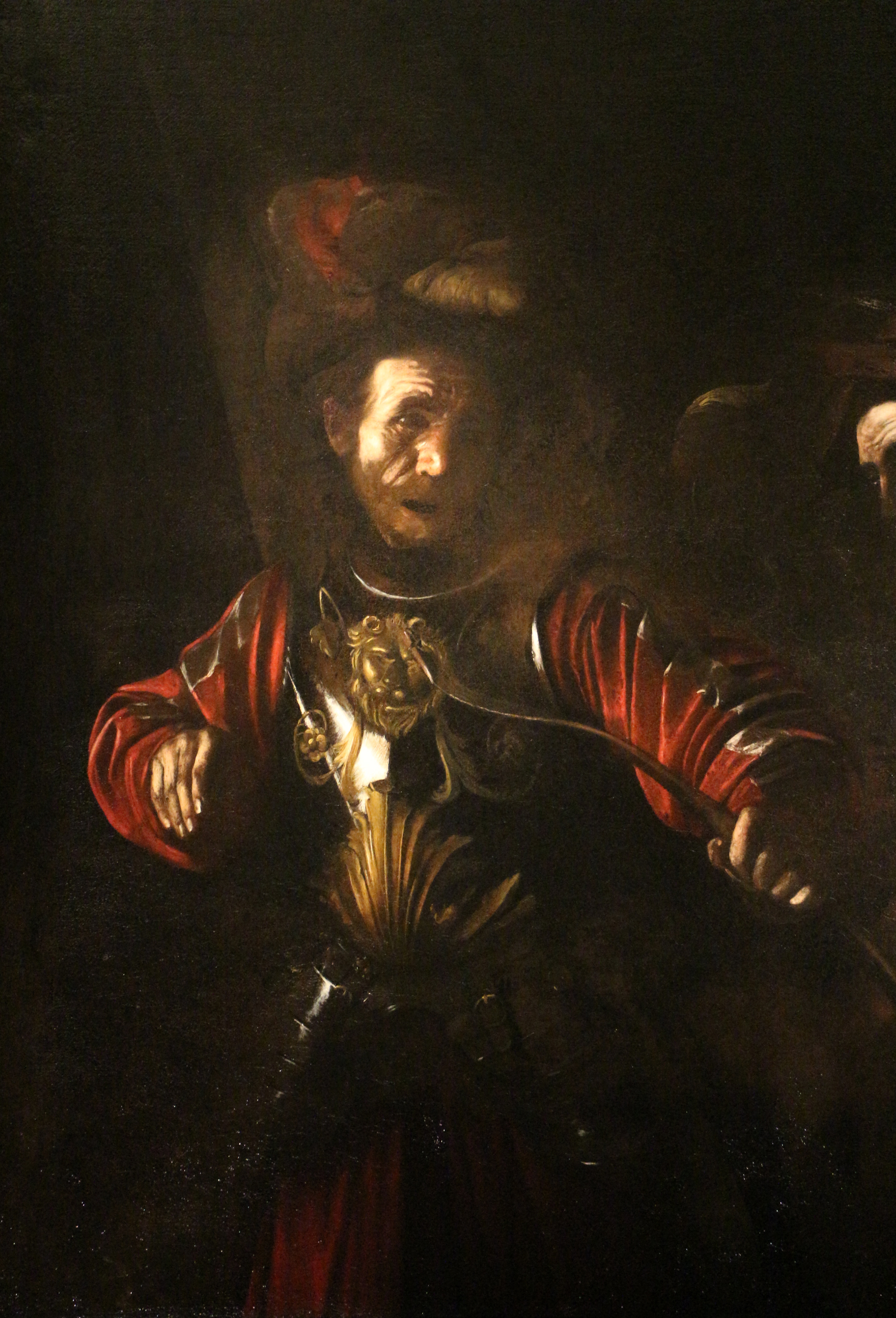
Detail of the Hun king in Caravaggio's The Martyrdom of Saint Ursula, 1610

Uldin, also spelled Huldin (died before 412), is the first Hunnic ruler whose historicity is undisputed.

== Etymology ==
The name is recorded as Ουλδης (Ouldes) by Sozomen, Uldin by Orosius, and Huldin by Marcellinus Comes. On the basis of the Latin variants, Omeljan Pritsak and Otto J. Maenchen-Helfen argue that the name ended on -n, not the Greek suffix -s. Hyun Jin Kim, however, argues that -in is a Greek suffix added to the name.

Maenchen-Helfen considers the name to be of Turkic origin. He compares it with the names Ultinzur and Uldach and argues that it is the element *uld or *ult plus a dimuninative suffix *-ïn. He does not give an etymology of the element *uld/*ult.

Pritsak derives the root of the etymon from the verb öl-, which survived in Mongolian olje, ol-jei (auspice, happiness, good luck). He argues that the middle suffix jei was originally *di + ge, thus *öl-jige > öl-dige. In place of Mongolian ge, Hunnic would then have the suffix n. He thus reconstructs the form is *öl-di-n (auspicious, happy, lucky, fortunate).

Hyun Jin Kim derives the name from the common Turkic word for six, *alti, comparing it to the Chuvash form ultta. He argues that the name was actually a title and may indicate that Uldin was one of the six principle nobles of the Huns rather than a king.

== History ==
In 400, Uldin ruled in Muntenia, present-day Romania, east of the Olt River. The extension of his realm to the north and east is unknown, but to the west probably reached the banks of Danube where Huns had been camped since 378-380. When Gainas, former magister militum praesentalis, with his Gothic followers fled across the borders to "his native land", Uldin "did not think it safe to allow a barbarian with an army of his own to take up dwellings across the Danube", and attacked him. Uldin was victorious, killed Gainas and sent his head to the Emperor Arcadius in Constantinople.

Late in the fall of 404 and in 405, according to Sozomen:

About this time the dissensions by which the church was agitated were accompanied, as is frequently the case, by disturbances and commotions in the state. The Huns crossed Ister and devastated Thrace. The robbers in Isauria, gathered in great strength, ravaged the towns and villages between Caria and Phoenicia.

This implies that Uldin's Huns raided eastern Roman territory before 405. According to Olympiodorus, Alarik's Goths guarded Illyricum for the west during Uldin’s raids on nearby eastern Roman provinces. Eventually Uldin became an ally of Stilicho, but only after being paid.

In 406, Uldin and Sarus the Goth were called by Roman magister militum Stilicho to help defeat the invasion of Italy by the Goths led by king Radagaisus. Orosius numbered 200,000 Goths. At the Battle of Faesulae (406), Hunnic auxiliaries encircled a significant part of Goths, and Radagaisus tried to escape, but was captured and executed in April 406 AD. It is considered that Goths of Radagaisus fled from the Hunnic lands, who themselves were pushed Westward by other nomadic tribes from the East.

In the summer of 408, the Huns learned that Stilicho would not push Alaric I's Visigoths into Illyricum, and that Roman troops in the East would be moved to the Persian frontier; accordingly, they entered the Balkans and Thrace. The Huns captured Castra Martis in Dacia Ripensis.

Otto J. Maenchen-Helfen thought that Jerome's description of unnamed, multiple tribes who invaded the Roman Empire as feras gentes "whose face and language are terrifying, who display womanly and deeply cut faces, and who pierce the backs of bearded man as they flee" as referring to the Huns.

Sozomen recounts that Uldin replied to a Roman commander who proposed a peace by "pointing to the rising sun and declaring that it would be easy for him, if he so desired, to subjugate every region of the earth enlightened by that luminary". While Uldin sought a large tribute in exchange to not wage war, his oikeioi and lochagos reflected a Roman form of government, philanthropic impulses, and readiness in rewarding the best men.

A sufficiently large number of Huns joined the Roman camps, and Uldin, suffering significant casualties and the loss of the whole tribe called Sciri (mostly foot soldiers), was forced to re-cross the Danube by March 23, 409. In the summer or fall of 409, military forces of Dalmatia, Pannonia Prima, Noricum and Raetia were entrusted by Honorius to pagan Generidus to repulse Hunnic raids.

Uldin's royal power gradually weakened in his last years. Between 408 and 410, the Huns were largely inactive. As allies of the Western Roman Empire, they did not attack the Visigoths of Alaric I in Pannonia Secunda and Pannonia Savia because they fought under Uldin in Illyricum and Thrace. Some Hun garrisons were in the Roman army led by Stilicho, and in Ravenna. In the summer of 409, a Hunnic army numbering 10,000 men was called into assistance by Honorius, but did not stop Alaric I from sacking Rome. Zosimus records that in late 409 some groups of Huns joined the Visigoths from Pannonia Prima who rode to Italy.

Around 410, the future Roman General Aetius, who was then a young man, was sent to the court of Uldin, where he remained with the Huns throughout much of the reign of Charaton, Uldin's successor. His presence as a hostage was probably used as a guaranty for the Hunnic forces which has been sent against Alaric in 410. According to some early historians, Aetius's upbringing amongst militaristic peoples gave him a martial vigour not common in Roman generals of the time.

In the same time period the alliance between the Huns and the Alans broke down. In 394, only the Transdanubian Alans led by Saul joined emperor Theodosius I, in 398 served Stilicho, and were still under Saul in 402. The Alans are not mentioned as allies of the Huns after 406, and most of them together with the Vandals crossed the Rhine in late 406 and went to Gaul, Spain and Africa. This could be explained by Orosius who recounts in 402 "I say nothing of the many internecine conflicts between the barbarians themselves, when two cunei of the Goths, and then the Alans and Huns, destroyed one another in mutual slaughter". The Hunnic noblemen have either Turkic or Germanized names, and very few Alanic names. Some Alans likely remained, but played a minor role among Huns.

Preceded by Balamber	King of the Huns late 4th/early 5th century	Succeeded by Charaton
