= Serhii Bozhko =

Ukrainian soldier (1997–2022)

- Сергій Віталійович Божко
- Born: 16 August 1997; Hnidyntsi, Chernihiv Oblast, Ukraine
- Died: 22 May 2022 (aged 24) near the village of Luhanske, Bakhmut Raion, Donetsk Oblast
- Military career
- Allegiance: Ukraine
- Branch: Ukrainian Ground Forces
- Rank: Senior soldier
- Nickname: August
- Unit: 30th Mechanized Brigade
- Conflicts: Russo-Ukrainian War; Russian invasion of Ukraine †
- Awards: Order of the Gold Star (posthumously)

Serhii Bozhko (Ukrainian: Сергій Віталійович Божко; August 16, 1997, Hnidyntsi, Chernihiv Oblast — May 22, 2022, near the village of Luhanske, Bakhmut Raion, Donetsk Oblast) was a senior soldier of the Armed Forces of Ukraine, a participant in the Russian-Ukrainian war who died during the Russian invasion of Ukraine, Hero of Ukraine with the Order of the Golden Star (2023, posthumously).

== Biography ==
Serhii Bozhko was born on 16 August 1997 in the village of Hnidyntsi, Chernihiv region. After graduating from the secondary school in 2010, he studied to become a pastry chef at the Ladansky branch of the Pryluky Professional Lyceum for four years. Then he entered the National Academy of Internal Affairs, where he graduated in 2017 with a degree in law enforcement and a special rank of police lieutenant.

From May 2017, he worked as a district police officer at the Pryluky Police Department of the Main Directorate of the National Police in Chernihiv Oblast.

In July 2018, he enlisted for military service under a contract in the military unit A2802.

In January 2020, he was transferred to the military unit A0878, where he served as a reconnaissance sapper.

In June – November 2019, he took part in the implementation of measures to ensure national security and defence of Mariupol, Donetsk region.

In 2020, he enrolled in part-time study in journalism at the State Institution "Taras Shevchenko National University of Luhansk".

In August 2021, he signed a contract with the A0409 military unit and became an anti-tank operator. Six months before the full-scale invasion of Ukraine by Russia, he signed a contract with the 30th Mechanized Brigade. This was his second contract. He served as an operator of an anti-tank platoon named after Prince Kostiantyn Ostrozkyi. He had the call sign "August".

On May 22, 2022, Serhii Bozhko was fatally wounded during an enemy assault near Luhansk, Bakhmut district, Donetsk region.

He was buried on May 25, 2022, in the village Zhuravka, Pryluky district, Chernihiv region.

== Family ==
The deceased is survived by his father Vitalii and mother Iryna Prokopenko.

== Awards ==
- the title of "Hero of Ukraine" with the Order of the Golden Star (July 8, 2023, posthumously) – for personal courage and heroism in defending the state sovereignty and territorial integrity of Ukraine, selfless service to the Ukrainian people.
