= Ultzindur =

Ultzindur (fl. 460) was a Hun nobleman and a blood relative of Attila.

== History ==
He lived in the Danube region after Attila (that is, after the death of the Hunnic king and the collapse of his empire), along with Emnetzur, who was also a blood relative of Attila. They held "Oescus, Utum and Almus on the right bank of the Danube", in Dacia Ripensis.

== Etymology ==
His name, like Tuldich, Tuldila, has uld-, ult- as its first element.
