= Charaton =

Early king of the Huns

King of the Huns
- Reign: 412–c. 420
- Predecessor: Uldin
- Successor: Octar
- Born: 4th century
- Died: c. 420

Charaton (Olympiodorus of Thebes: Χαράτων) was one of the first kings of the Huns.

== Etymology ==
The name is found in Greek as Χαράτων (Kharatōn). Otto J. Maenchen-Helfen notes that the -ton element might be an artifact of the Greek transcription, and the name may actually have ended in -tom, -ton, -to, -ta, or -t.

Omeljan Pritsak, following an earlier suggestion by A. Vámbéry, derived the root Chara- from Altaic xara - qara, with the meaning of "black" and "great; northern". He derived the second part -ton from a Saka loanword into Turkic, thauna > *taun > tōn, "garment, clothing, mantel". Pritsak concluded that the name Qara-Ton (black clad; with black coat) was an intentionally cryptic term for horse, possibly related to Hunnic totemism.

Maenchen-Helfen noted that the above proposal is "phonetically sound", but questioned whether the word ton had been loaned into Turkic in the fifth century. He suggests that if Charaton did in fact mean "black coat", then it could have been the name of Charaton's clan or tribe rather than his personal name; he compares the Kyrgyz tribal name Bozton (Gray Coats).

F. Altheim suggested that the name is a title from *qara-tun, meaning "black people", with black referencing the direction north.

Maenchen-Helfen also suggests an Iranian etymology as a potential alternative, with chara- deriving from a word akin to Parthian hara, xara (dark), as in the Parthian name Charaspes. He further notes that the -ton element is also found in the Scythian name Sardonius and the Ossetian name Syrdon.

== History ==
In the end of 412 or beginning of 413, Charaton received the Roman ambassador Olympiodorus sent by Honorius. Olympiodorus travelled to Charaton's kingdom by sea, but does not record whether the sea in question was the Black Sea or the Adriatic Sea. As the History deals exclusively with the Western Roman Empire, it was probably the Adriatic, and Olympiodorus visited them somewhere in the Pannonian Basin. Olympiodorus recounts;

"Donatus and the Huns, and the skillfulness of their kings in shooting with the bow. The author relates that he himself was sent on a mission to them and Donatus, and gives a tragic account of his wanderings and perils by the sea. How Donatus, being deceived by an oath, was unlawfully put to death. How Charaton, the first of the kings, being incensed by the murder, was appeased by presents from the emperor."

Although some scholars such as E. A. Thompson and Hyun Jin Kim have read Donatus as being a previous ruler, others, such as Franz Altheim and Otto Maenchen-Helfen, reject this assumption. Maenchen-Helfen argues that the name Donatus was common in the Roman Empire and that Donatus may have been a Roman who fled the empire to live with the Huns, as others are known to have done.

== Sources ==
- Kim, Hyun Jin (2013). The Huns, Rome and the Birth of Europe. Cambridge University Press. ISBN 9781107009066.
- Maenchen-Helfen, Otto J. (1973). The World of the Huns: Studies in Their History and Culture. University of California Press. ISBN 9780520015968.
- Pritsak, Omeljan (1982). "The Hunnic Language of the Attila Clan" (PDF). Harvard Ukrainian Studies. IV (4). Cambridge, Massachusetts: Harvard Ukrainian Research Institute. ISSN 0363-5570. Archived from the original (PDF) on 2016-12-13.
- Thompson, E. A. (1996). Heather, Peter (ed.). The Huns. Blackwell Publishers. ISBN 978-0-631-15899-8.

Preceded by Uldin	King of the Huns; 412	Succeeded by Joint rule of Octar and Rugila
