= Donatus (Huns) =

Hunnic king

Donatus was a man living among the Huns in the Danube region in the early 5th century. Though some modern historians consider him a Hunnic king, no sources call him either a Hun or a king.

Very little is known about Donatus. In the sources, it is mentioned that an embassy (around 413) by the Eastern Romans was sent to him, in which the historian Olympiodorus of Thebes also took part, whose report has only been preserved in fragments. According to this, Donatus was deceived by an oath and then murdered. Charaton, a king (or leader) of the Huns, was extremely angered by the assassination of Donatus and could only be appeased by the Romans with gifts.

It is not clear from the sources who Donatus was and what exact political role he played. Otto Mänchen-Helfen considered him a Roman who defected to the Huns. It is likely that he was murdered by the embassy in which also Olympiodorus took part in a very 'modern' pattern: "a government dispatches its agents to dispose of a possibly inconvenient émigré who had taken refuge in a foreign country."

The fact that Charaton was displeased with his death indicates he was esteemed by the Hun king; the fact Charaton didn't overreact shows the action was considered Roman business.

Sinor fancied he might have been a Donatist seeking refuge among the Huns.

His name was very likely of Roman, Latin origin. The name Donatus was popular among the Romans at the time.
