= Atakam =

Hun prince

- Prince of the Huns
- Born: Pannonia, Hunnic Empire
- Died: Carsum, Thrace
- Cause of death: Impalement

Atakam was a young Hun prince who was impaled by Attila.

== History ==
He was a young member of the royal house and a fugitive who deflected to the Romans. After the Huns and the Romans concluded a treaty whereby "all the Scythian (i.e., Hunnic) fugitives must be returned", he and fellow Hun royal family member Mamas were handed over to the Huns and impaled. He was impaled near Carsum, in Thrace.

Priscus uses a Greek word meaning "suspension" for the method of execution, which can also be read as "crucifixion". Peter Heather, who reads the word as "impaling", further noted that "Impaling seems to have been the main method of dealing with most problems in the Hunnic world."
