= War of Radagaisus =

405–06 Roman victory over the Goths

- Part of the Roman–Germanic Wars
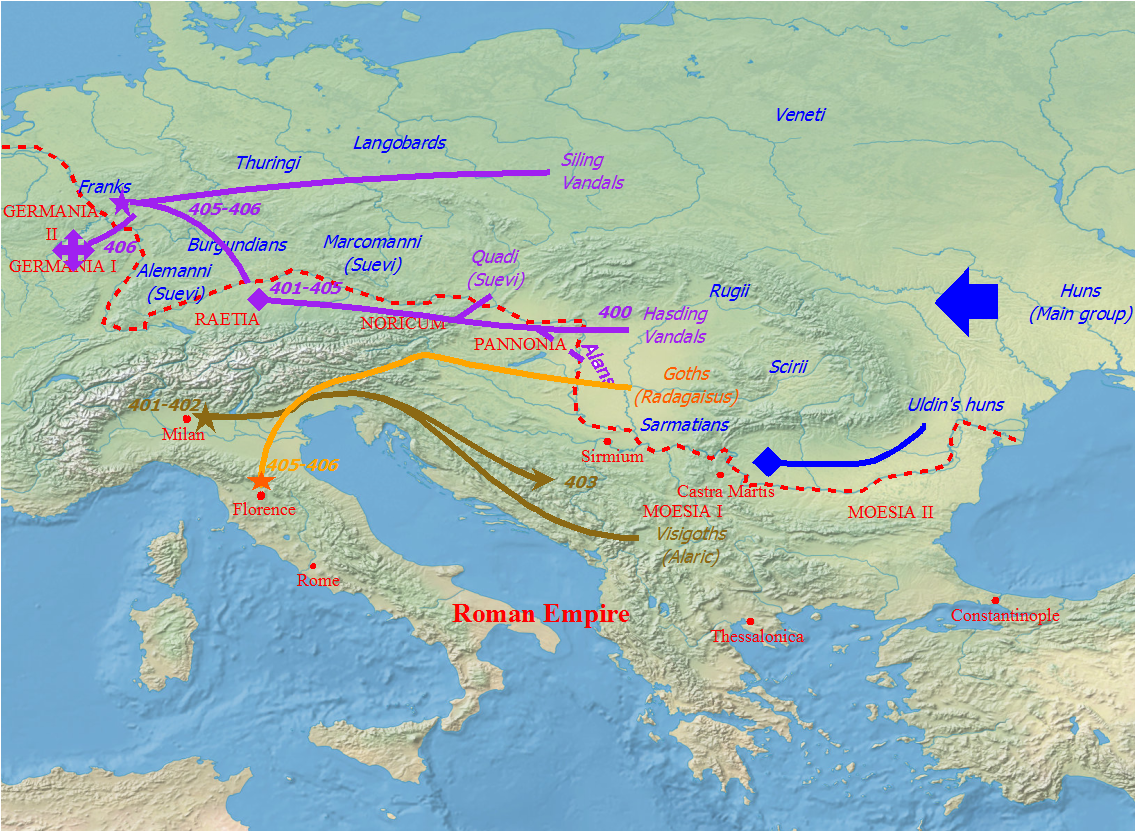
- Barbarian raids
| Date | 405–406 |
| Location | Panonnia, Italia |
| Result | Roman victory |

Belligerents
| Western Roman Empire; Goths; Huns | Goths; Vandals; Alans |

Commanders and leaders
| Stilicho; Sarus; Uldin | Radagaisus (executed); Sarus |

Strength
| 20.000 | 15.000-20.000 |

The War of Radagaisus was a military conflict in northern Italy in the period 405–406. It commenced when Radagaisus led a huge invasion force into the Western Roman Empire, which had recently ended a war with the Visigoths. Due to the size of Radagaisus' army, it required a tremendous effort by the Romans to avert this danger. Commander-in-chief Stilicho was closely involved in the preparations that were made and personally directed the army's operations.

== Background ==
At the end of the fourth century, the Huns, a nomadic people from Central Asia, arrived in Europe. From 395, when they stayed north of the Black Sea, they attacked the Eastern Roman Empire in waves, where they caused enormous destruction. Their arrival disrupted the populations already established in the region. Out of fear, various peoples left their habitats and chased other peoples. This movement is probably the origin of the migration of the Goths, who had bad experiences with the Huns led by Uldin). Radagaisus was a Gothic monarch who led his people from the Great Hungarian Plain to Italy. Despite what Zosimus says about this, most other sources describe Radagaisus' followers as Goths, and specify that he was their king. A group of Alans and Vandals marched together with the Goths.

Another explanation for Radagaisus' arrival is that the Western government's neglect of the threat posed by the gathered peoples on its borders caused a crisis that led Radagaisus to invade the empire in the hope of gaining new land and concessions from the government obtain.

== The raid of Radagaisus ==
When Radagaisus appeared at the border of the Western Roman Empire in 405, he had a large crowd with him. According to Zosimus, Radagaisus' people consisted of 400,000 people, Orosius mentions a number of 200,000. Modern historians suggest that his force probably numbered about 20,000 warriors. These warriors were accompanied by their families, meaning the total size of Radagaisus' group may have approached 100,000. They crossed the Danube River and followed a route through western Pannonia to the northern Alpine provinces and descended to Italy via the Brenner Pass. This is supported by archaeological finds of coin jars, buried by residents who apparently knew of Radagaisus' arrival. Around this time, Flavia Solva was burned and largely abandoned and Aguntum was destroyed by fire. An unspecified number of refugees fled before his army as it marched across the Alps.

Radagaisus encountered no significant resistance from the Roman army along the way. The imperial court had recently moved to Ravenna, where Stilicho had stationed the bulk of his Palatini field armies nearby, not only to guarantee the court's protection but also to oversee the western Illyrian provinces where Alaric stayed after his withdrawal from the war of 402. Moreover, the passages through the Alps were not or hardly defended, because the Alpine garrisons had been stripped by previous wars, and the mountain range was never fully manned after 395.

== Strength and army building of Stilicho ==
The army of Radagaisus was of such a size that Stilicho did not dare to attack it with his field army. Radagaisus' army ravaged Italy from the Alps to Tuscany for more than half a year before Stilicho amassed a force large enough to deal with the barbarian invaders. The fact that some towns were taken by storm, although unspecified but most likely all walled, was ominous enough in itself.

Since the empire was separated into an eastern and western part, Stilicho lacked sufficient resources and manpower. He brought a total of thirty Numerus of the Roman army into position. Together with auxiliary troops from the Alans and Huns, he managed to create a force of between 15,000 and 20,000 men, but possibly even smaller. Given the magnitude of the danger, it is reasonable to assume that he also mobilized troops stationed in Gaul, as he had done earlier during Alaric's invasion of Italy. However, the deployment of this army was continually postponed, because in April 406, soldiers were still recruited and even slaves were recruited into the army on the promise of freedom and a reward of two solidi. Eventually, Uldin's Hunnish auxiliaries arrived in Italy, strengthening Stilicho's army.

== Stilicho's counterattack ==
In August, Stilicho finally dared to challenge Radagaisus in the field when an excellent opportunity presented itself. Radagaisus had divided his army into three, under different leaders. Unlike the Imperial Army, he did not have the logistics to feed such a huge following in enemy territory, the elements of his army had to forage for themselves.

=== Incorporation of Sarus group ===
Stilicho managed to make contact with one of those groups and persuade them to defect. That group was led by the Goth Sarus. In exchange for a ransom, he and his warriors defected to the Roman side. Peter Heather suggests that behind Stilicho's acquisition of 12,000 of Radagaisus' best warriors "was a significant diplomatic coup, which drastically reduced Radagaisus' army and thus his chances of defeating Stilicho."

=== Destruction of the Alans and Vandals by the Huns ===
According to Heather, the third group consisted of the Alans and Vandals who had joined Radagaisus at the start of the raid. When Uldin's auxiliary troops arrive, their first task is to attack this group, with which Stilicho kept his Roman troops in reserve before allowing them to participate in the battle. About the groups of Alans and Vandals we are briefly informed by Orosius who mentions a massacre of the Alans by the Huns. Orosius' description is confirmed by Zosimus as well as by the Gallic Chronicler of 452. This event concerns a description of Stilicho's Huns slaughtering the third group of Radagaisus' army. Stilicho could not prioritize tracking down fleeing bands because he had to quickly march further south to subdue Sarus' host and defeat Radagaisus' main force.

The most plausible reconstruction is that the fleeing barbarians were actually a remnant of Radagaisus' third force, composed mainly of Vandals and Alans, who fled from northern Italy to Raetia across the Alps.

=== Battle of Fiesole ===
From Pavia, Stilicho's main force marches against Radagaisus, who is near the city of Florence, which is besieged by his Gothic army. In the hills of the Apennines near Fiesole, Stilicho's army meets Uldin's army and Sarus' Gothic army. Together they move on to Florence. Stilicho's army is now many times larger than Radagaisus's and manages to encircle the enemy army. The Romans avoided direct confrontation as much as possible and kept the encirclement closed. Famine soon breaks out among the besieged. The barbarians repeatedly make attempts to break out, always without success and when fighting takes place it is the Goths of Sarus' defected army who are deployed by Stilicho against Radagaisus' forces. According to Orosius, Sarus played a leading role in the battle. Ultimately, Radagaisus sees the hopelessness of his situation and surrenders. He capitulated on August 23. Although he has been promised fair terms, possibly concluding an alliance with the Romans, Stilicho immediately has him beheaded.

== Aftermath ==
The victory over Radagaisus is welcomed with great joy in Rome. In Stilicho's honor, a triumphal arch and monument are erected in the Forum to celebrate the victory and "Stilicho's exceptional love for the Roman people".

The victory in Florence can be regarded as the counterexample to the Roman defeat at Adrianople (378). It shows what the late Roman army was still capable of. Through good logistics, strategy and deft diplomacy, it managed to defeat a numerically superior opponent composed of different ethnicities. Stilicho achieved the greatest victory of his career with his victory in the War of Radagaisus.

The victory also had a downside. In order to defeat Radagaisus, Stilico had to clear part of the Rhine borders of his troops. At the end of December 405 or 406 AD there was a very severe winter, which caused the water in the Rhine to freeze over and a large contingent of Vandals, Alans and Suevi to cross and invade the provinces of Gaul (Rhine crossing). This invasion led to the army in Britannia revolting and crossing over to the continent under usurper Constantine III, after which the provinces of Gaul and Spain fell out of Emperor Honorius' power. Stilicho was accused by several of his competitors at the imperial court of inciting the Vandals, Alans, and Suevi to invade Gaul in order to take advantage of the weakening of the empire and claim the throne for himself. These allegations ultimately lead to Stilicho's downfall in 408.

== Sources ==
=== Primary sources ===
- Orosius
- Zosimus, Greek history writer, "Historia Nova"
- Prosper
- Marcellinus
- Chronica Gallica of 452

=== Secondary sources ===
- Birley, Anthony R. (2005). The Roman Government of Britain. Oxford University Press. ISBN 0-19-925237-8.
- Burns, Thomas S (1994). Barbarians within the Gates of Rome: A Study of Roman Military Policy and the Barbarians, CA. 375–425 A.D. Bloomington and Indianapolis: Indiana University Press.
- Bury, J. B. (1889). A History of the Later Roman Empire van Arcadius tot Irene. Vol. I.
- Drinkwater, John F. (1998). "The usurpers Constantine III (407–411) and Jovinus (411–413)". Britannia. 29.
- Heather, Peter (2005). The Fall of the Roman Empire. Oxford, United Kingdom: Oxford University Press. ISBN 978-0-19-515954-7.
- Jones, Arnold Hugh Martin; Martindale, John Robert; Morris, John (1964). The Prosopography of the Later Roman Empire. Vol. II. Cambridge University Press. ISBN 0-521-20159-4.
- Wijnendaele, Jeroen W. P. (2016). "Stilicho, Radagaisus, and the So-Called "Battle of Faesulae" (406 CE)". Journal of Late Antiquity. 9 (1). Johns Hopkins University Press: 267–284.
- Wolfram, Herwig (1988) [1979]. "Radagaisus and his contribution to the Visigothic ethnogenesis". History of the Goths. p. 168f.
