= Stanisław Rospond =

Polish linguist

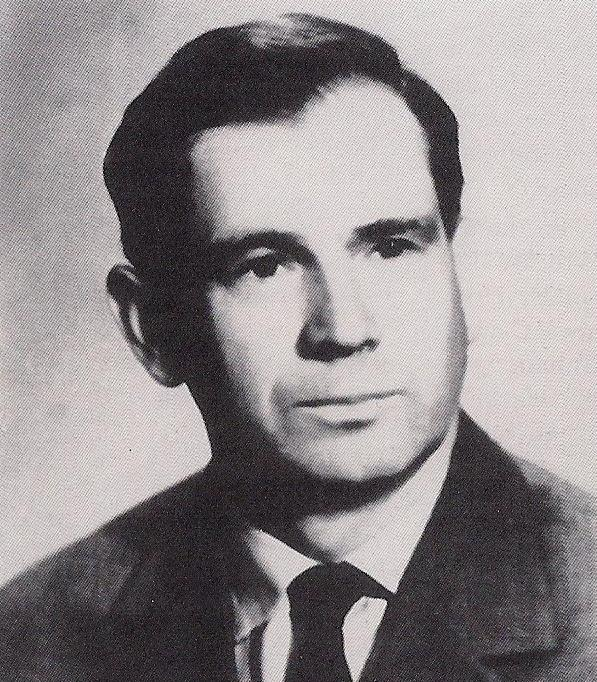
prof. Stanisław Rospond

Stanisław Rospond (December 19, 1906 – October 16, 1982) was a Polish linguist, and professor at the University of Wroclaw.
