= Mamas (Hun prince) =

Hun prince

- Prince of the Huns
- Born: Pannonia, Hunnic Empire
- Died: Carsum, Thrace
- Cause of death: Impalement

Mamas was a Hun royal family member who was impaled by Attila in Thrace.

He was a young Hunnic prince who defected to the Romans. After the Huns and the Romans made a treaty which provided that all fugitives to the Romans be returned to the Huns, he and another Hun prince, Atakam, were handed over to the Huns in Carsum, Thrace, and impaled there.

It is possible that he was baptized.
