= Balamber =

Hun chieftain

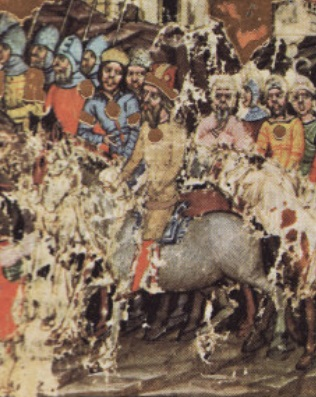
- Detail of the Hun king from the Huns entering Pannonia in 373 AD miniature in the Chronicon Pictum

King of the Huns
- Reign: 370s
- Successor: Uldin
- Born: c. 313
- Died: c. 378 (aged 64–65)
- Spouse: Vadamerca
- Issue: Uldin (?)

Balamber (also known as Balamir, Balamur and many other variants) was ostensibly a chieftain of the Huns, mentioned by Jordanes in his Getica (c. 550 AD). Jordanes simply called him "king of the Huns" (Latin: rex Hunnorum) and writes the story of Balamber crushing the tribes of the Ostrogoths in the 370s; somewhere between 370 and more probably 376 AD.

A number of historians argue that Balamber may have never existed, and was a confusion of other rulers or even a fabrication.

== Etymology ==
The name is recorded in three variants by Jordanes, and an additional two by copyists: Balaber, Balamber, Balamur, Balambyr, Balamir. Balaber, with omission of -m-, may be a corruption of Balamber. Balamir has the Gothic onomastic suffix -mir/-mer.

Otto J. Maenchen-Helfen argued that the original form of the name was Balimber and that its meaning is unknown.

Omeljan Pritsak considered Balamur as the only original Hunnic form of the name. He derived it from a word akin to Mongolian balamut, balamud, balamad (savage, wild, venturous, daring). Pristak thus reconstructs the name as coming from bala + mur, meaning "the greatest among the venturous, daring".

Hyun Jin Kim argues that the name is simply a corruption of the name Valamir, who he argues to have been the basis of the figure in Jordanes. Kim notes that Valamir was written Βαλαμηρ (Balamêr) in Greek. He argues that the name is of uncertain meaning but "seems to have an eastern origin" and suggests a connection to a city in Central Asia called Balaam (Βαλαάμ).

== History ==
Jordanes recounts:

"Balamber, king of the Huns, took advantage of his ill health to move an army into the country of the Ostrogoths, from whom the Visigoths had already separated because of some dispute. Meanwhile Hermanaric, who was unable to endure either the pain of his wound or the inroads of the Huns, died full of days at the great age of one hundred and ten years. The fact of his death enabled the Huns to prevail over those Goths who, as we have said, dwelt in the East and were called Ostrogoths."

"When he had ruled with such license for barely a year, Balamber, king of the Huns, would no longer endure it, but sent for Gesimund, son of Hunimund the Great. Now Gesimund, together with a great part of the Goths, remained under the rule of the Huns, being mindful of his oath of fidelity. Balamber renewed his alliance with him and led his army up against Vinitharius. After a long contest, Vinitharius prevailed in the first and in the second conflict, nor can any say how great a slaughter he made of the army of the Huns. But in the third battle, when they met each other unexpectedly at the river named Erac, Balamber shot an arrow and wounded Vinitharius in the head, so that he died. Then Balamber took to himself in marriage Vadamerca, the grand-daughter of Vinitharius, and finally ruled all the people of the Goths as his peaceful subjects, but in such a way that one ruler of their own number always held the power over the Gothic race, though subject to the Huns."

Those events were preceded by the Huns' attack on the Alans at the Don River, who bordered the Greuthungi, and according to Ammianus Marcellinus, occurred an alliance between them.

The events and names which followed vary according to Ammianus and Cassiodorus (from whose Gothic History was summarized Getica):

Ammianus wrote that after death of Ermanaric in 375, Vithimiris became the king of the Greuthungi, he resisted the Huns and Alans, but was killed in battle and was succeeded by young son Videric, so they were ruled by duces Alatheus and Safrax. They managed to make a confederation of Greuthungi, Alans and Huns, who escaped from the majority of Huns, crossed the Danube in 376, and fought Battle of Adrianople in 378.

Cassiodorus, i.e. Jordanes recounts that after Ermanaric's death Goths separated in Western Visigoths and Eastern Ostrogoths, the latter remained in "their old Scythian settlements" under Hunnic rule. The Amal Vinitharius retained the "insignia of his princely rank", and trying to escape from the Huns, he invaded the lands of the Antes and their king Boz for merely one year, but Balamber put an end to Ostrogoths independence. After the subjection, followed more complex Ostrogoths royal descending; Ermanaric > Hunimund-Thorismund-Berimud moved with his son Videric with the Visigoths to the West because "despised the Ostrogoths for their subjection to the Huns". Then happened forty years of interregnum and Ostrogoths decided to give the rule to Vandalaris's son Valamir, a relative of Thorismund. Valamir eventually deserted Attila's sons in c. 454.

Herwig Wolfram argued the possibility that unknown river Erac could be identified with the river Phasis in Lazica. Otto J. Maenchen-Helfen denied the connection with ancient Erax, and considered Tiligul or lower Dnieper. Wolfram puts the geographical location of events after the battle in 376, in Scythia, but the term shifted more westward and actually meant Dacia and Pannonia.

Maenchen-Helfen considered that Cassiodorus would not admit that the Gothic princess Vadamerca became a wife of Balamber if he was not some sort of a king.

Wolfram argued that although scholars often identify "Vithimiris" with Vinitharius, and "Videric" with Vandalarius, onomatological and genealogical methods do not go along with historical events, and many difficulties arise. One of them was that Balamber lived in the time of Valamir. However, although of similar etymological names, Balamber, Wolfram related to Iranian Balimber, and as such considered them two different personalities.

A number of scholars such as Edward Arthur Thompson, Hyun-Jin Kim, and Peter Heather consider Balamber's story historically improbable, and he may be a version of the better-attested Valamir, or was an invention by the Goths to explain who defeated them.

== Sources ==
- Heather, Peter (2007). The Fall of the Roman Empire: A New History of Rome and the Barbarians. Oxford University Press. ISBN 9780195325416.
- Heather, Peter (2010). Empires and Barbarians: The Fall of Rome and the Birth of Europe. Oxford University Press. ISBN 9780199752720.
- Jordanes (1908). The Origin and Deeds of the Goths. Translated by Mierow, Charles Christopher. Princeton: Princeton University – via Project Gutenberg.
- Kim, Hyun Jin (2013). The Huns, Rome and the Birth of Europe. Cambridge University Press. ISBN 9781107009066.
- Maenchen-Helfen, Otto J. (1973). The World of the Huns: Studies in Their History and Culture. University of California Press. ISBN 9780520015968.
- Pritsak, Omeljan (1982). "The Hunnic Language of the Attila Clan" (PDF). Harvard Ukrainian Studies. IV (4). Cambridge, Massachusetts: Harvard Ukrainian Research Institute. ISSN 0363-5570. Archived from the original (PDF) on 13 December 2016.
- Sinor, Denis (1990). The Cambridge History of Early Inner Asia. Cambridge University Press. ISBN 9780521243049.
- Thompson, E. A. (1996). Heather, Peter (ed.). The Huns. Blackwell Publishers. ISBN 978-0-631-15899-8.
- Wolfram, Herwig (1990). History of the Goths. Translated by Dunlap, Thomas J. University of California Press. ISBN 9780520069831.

Preceded by Unknown	King of the Huns; 370s	Succeeded by Uldin
