= Uldach =

General of the Byzantine Empire

Uldach (fl. 550) was a general of the Byzantine Empire of Hunnish descent.

He was a general in the Byzantine army around 550 AD. He fought alongside Roman commander Artabanes against the Franks in Pisaurum. They saw them advancing along the Ionian coast, slipped down from the city and attacked them, killing them in great number.

His name might have been of Turkic origin.
