= Radagaisus =

Gothic king (died 406)

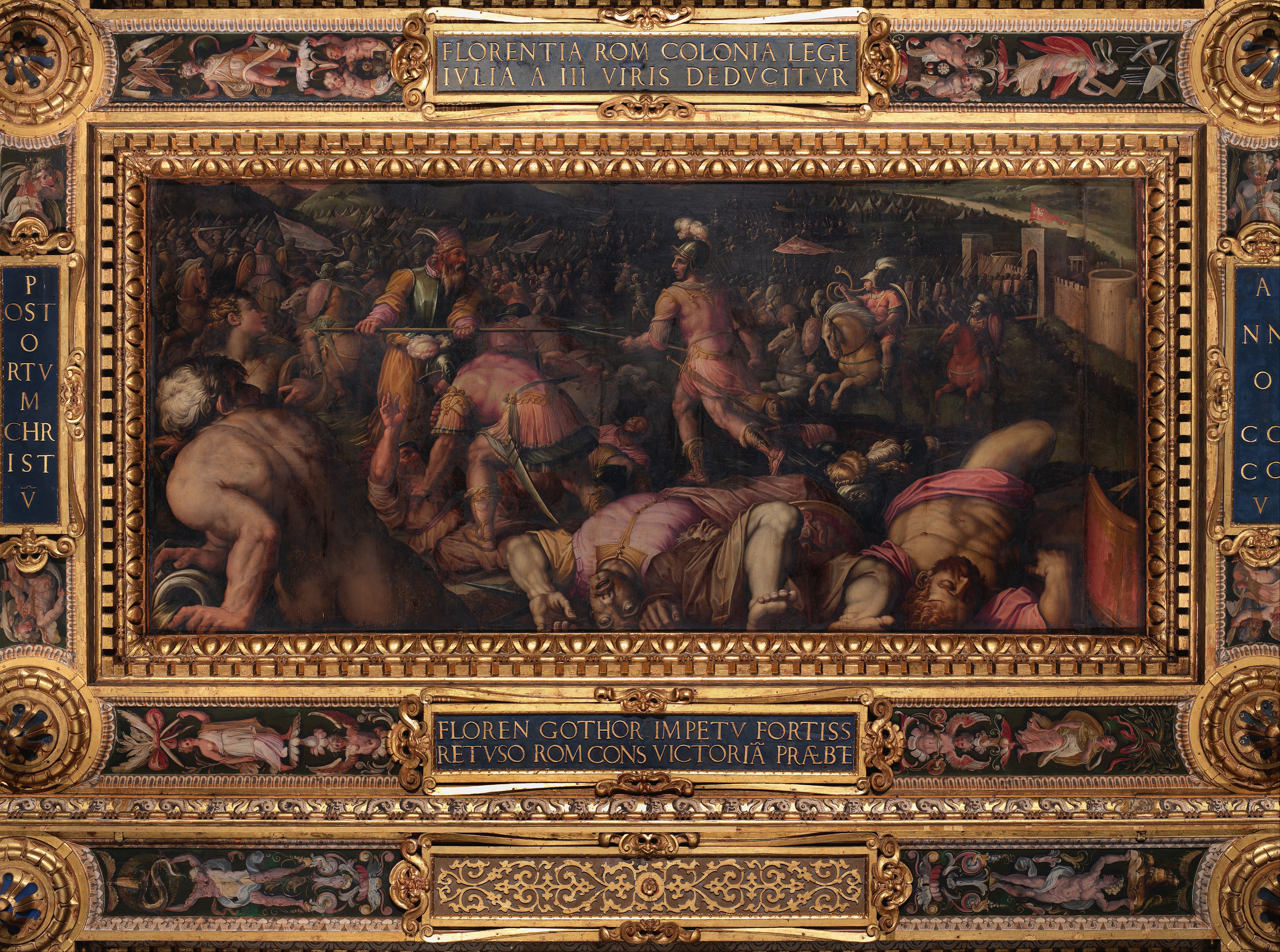
Giorgio Vasari, Defeat of Radagaiso below Fiesole, 1563–1565

Radagaisus (died 23 August 406) was a Gothic king who led an invasion of Roman Italy in late 405 and the first half of 406. A committed pagan, he was executed after being defeated by the general Stilicho.

== Invasion ==
Radagaisus's force probably consisted of about 20,000 fighting men. Many of the fighters were accompanied by their families and other noncombatants, meaning that the total size of Radagaisus's group may have approached 100,000.

Radagaisus, whose early career and ultimate origins are unknown, fleeing Hunnic pressures, invaded Italy without passing through the Balkans, which indicates that his invasion began somewhere on the Great Hungarian Plain, west of the Carpathian Mountains. Archaeological finds of coin hoards, buried by residents who were apparently aware of Radagaisus's approach, suggest that his route passed through southeastern Noricum and western Pannonia. About this time Flavia Solva was burned out and largely abandoned and Aguntum was devastated by fire. An indeterminate number of refugees fled ahead of his army as it marched over the Alps. It was said by contemporaries that Arian Christians swelled his forces.

The Western Roman Empire under Stilicho mobilized thirty numeri (about 15,000 men) from the Italian field army in response to Radagaisus's invasion. A second contingent of Roman troops, possibly recalled from the Rhine frontier, complemented the Italian forces. In addition, they received help from Gothic foederati under Sarus and Hunnic forces under Uldin. Alaric I remained inactive through the whole episode, committed by treaty to Illyricum.

Radagaisus's army had the run of northern Italy for at least six months while the Empire mobilized its forces. They eventually made their way to the bridgehead community of Florentia. They blockaded the city, where no less than a third of the Goth's troops and allies were killed.

== Capture, death, and aftermath ==
Stilicho's army relieved the siege of Florentia as the city was approaching the point of surrender. The Roman counterattack was extremely successful, and Radagaisus was forced to retreat into the hills of Fiesole, about 8 km away. There, Radagaisus abandoned his followers and tried to escape, but was captured by the Romans. Historian Peter Heather hypothesizes that Radagaisus's escape attempt may have been compelled by a revolt within his forces. He was executed on 23 August 406. 12,000 of his higher-status fighters were drafted into the Roman army. Some of the remaining followers were dispersed, while so many of the others were sold into slavery that the slave market briefly collapsed. These Goths later joined Alaric I in his sack of Rome in 410.

== Ancient sources ==
- History of Orosius
- History of Zosimus
- Chronicle of Prosper of Aquitaine
- Chronicle of Marcellinus Comes
- Augustine of Hippo, City of God, Book 5, Chapter 23

== Other accounts ==
- Edward Gibbon in the History of the Decline and Fall of the Roman Empire (1776), Chapter 30

== See also ==
- Gainas
- Arbogast
- Odoacer
- War of Radagaisus
