= Eskam =

Eskam (fl. 448-449 AD) was a Hun living in 5th-century Pannonia, then under the Hunnic Empire. He was possibly a shaman. His daughter was one of the numerous wives of Attila the Hun.

== Etymology ==
Otto Maenchen-Helfen derived his name from Turkic as, meaning "friend, companion", and qam, meaning "shaman." Omeljan Pritsak instead derived the first element from Hunnic es/äs "great, old", while also deriving the second element from Altaic qām "sorcerer, pagan priest".

== Biography ==
Given Maenchen-Helfen's etymology, it is possible that Eskam was a Hunnic shaman. He and his daughter are mentioned by Priscus in his account of his visit to the court of Attila], around 448 AD. During their voyage with the Hun king towards his favorite town, the paths of Priscus' envoy and the Hunnic king's temporarily separated as the king was to pay a visit to Eskam and marry his daughter. During their trip to Attila's favorite town, his envoy joined the king himself and a company of Huns, who were heading in the same direction after hunting in Roman territory. They spent one day at Attila's encampment and then departed with him. However, at a certain point they were forced to continue along a different route, as Attila was proceeding to a village where he would marry the daughter of a certain Eskam.

The account of Priscus has survived only in fragments, and it is possible that this Eskam had already been mentioned in the now lost text. Priscus specifies that Attila would marry Eskam's daughter even though he had many other wives, since "the Scythians (i.e. Huns) practice polygamy".
