= Vinithar =

4th-century King of the Greuthingi (Goths)

Vinitharius or Vinithar was possibly a king of the Greuthungian Goths around 375-376 AD. Vinitharius is mentioned by Gothic historian Jordanes in Getica. According to him, Vinitharius became the new king of the Greuthungi after the death of Ermanaric (Hermanaric). Ammianus Marcellinus reports that Ermanaric was succeeded by Vithimiris.

At that time those Goths fell under suzerainty of Huns.

According to Jordanes, Vinitharius, unwilling to remain under the rule of the Huns, withdrew a little from them and led his forces against the country of the Antes, whose leader was Boz. Beaten in the first encounter, he then prevailed, and as a terrible example crucified Boz together with his sons and seventy nobles. After barely a year the Hun king Balamber marched against him together with Goths who had remained loyal to the Huns. Vinitharius won the first two battles but was killed by an arrow shot by Balamber in a third, at the river Erac, and Balamber married his granddaughter Vadamerca.

Florin Curta considers, and rejects, the possibility that the Boz episode came from Gothic oral tradition, as implied by Herwig Wolfram. He argues instead that Jordanes reworked the account of Ammianus Marcellinus, in which Ermanaric's successor Vithimiris fought the Alans, so that Vithimiris became Vinitharius and the Alans became the Antes.

== Sources ==
- Hermann Reichert: Vinithar. In: Reallexikon der Germanischen Altertumskunde (RGA). 2. Auflage. Band 32, Walter de Gruyter, Berlin / New York 2006, ISBN 3-11-018387-0, S. 430–431
- Arne Søby Christensen: Cassiodorus, Jordanes and the History of the Goths: Studies in a Migration Myth. Museum Tusculanum Press, Kopenhagen 2002, ISBN 8772897104, S. 140–156.
