= Olympiodorus of Thebes =

Egyptian historian

Olympiodorus of Thebes (Ancient Greek: Ὀλυμπιόδωρος ὁ Θηβαῖος; born c. 380, fl. c. 412–425 AD) was an Egyptian historian, poet, philosopher and diplomat of the early fifth century. He produced a History in twenty-two volumes, written in Greek, dedicated to the Emperor Theodosius II, detailing events in the Western Roman Empire between 407 and 425. The history is lost, but much of it is known from its use by other writers.

His friends included philosophers, provincial governors and rhetoricians. He made several journeys in an official capacity, accompanied for twenty years by a parrot. He was a "convinced but discreet" pagan, who flourished in a Christian court, and whose work influenced several subsequent historians, including writers of ecclesiastical history.

== Life ==
Olympiodorus was born between 365 and 380 in Thebes (modern Luxor, Egypt), in the Roman province of Thebaïd, into a curial family. Thebes at that point was a flourishing centre of literary learning, and a cradle of politicians and public figures. He received a classical education, learning Greek and Latin, as well as the vernacular Coptic. This education provided access to a career in public life. He went to study philosophy at Athens around 385–90, at about fifteen, and would have stayed there for four years. It was probably at Athens that he made friends with the sophist Leontius and the grammarian Philtatius, whose knowledge of the amount of glue to use in book-binding caused a statue of him to be erected at Athens. Another friend, Valerius, was governor of Thrace in 421, and may have been the son of Leontius and brother of the future Augusta Eudocia. (Note: In 421, Athenaïs, the daughter of Leontius had converted to Christianity, taking the name Eudocia, and married the emperor Theodosius II.)

After his studies, he seems to have returned to Thebes, where there was a thriving community of poets writing in Greek, and embarked on the poetry that came to define him. At this time, according to Treadgold, he may have married and adopted a son, possibly an orphaned relative. Around 399/400 he acquired a pet parrot, his faithful companion for the next twenty years, which spoke beautiful Greek and could "dance, sing, call its owner's name, and do many other tricks". At some point he moved, with his family and parrot, to Constantinople, where he established himself at the court of Theodosius II, enabled by his classical education. (Latin was the language of official business, and proficiency in this language was necessary, even in the east, for any important government appointment.) He probably also benefitted from his connection with the future Empress. During his several journeys over the next thirteen years, he recorded a wide variety of facts, statistics, geographical observations, etymological musings, and opinions on the political situation in the west.

== Travels ==
His first recorded visit was on an embassy to the Huns in 412/3. Olympiodorus discourses about

"Donatus and the Huns, and the skilfulness of their kings in shooting with the bow. The author relates that he himself was sent on a mission to them and Donatus, and gives a tragic account of his wanderings and perils by the sea. How Donatus, being deceived by an oath, was unlawfully put to death. How Charaton, the first of the kings, being incensed by the murder, was appeased by presents from the emperor."

A school of thought says that he was sent by the Western Roman Emperor, but Treadgold finds this implausible, all the evidence pointing to Olympiodorus's living in, and working for, the eastern Empire during his professional life. During this journey, Olympiodorus learned sufficient Hunnish to include some technical terms in his writing. He also picked up a few words of Vandal, telling us that the Vandals called the Goths Truli, because, when pressed by famine, they bought a trula of wheat for a gold coin, though it was only one third of a pint.

Around 416, he went on a visit to Athens. There, through his "support and efforts" he caused his friend Leontius to be installed in the Chair of Rhetoric at the university (a position that Leontius apparently did not want). This was perhaps to settle a dispute between rival candidates, ensuring the choice of the Emperor. Or to support an official programme of copying classical texts following Visigothic invasions. He gives a vivid account of the student rituals in the city:

"All newcomers (novices), young and old, were taken to the public baths. Those who were by age fit to wear the cloak were brought forward by the scholastics who escorted them; then, while some ran in front pushed them back, others, running behind, pushed them forward and resisted them, amid shouts of 'Stop, stop, he must not wash.' Those who pushed back those who tried to hinder the progress of the novice were considered to be victorious in the contest. After a considerable time, and after a long disputation had taken place in accordance with custom, he who was being escorted was taken into a warm room and washed. Having dressed himself, he received permission to wear the cloak on his way from the bath, being accompanied by a numerous and distinguished throng."

In the same year (416), and probably as part of the same trip, he visited the oases of the Egyptian desert. His description of the journey ends with the assertion that Homer's family were natives of the Thebaïd. The official purpose of the visit may have been to gather information about the Blemmyes of Nubia, a group of barbarians living south of the Great Oasis and the Thebaïd, who frequently raided both.

In about 419/20, he undertook an actual mission to the Blemmyes, probably in his official capacity. He gives another account of a harrowing sea-voyage:

"While talking of a marvellous star (called Urania by the sailors), he was leaning heavily against the mast, which nearly gave way and precipitated him into the water."

His parrot seems to have perished, as his writing at this time contains what looks like an obituary. At the border town of Syene (now Aswan), a request was sent to the ethnarchs (leaders) of the Blemmyes, requesting permission to meet them. They referred the decision to their "prophets", who applied divination to the question, and decided in favour of allowing Olympiodorus into their territory: they "were eager to meet him owing to his reputation." He was urged to visit the emerald mines of the Pharaohs, but official permission was withheld. This is read as the local kings' refusal, in Freese's translation of Photius, but Treadgold thinks it much more likely that it was the Emperor's decision: Olympiodorus was commissioned to travel for five days and no further, and the emerald mines could obviously not be reached within this time. (As further evidence, Treadgold points out that Olympiodorus uses the word basileus (βασιλεύς), the proper title of the Roman Emperor, to refer to the withholder.) On his return journey, he stopped off at his native Thebes, where he learned of the death of his son. He continued his journey to Alexandria, where he met his friend Hierocles.

His final recorded journey was to Rome in 424/5, in the company of the magister officiorum Helion, for the installation of the six year old Valentinian III as Western Emperor, in place of the usurper Johannes (423–5). Though there is no direct evidence that Olympiodorus went on this trip, there are several compelling reasons to think he did: his detailed knowledge of affairs since 407; his observations on the coastline of Italy; the citing of facts and statistics that would have been available in the city archives at Rome; and his amazement at the actual grandeur of Rome and the wealth of its aristocracy. One hexameter, presumably his own, appears in the description of the residences of the wealthy on his visit to Rome, which contained hippodromes, fountains, shrines, and many of the other attributes of a town:

"One house is a town; a city has ten thousand towns" (Εΐς δόμος ά συ πέλει πόλις ά οτεα μυρία κεύθει)

== Writing ==
The history itself is now lost, but many of its structures and features can be established from the works of other writers. Its twenty-two books were organised into two decads. The first started with an account of Stilicho's career from 395, with the history proper beginning in 407, and ended (in Book X) with the voyage to the Huns in 412. The second decad began with events in Gaul that can be dated to the same year (412), and ended with the expedition to Rome for Valentinian's installation in 425.

The history dealt almost exclusively with the Western Empire, and provides much of what we know of its affairs in the early fifth century (particularly around 410 when Rome fell to the Visigoths). Events in the east are only introduced when they impacted on affairs in the West, or were relevant to Olympiodorus himself. He describes eastern affairs in western terms: Theodosius II is the "nephew of Honorius and Placidia" (the western Emperor and his sister), as well as the son of Arcadius (the eastern Emperor).

He provides detailed chronologies, using consular dating: the usurpation of Constantine III, in 406, is given as "before the seventh consulship of Honorius and the second of Theodosius", and the whole history covers the period from the seventh consulship of Honorius to the accession of Valentinian III. We are told that the marriage of Placidia and the Goth Ataulf occurred in the month of January, and her marriage to Constantius III was in the eleventh consulship of Honorius and the second of Constantius.

Though written in Greek, the work included many Latinisms, including inscriptions and acclamations in the Roman alphabet: e.g. the response to Stilicho's request to the Senate for the money to pay off Alaric I: non est ista pax, sed pactio servitutus ("This is not a peace, but a bond of servitude"). Or the cry of the starving population in the Circus Maximus, faced with a grain blockade from Africa, exploitation by the grain merchants, and the prospect of eating each other: pretium inpone carni humanæ ("Fix a certain price on human flesh"). Olympiodorus "jestingly" suggests that the name bucellarii (soldiers) derives from the buccellatum (dry bread, biscuit) which they ate.

He gave distances in Roman miles (μίλια), as well as stades: e.g. Ariminum (Rimini), "thirty miles from Ravenna".; or "two hundred and ten stadia distant from Ravenna". Olympiodorus transliterated every Roman title into Greek, an unusual practice: Greek historians avoided transliteration, often by leaving out the officials' titles altogether.

The history includes detailed accounts of people, e.g. his account of Constantius III:

"Constantius, as he rode along, had a dejected and sullen appearance, with his great eyes and neck and broad head; his whole body was bent over his horse and he looked askance on either side, in order as the old expression has it, "to appear worthy of empire." At feasts and banquets, however, he was agreeable and sociable, and often even condescended to vie with the mimes who performed at table."

The accuracy of personal details was often corroborated: Stilicho's nemesis, "the cruel and inhuman Olympius", is described as a pious Christian; this is confirmed by letters from Saint Augustine of Hippo. He narrates the motivations of various characters with clarity, showing how they manoeuvered through the volatile political landscape of the times. The history provided statistical and cultural details: e.g. the sizes of armies; "the emperor called ten thousand Huns to his assistance in the war against Alaric"; the buying-off of Alaric, in which the city agreed to "give five thousand pounds of gold, and thirty thousand of silver, four thousand silk robes, three thousand scarlet fleeces, and three thousand pounds of pepper"; the relative sizes of the baths (there were 1600 seats in the Antonine baths, and twice that number in the Baths of Diocletian). Olympiodorus was able to calculate the annual income of Roman senators, and the immense sums spent by them during their, and the families', public offices.

It also showed a predilection for gruesome details: "Olympius, who intrigued against Stilicho.. is beaten to death by order of Constantius, the husband of Placidia, after his ears have first been cut off"; the heads of usurpers (Jovinus and his brother Sebastian, Constantine and his son Julian, Maximus and Eugenius) are exposed outside Carthage; Attalus, city prefect of Rome, declared Emperor by Alaric "is captured, and, after the thumb and forefinger of his right hand have been cut off, is banished".

Above all, the work had a "distinctly geographical bias", with "even the geography of poets...pressed into... service". Events were often narrated topographically (a practice shared with Ammianus Marcellinus). In his account of his trip to the Blemmyes, there are digressions on the weather, wells, agriculture and fossils. Olympiodorus concluded, from the fossil remains, that the Great Oasis of Siwah had once been an island. He gives detailed accounts of the routes taken by Alaric and Stilicho on various campaigns, mentioning rivers, towns, distances and features of the landscape.

Though Olympiodorus was a Pagan, the work was "carefully neutral" on religious issues, (apart from some references to the disastrous effects of removing pagan statues). He was capable of even-handedness towards people, praising the Gothic general Sarus for his bravery and skill in battle, but denouncing him as an oath-breaker. Though emperors are generally mentioned with respect, he depicted Honorius as an oath-breaker (Honorius had promised safe passage to Constantine III and his son, but then had them executed), but praised his arrangement with the Visigoth Ataulf, whereby the latter defeated the rebel Jovinus in 413. Surprisingly, in the political context of the times, Olympiodorus spoke positively of Stilicho, and disapproved wholeheartedly of his execution by Honorius. He could also take unfavourable views of individuals: for instance, the pious Olympius, whom Olympiodorus regarded as a traitor, while other writes regarded him as a 'public benefactor'. He did not like Galla Placidia, telling us that her second husband, the emperor Constantius III, was "generous and open-handed" till he married her, after which he descended into "parsimonious ways". (Note: Baldwin & Baldwin opine that Olympiodorus’s disgust at Placidia's turning Constantius III to frugal ways makes it “hard to decide whether our historian sounds more like a confirmed bachelor or a hen-pecked husband.” They suggest that the description of Constantius III as a “boon companion in male company” may have reflected his own tastes.).

The work has been seen as a piece of travel-writing, in which the wandering poet goes in search of "themes, patrons and rewards"; however, Matthews points out that the style is more in keeping with an official document, designed to inform and make policy recommendations based on the situation in the west. Olympiodorus himself described the work as "a collection of materials for a history", (ὕλη συγγραφῆς), (Note: Freese's translation of Photius says that Olympiodorus referred to his work as a silva; Baldwin & & Baldwin note that is synonymous with hyle.)

Gillett tells us that holders of public office in antiquity often assembled such materials so that they, or others, could use them as the basis for a history. Thompson points out that Olympiodorus's idiosyncrasies of style: the Latinisms, slang (vernacular Greek), statistics and dating systems, which did not have to conform to the conventions of contemporary historical writing, were appropriate for such a work.

== Date of writing ==
Scholarly debate places this from soon after the last events described, in 425, to close to 450. Thompson is an advocate of an early date (427 at the latest), as Olympiodorus gives a favourable account of "the most noble" general Boniface, declared a public enemy in 427 by Placidia. However, in 432 Boniface was back in favour and was awarded the title Patrician, which makes possible a later date of publication.

433 is supported by the fact that Sozomen's HE breaks off at this point; it is also the accepted date of publication of Philosturgius's Ecclesiastical History, though this is disputed. Gillett opts for a later date, about 440; with a terminus ante quem of 450, when Theodosius II, its dedicatee, died. He reasons that the church historian Socrates, whose HE breaks off in 439, shows no signs of having used Olympiodorus, and that as Socrates read widely of the available literature, it is likely that Olympiodorus's work had not been published by then. Gillett also offers, as evidence of a date of publication of 450, the "common and prudent practice" among historians to refrain from writing about events in the reigns of living emperors. Another possibility is that the work was published in sections, with the first decad having been written any time after the marriage of Placidia and Constantius in 417 (as they are therein referred to as married). The work may have been written to deadline.

== Sources ==
Olympiodorus had access to a wide variety of sources and used many research techniques. He was widely read in prose and poetry. (Note: His knowledge of Homer was sufficient for him to identify the coast of Italy as the backdrop to Odysseus's adventures, rather than Sicily. (Photius tells us that this view was accepted by several scholars who came after him)) He was aware of Ammon, who had measured the walls of Rome in the early 5th century. He quoted Asinius Quadratus, citing him extensively on geographical matters. He mentions the poet Peisander, whom he credits with providing the connection between the Argonauts and the founding of Emona. Thompson suggests that Olympiodorus had read and digested Ammianus Marcellinus: the works of the two historians being similar in scale, and in their use of geographical and social detail. It is possible to see the influence of Thucydides and Plutarch in the history., and the poet Claudian has been suggested as a source. A source with which Olympiodorus would have been familiar was the History to Continue Dexippus of Eunapius, which ended in 404 and dealt primarily with the eastern empire. Treadgold suggests that "to some extent", Olympiodorus could be seen as a continuator of Eunapius, though their styles and attitudes were very different: Olympiodorus, as we have seen, provided detailed chronology; Eunapius thought chronological accuracy was irrelevant in a history.

It has been suggested that Olympiodorus used a single written source for his history, but Matthews rejects this because of the personal digressions contained in his writing: he points out that, though such digressions were considered an integral part of the work of ancient historians, it would have been hard to insert them seamlessly into an existing narrative. As further evidence for Olympiodorus's having brought his sources together into his own narrative, Treadgold mentions the similarities of composition and outlook between his accounts of events in the west and accounts of his activities in the east.

Though obtaining accurate information about the Western Empire was notoriously difficult, there was an increase in diplomatic and political activity between east and west after 408, which would have provided Olympiodorus, moving in court circles, with first-hand information about the latter. There were also refugees, fleeing Rome after its sack: "it would be perverse to assume that none reached Constantinople".

Olympiodorus would have met several people who contributed to recent history on his travels, whose opinions he endorsed, and which made their way into his history. These included the ambassador Jovius, sent to treat with Honorius by Alaric and the usurper Constantine III, and Candidianus, adviser to the Visigothic king Athaulf, who allied himself with Placidia and the eastern government in its war with the usurper Johannes (423–5), and who may have contributed to Olympiodorus's favourable account of Boniface.

Justinianus, a former adviser to Stilicho, was a possible source of information, whence Olympiodorus's positive account of the Vandal, which was unique in eastern or western circles. (Matthews asserts that, given the generally unfavourable view of Stilicho by contemporary historians and senators, Olympiodorus's favourable view could only have come from his supporters). Another was the imperial notary, John, who held various offices under official and usurping masters up to 422, and who was a friend of the besieger of Rome, the Visigoth Alaric. Heliocrates, appointed confiscator of Stilicho's partisans by Honorius, who carried out his job so moderately that he had to seek sanctuary from the emperor in a church,was another possible informant. The sometime Praetorian Prefect, Palladius, who had the task of raising Alaric's tribute from the aristocracy in 408, was another possible source, and may have provided Olympiodorus with his knowledge of public and private wealth. His unfavourable account of Galla Placidia mirrors those of commentators in the western Empire, where Placidia was not popular.

His detailed account of Roman statistics were most probably gleaned from the city's archives, which Olympiodorus could, as a government official, have accessed on his visit for the installation of Valentinian III (assuming he went; his description of Rome and his amazement at the splendour of the city was "almost" certainly "based on autopsy").

Olympiodorus also drew on personal experience: for instance, his account of the student initiation rites in the baths of Athens, which were unlikely to be public, is so detailed it suggests that Olympiodorus had participated in them. He learned enough of barbarian customs and language to comment on their tribal structure. The story of the silver statues (below) was told to him by Valerius, given as governor of Thrace (who may have been the son of his friend Leontius, and brother of Eudocia Augusta).

== Influence ==
Originally, the intended readership of the history may have been small, perhaps restricted to the emperor, his wife and sister, and his principal advisers. However, it was used and paraphrased by several other writers.

Sozomen, a near contemporary, wrote his Ecclesiastical History (also dedicated to Theodosius II) in the 440s. Though not the most prolific user of the history, he provides some details not found in other works, and is closer in style to the original, often preserving Olympiodorus's details, and Latinisms, by straightforward transcription of Latin characters into Greek. Sozomen switches his emphasis from the East to the West when he follows Olympiodorus, and his narrative becomes more precise. The last book (Book IX), which uses Olympiodorus as a source for a large part of it, led Matthews to note that Sozomen seems to forget he is writing an ecclesiastical history, and becomes "almost secular". Sozomen notes the powers of Stilicho, but does not present Olympiodorus's favourable view of him, merely mentioning (twice) that he was killed by soldiers in Ravenna.

Sozomen tells of the besieging of Rome by Alaric, and mentions "certain Tuscans, who… promised to drive out the barbarians with thunder and lightning; they boasted of having performed a similar exploit at Larnia". He refers to Alaric's blockade of Rome, and says that "some persons were suspected of having partaken of human flesh". He tells us that Jovius, prefect of Italy, held a conference with Alaric, after which he presented Alaric's demands to Honorius. (When the emperor refused to put Alaric in charge of the army, Sozomen tells us that Jovius thought it prudent to side with Honorius "compelling the principal officers to swear that they would never consent to any terms of peace with Alaric.") Sozomen refers to the three usurpers in Britain at this time (Mark, Gratian and Constantine III), and gives an account of the latter's adventures on the continent.

Zosimus, writing his New History at the turn of the fifth and sixth centuries, provides the fullest version of Olympiodorus's history, though he used only one fifth of it, and omitted some details used by Sozomen. Initially his history, based on the work of Eunapius, concentrated on the Eastern Empire; however he switched to the west, paraphrasing Olympiodorus, who was "the almost exclusive source" for his last chapters (Chapters 5.6-6.13). Zosimus maintains Olympiodorus's practice of providing geographical detail, giving distances in Roman miles, and a chronology using consular dating:

"the Vandals, uniting with the Alani and the Suevi, crossed" the Alps in "the three passes, which form the passage from Italy into Celtica, commonly termed the Cottian, the Pennine, and the Maritime Alps…Arcadius being in his sixth consulate and Probus was his colleague": A "report had been circulated at Rome, that the emperor Arcadius was dead, which was confirmed after the departure of Arcadius for Ravenna. Stilico being at Ravenna while the emperor was at a city of Aemilia, called Bononia, about seventy miles distant".

In the sections taken from Olympiodorus, Zosimus preserves his Latinisms, with Latin words, phrases and sentences appearing in the Greek text (with a Greek translation). Matthews notes the improvement in quality when Zosimus follows Olympiodorus, e.g. in the accuracy of titles and personal details. He draws particular attention to the change in attitude towards Stilicho in Zosimus's work: Eunapius was extremely hostile to the Vandal, which is reflected in the first references to him in the New History, which report that, through bribery, money flowed into the coffers of Stilicho (and his eastern equivalent, Rufinus); when Zosimus switches to Olympiodorus, this changes to a more sympathetic account: "He was the most moderate and just of all the men who possessed great authority in his time…he never conferred military rank for money, or coveted the stipend of the soldiers to his own use." Zosimus cites Olympiodorus once, the subject being the naming of Ravenna. Olympiodorus asserted that it took its name from Remus, who founded it with his brother Romulus, while Zosimus preferred the explanation given by Asinius Quadratus, that it was named for Rhene (water). Zosimus mentions Jovius, as does Sozomen, but in his account Jovius is sent to Honorius by Constantine III (rather than Alaric, if it is the same Jovius) to offer him an alliance. He names the British usurpers at this time, and gives a more detailed account than Sozomen of Constantine's campaign in Gaul.

The ninth-century patriarch, Photius, excerpts the history in his Biblioteca (the section pertaining to the history is known as the 46 Fragments of Olympiodorus, twelve of which have no historical content). Photius was a careful reproducer of the language and mannerisms of the authors he excerpted, and much of Olympiodorus's style survives in his work. From Photius we know of the organisation of the history, and it is he who tells us that Olympiodorus referred to himself as a poet. The Fragments stick closely to the Latin names of titles: the young Valentinian receives the title Nobilissimus; Jovian remains with Attalus as his Patricius, and it is from him we learn the names of Olympiodorus's friends. Photius decries Olympiodorus's style:

"His style is clear but loose and wanting in vigour, and sometimes degenerates into commonplace vulgarity, so that the work does not deserve to be considered a history… He is not distinguished for form, except… that he now and again approaches simplicity; but even in this, owing to the excessive meanness and paltriness of his diction, he… gradually descends to vulgar mannerism". (Note: Treadgold translates this as ‘slang’ (χυδαιολογία), and “refers to ordinary vernacular Greek, which everyone used in conversation and in practical writing with no literary pretensions”.)

The ecclesiastical historian, Philosturgius, whose work appeared between 433 and 440, is believed to have had access to Olympiodorus's entire work. Evidence for this is "complex and debatable", as the work of Philosturgius is accessible only via an epitome of Photius. The final book of Philosturgius's Ecclesiastical History (Book Twelve) covers the same ground as does the ‘’history’’, and ends with the same episode (the defeat of the usurper John and proclamation of Valentinian III as western Emperor. There are linguistic similarities between the work of Philosturgius and the relevant passages of Zosimus that suggest Olympiodorus as a common source. The Baldwins offer a list of details suggesting a connection between the respective fragments of the two authors, though their attitudes towards Stilicho were very different. (Note: This might have been due to Philosturgius’s being an Arian: “Stilicho's relative tolerance of pagans did not extend to heretics”.)

Philosturgius mentions Alaric's blockade of Rome and the ensuing famine, and says that those Romans who "had not been devoured by each other" were granted permission to bring in corn by Alaric, after he had declared Attalus emperor. One passage in Philosturgius concerns the aforementioned Olympius, the destroyer of Stilicho: "Others call this man not Olympius but Olympiodorus; and they relate not that he came to the assistance of the emperor, but that he laid plots against Stilicho, who deserved well at his hands, and falsely accused him of aiming at the empire". As Olympiodorus tells us that Stilicho's adversary was Olympius, Baldwin & Baldwin suggest that "something could easily have gone wrong with a sentence containing two such similar names".

In addition, Treadgold suggests that fragments of Olympiodorus survive in the Wars of Procopius.

It was not just other writers who were influenced by Olympiodorus. His philosopher friend Hierocles, whom he visited at Alexandria after his visit to the Blemmyes and the death of his son, was so moved by the contrast between his successful mission and his tragic loss that he was moved to write On Providence and Fate, and the Relation of What We Control to the Divine Power, which he addressed and sent to Olympiodorus to console him. (Note: There is some doubt as to whether or not Olympiodorus of Thebes was the Olympiodorus addressed by Heirocles.) In the preface to this book (summarised in Photius), Hierocles refers to Olympiodorus's skills and successes as a Roman ambassador.

The work was an official document, and contained Olympiodorus's professional opinions and policy recommendations. He advocated conciliating barbarians, which he considered often to be preferable to opposing them. (Note: For example, he endorsed Stilicho's negotiations with Alaric, and regarded the collapse of the western political system as attributable to the breakdown of these negotiations.) He blamed Honorius for failing to win over Alaric, either by acceding to what he considered his "reasonable demands", or dealing successfully with his threat.

Olympiodorus advocated support for the western empire by the East, highlighting the detrimental effects of earlier conflicts between the emperor Arcadius and Stilicho. Gillett describes his work as "a monument to the vitality of the belief in the unity of the Roman Empire under the Theodosian dynasty". Gillett notes the commitment of time and resources expended by Constantinople to support Ravenna in the face of the aggressive Vandal presence in north Africa, and suggests that Olympiodorus's work provided a "timely contribution" to the debate. In the end, Gillett asserts that the history, rather than a record of events for posterity, or a religious polemic, was a realistic assessment of affairs of state.

== Paganism ==
Photius refers to Olympiodorus as a "heathen", which may have denoted a "dynamic cultural tradition" rather than a "specifically religious commitment". Olympiodorus was addressing a Christian court, but there was a certain amount of tolerance for pagan ideas: both Theodosius II and the Empress Eudocia were patrons of Hellenistic learning. He felt able to assert that pagan cult objects could help the empire if they were respected (and hinder it if they were not). He credits the downfall of Stilicho and his wife to their plundering of pagan temple treasures, and blamed the Romans' capitulation to Alaric on their having melted down a statue of Virtus, who then abandoned Rome. In Sozomen's account of the Tuscans who offered to call up a storm to save Rome from Alaric, they assert that their town was saved by "the devotion of its inhabitants to the gods, in the ancient mode of worship". The Prefect took the suggestion to the Bishop of Rome, who gave permission for the pagan rites to be carried out in private. However, the visitors attested that their rites would have no power unless they were done in full view of the public, and so were sent away. Olympiodorus regarded the professed Christian piety of the "impious wretch" Olympius as incompatible with his public office, and applauds the principled refusal of the general Generidus, who resigned his position in protest at a law prohibiting pagans from holding office. He made "sour" comments about the wealthy Anicii family, who were unhappy at the prospect of losing their near monopoly of the city's wealth after Attalus's appointment of officials "well acquainted with the management of affairs": Baldwin & Baldwin suggest that his attitude was due to the Anicii being Christian, rather than to their wealth alone. Olympiodorus suggests that Attalus incurred the wrath of the gods by his arrogant words to the Senate "in which he told them with great ostentation that he would subdue the whole world to the Romans, and even perform greater things than that".

Thompson refers to the "great attraction" of Neoplatonism at the time, and suggests this was an early influence on Olympiodorus. However, he did not allow his religious beliefs to cloud his impartiality: he took a dim view of the neoplatonist thaumaturge (magician) Libanius, who promised to repel a barbarian incursion using magic, without the aid of soldiers, but who was put to death by order of Placidia in 421. (Note: Compare this with what Zosimus tells us about Attalus, who, having been declared emperor by Alaric, then refused to follow his advice to send a "competent force" to depose the usurper Heraclianus in Africa: "Attalus would not listen to his admonitions, being filled with expectations given him by the soothsayers, that he should subdue Carthage and all Africa without fighting”)

His journey to Athens in 416 is prefaced by a tale of three statues that had been interred near Thrace:

"three statues of solid silver were found, lying in barbaric guise, with arms akimbo, clothed in part-coloured barbaric raiment, with long hair, turned towards the north, the country of the barbarians. When these statues were removed, the Goths a few days afterwards first overran and ravaged Thrace, and a little later Huns and Sarmatians made inroads into Illyricum and Thrace itself, for these consecrated districts lay between Thrace and Illyricum, and from the number of the statues consecrated, they appear to have been intended as a protection against these barbarous nations".

Treadgold is sceptical about these statues, finding the dates and personnel involved impossible to reconcile. Another fragment details a statue, endowed with a magic spell, which stood at Rhegium (Reggio Calabria), and which protected Sicily from the fires of Mount Etna (Aetna) and from barbarians attempting to cross the Strait of Messina. To this statue Olympiodorus credited the failure of Alaric to invade Sicily in 410. When the statue was pulled down on the orders of Placidia and Constantius III, Mt Etna erupted, and barbarians invaded Sicily (between 417 and 421).
