= Hunnic language =

Extinct unclassified language of the Huns

Hunnic
- Native to: Hunnic Empire
- Region: From Eurasian steppe into Europe
- Ethnicity: Huns
- Extinct: after 469
- Language family: unclassified

Language codes
- ISO 639-3: xhc
- Glottolog: None
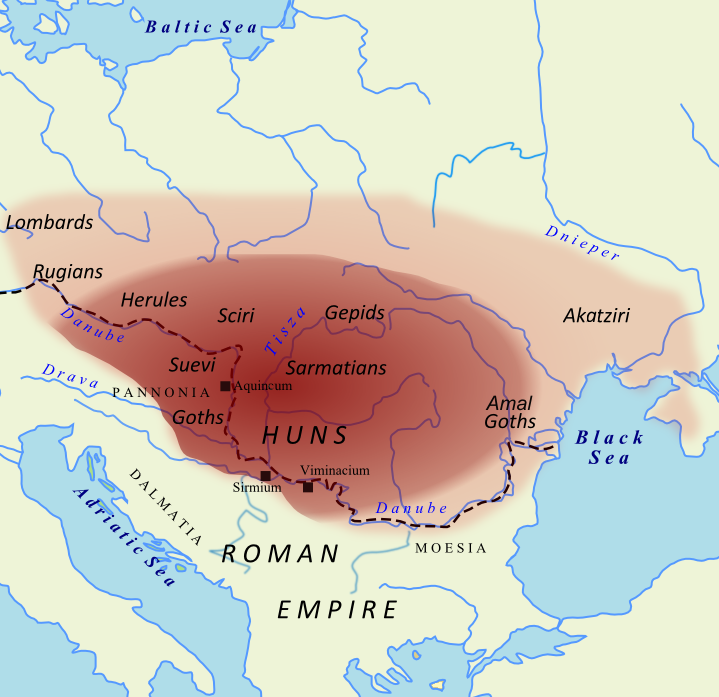
- Estimated map of Hunnic political control under Attila (c. 450 CE), and a rough map of the extent of the Hunnic language

The Hunnic language, or Hunnish, was the language spoken by Huns in the Hunnic Empire, a heterogeneous, multi-ethnic tribal confederation which invaded Eastern and Central Europe, and ruled most of Pannonian Central Europe during the 4th and 5th centuries CE. A variety of languages were spoken within the Hun Empire. A contemporary report by Priscus has that Hunnish was spoken alongside Gothic and the languages of other tribes subjugated by the Huns.

As no inscriptions or whole sentences in the Hunnic language have been preserved, the attested corpus is very limited, consisting almost entirely of proper names in Greek and Latin sources.

There is no consensus on the classification of the Hunnish language, but due to the origin of these proper names it has been compared with Turkic, Mongolic, Tungusic, and Yeniseian languages, and with various Indo-European languages, such as Iranian. Other scholars consider the available evidence inconclusive and the Hunnish language therefore unclassifiable.

== Corpus ==
Contemporary observers of the Huns in Europe, such as Priscus and the 6th century historian Jordanes, identified three words belonging to the language of the Huns:

In the villages we were supplied with food – millet instead of corn – and medos as the natives call it. The attendants who followed us received millet and a drink of barley, which the barbarians call kamos.

When the Huns had mourned him [Attila] with such lamentations, a strava, as they call it, was celebrated over his tomb with great revelling.

The words medos, a beverage akin to mead, kamos, a barley drink, and strava, a funeral feast, are of Indo-European origin, possibly Slavic, Germanic or Iranian. Maenchen-Helfen argued that strava may have come from an informant who spoke a Slavic language rather than it being a genuine Hunnic word.

All other information on the Hunnic language is contained in the form of personal and tribal names.

== Possible affiliations ==
Many of the waves of nomadic peoples who swept into Eastern Europe, are known to have spoken languages from a variety of families. Several proposals for the affinities of Hunnic have been made, however there is no consensus.

=== Unclassifiable ===
Given the small corpus, a number of scholars hold the Hunnic language to be unclassifiable until further evidence, if any, is discovered. András Róna-Tas notes that "the very scant sources of information are often mutually contradictory."

=== Turkic or Altaic sprachbund ===
According to Savelyev and Jeong (2020), the "traditional and prevailing view is [...] that the Xiongnu and/or the Huns were Turkic or at least Altaic" speakers. Otto Maenchen-Helfen argues that many tribal and some personal names among the Huns appear to have originated in Turkic languages, indicating that a Turkic language was widely spoken. Hyun Jin Kim similarly concluded that it "seems highly likely then from the names that we do know, most of which seem to be Turkic, that the Hunnic elite was predominantly Turkic-speaking". Denis Sinor, while skeptical of our ability to classify Hunnic as a whole, states that part of the Hunnish elite likely spoke Turkic, though he notes that some Hunnic names cannot be Turkic in origin.

Some scholars have argued against a Turkic linguistic affiliation for Hunnic. The historian Peter Heather, while he supported the Turkic hypothesis as the "best guess" in 1995, has since voiced skepticism, in 2010 saying that "the truth is that we don't know what language the Huns spoke, and probably never will". Savelyev and Jeong similarly note that "the majority of the previously proposed Turkic etymologies for the Hunnic names are far from unambiguous, so no firm conclusion can be drawn from this type of data."

While he argued for a Turkic linguistic origin, Karl Heinrich Menges also suggested that the Huns could have spoken a Mongolian or Tungusic language, or possibly a language between Mongolian and Turkic. Omeljan Pritsak analyzed 33 surviving Hunnic personal names and concluded: "It was not a Turkic language, but one between Turkic and Mongolian, probably closer to the former than the latter. The language had strong ties to Bulgar language and to modern Chuvash, but also had some important connections, especially lexical and morphological, to Ottoman Turkish and Yakut".

Linguists Svenja Bonmann and Simon Fries in 2025 challenged the Turkic hypothesis. They state that there is a "complete lack of evidence supporting claims of a Turkic presence among the Huns". They further note that the traditional classification of Hunnic as a variety of the Bulgar language is based "mainly on historical rather than proper linguistic evidence" with the surviving Hunnic material consisting only of a small number of personal names and common nouns that "do not provide any conclusive proof and may actually be linguistically heterogeneous".

=== Yeniseian ===
Scholars such as Lajos Ligeti (1950/51), Edwin G. Pulleyblank (1962), and Alexander Vovin have proposed that the Xiongnu, and possibly the European Huns, spoke a Yeniseian language such as an ancestor of Ket. Hyun Jin Kim in 2013 proposed that the Huns experienced a language flip like the Chagatai Khanate, switching from Yeniseian to Oghuric Turkic after absorbing the Dingling or Tiele peoples. In 2025, a study by Svenja Bonmann and Simon Fries proposed Yeniseian etymologies for three Hunnic names, Attila, Eskam and Atakam, using this and evidence of Yeniseian river names along the proposed migration route of the Huns from East and Central Asia to argue that the Huns and Xiongnu spoke a Yeniseian language that was related to Arin.

Alexander Savelyev and Choongwon Jeong criticize the Yeniseian proposal by Pulleyblank and note that the more convincing Yeniseian words may be shared cultural vocabulary that was non-native to both the Xiongnu and the Yeniseians. A review by Wilson (2023) argues that the presence of Yeniseian-speakers among the multi-ethnic Xiongnu should not be rejected, and that "Yeniseian-speaking peoples must have played a more prominent (than heretofore recognized) role in the history of Eurasia during the first millennium of the Common Era".

=== Indo-European ===
All three words described as "Hunnic" by ancient sources appear to be Indo-European.

A number of scholars suggest that a Germanic language, possibly Gothic, may have coexisted with another Hunnic language as the lingua franca of the Hunnic Empire. Maenchen-Helfen suggests that the words medos and kamos could possibly be of Germanic origin. He argues that Attila, Bleda, Laudaricus, Onegesius, Ragnaris, and Ruga are Germanic, while Heather also includes the names Scottas and Berichus. Kim questions the Germanic etymologies of Ruga, Attila, and Bleda, arguing that there are "more probable Turkic etymologies." Elsewhere, he argues that the Germanicization of Hunnic names may have been a conscious policy of the Hunnic elite in the Western part of the Empire.

Maenchen-Helfen also classified some names as having roots in Iranian. Christopher Atwood has argued, as one explanation for his proposed etymology of the name Hun that, "their state or confederation must be seen as the result of Sogdian/Baktrian [Iranian-speaking] leadership and organization". Subjects of the Huns included Iranian-speaking Alans and Sarmatians, Maenchen-Helfen argues that the Iranian names were likely borrowed from the Persians and finds none prior to the 5th century; he takes this to mean that the Alans had little influence inside of Attila's empire. Kim, however, argues for a considerable presence of Iranian-speakers among the Huns.

The word strava has been argued to be of Slavic origin and to show a presence of Slavic speakers among the Huns. Peter Heather, however, argues that this word "is certainly a very slender peg upon which to hang the claim that otherwise undocumented Slavs played a major role in Attila's empire". In the 19th century, some Russian scholars argued that the Huns as a whole had spoken a Slavic language.

=== Uralic ===
In the 19th century, some scholars, such as German Sinologist Julius Heinrich Klaproth, argued that the Huns had spoken a Uralic language and connected them with the ancient Hungarians.

== Possible script ==
It is possible that a written form of Hunnic existed and may yet be identified from artifacts. Priscus recorded that Hunnic secretaries read out names of fugitives from a written list. Franz Altheim considered it was not Greek or Latin, but a script like the Oguric Turkic of the Bulgars. He argued that the runes were brought into Europe from Central Asia by the Huns, and were an adapted version of the old Sogdian alphabet in the Hunnic (Oghur Turkic) language. Zacharias Rhetor wrote that in 507/508 AD, Bishop Qardust of Arran went to the land of the Caucasian Huns for seven years, and returned with books written in the Hunnic language. There is some debate as to whether a Xiongnu-Xianbei runic system existed, and was part of a wider Eurasian script which gave rise to the Old Turkic alphabet in the 8th century.
