= Polyeuctus =

Roman/Armenian martyr and saint (died 259)

Saint Polyeuctus
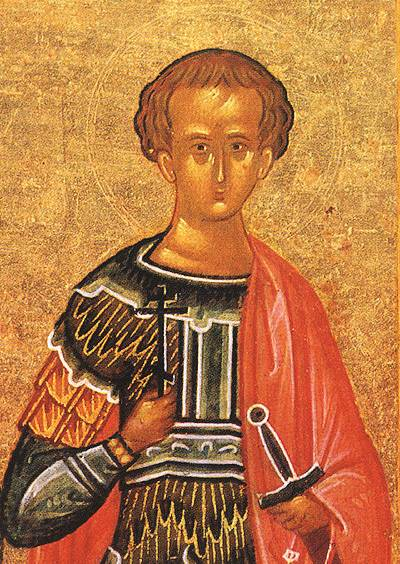
- Died: 10 January 259 AD; Melitene, Kingdom of Armenia (modern-day Malatya, Turkey)
- Venerated in: Eastern Orthodox Church; Roman Catholic Church
- Feast: 9 January (Eastern Orthodox Church); 7 January (Catholic Church)
- Patronage: Vows and treaty agreements

Saint Polyeuctus (also Polyeuctes, Polyeuktos, Greek: Πολύευκτος) of Melitene (died 10 January 259) is a Christian saint from the Roman era.

== Life ==
Christian tradition states that he was a wealthy Roman army officer who was the first martyr in Melitene, Armenia, under Valerian. He and his friend Nearchus were members of the Legio XII Fulminata, based in Melitene. Certain historical inaccuracies suggest that his passio was written at least 100 years after the events described.

Symeon Metaphrastes writes that, moved by the zeal of his friend Saint Nearchus, Polyeuctus had openly converted to Christianity. "Enflamed with zeal, St Polyeuctus went to the city square, and tore up the edict of Decius which required everyone to worship idols. A few moments later, he met a procession carrying twelve idols through the streets of the city. He dashed the idols to the ground and trampled them underfoot."

He was tortured by the authorities and ignored the tears and protestations of his wife Paulina, his children, and his father-in-law. He was beheaded.

== Veneration ==
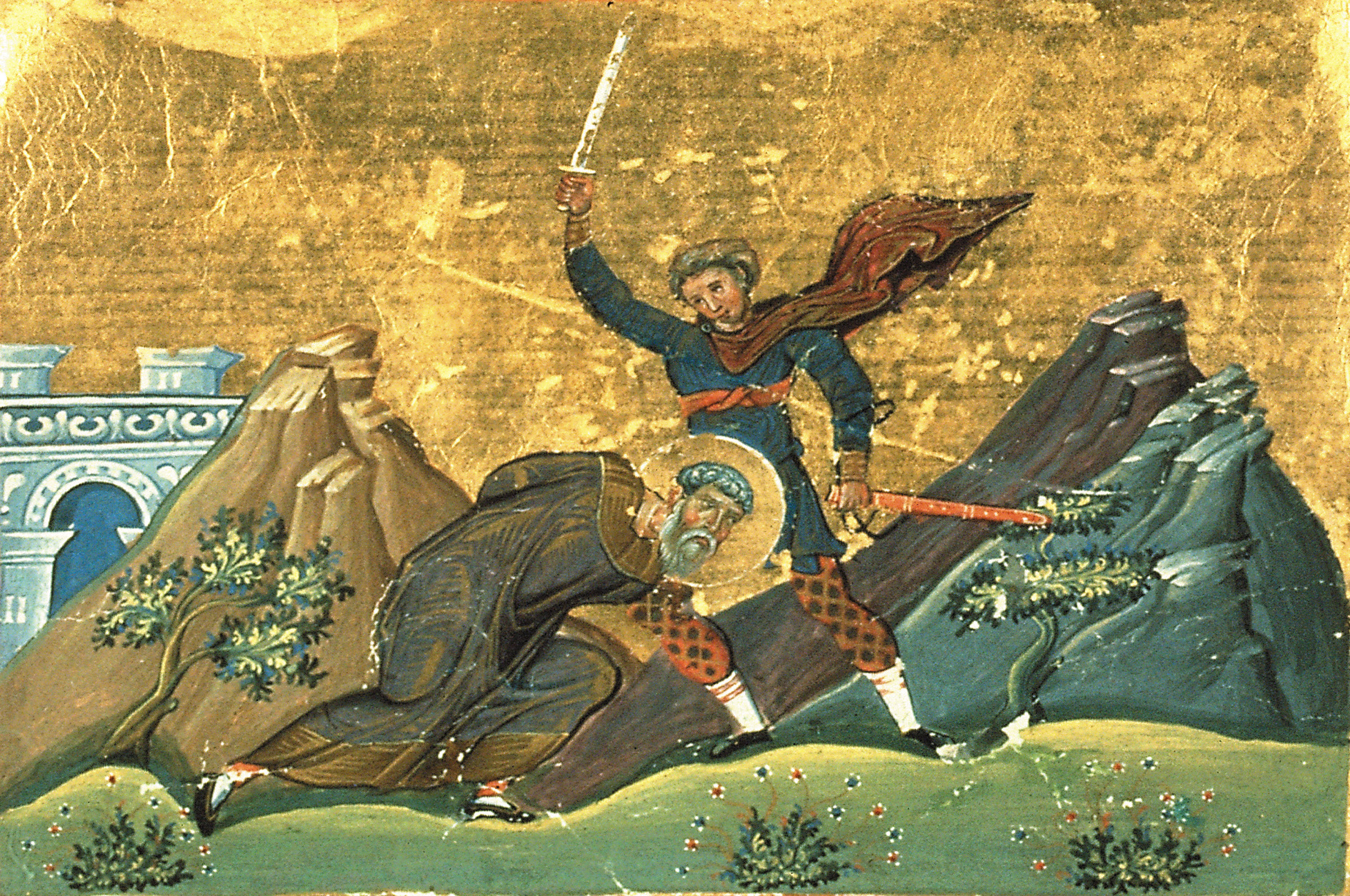
Painting depicting the martyrdom of Polyeuctus, from the Menologion of Basil II (c. 1000 AD)

He was buried at Melitene, and a church was dedicated to him there. Christian tradition states that the parents of Euthymius the Great prayed for a son at the church of St. Polyeuctus in Melitene.

A church was dedicated to him at Constantinople by Anicia Juliana in 524–527. The excavations undertaken in the 1960s revealed that, at the time of Justinian's ascension to the throne, the basilica was the largest in Constantinople and that it featured a remarkably ostentatious display of wealth, such as gilded reliefs of peacocks, as well as much oriental detail. The relics here were later moved to the nearby Church of the Holy Apostles.

There was a cult of Polyeuctus at Metz, possibly introduced by Nicetius, Bishop of Trier. A church was built not far from the royal palace. Polyeuctus is the patron saint of vows and treaty agreements. Polyeuctus is invoked as guarantor of a treaty of Sigebert I around 568 to divide the kingdom of his late brother Charibert I. Medieval historian Stefan Esders suggests that some relics of Polyeuctus came west about the same time that Radegund obtained a relic of the True Cross.

His feast day was 7 January in the ancient Armenian calendars; and is 7 January in the Catholic calendar. In the Eastern Orthodox liturgics, his feast falls on 9 January.

== Cultural references ==
Pierre Corneille, inspired by the account of Polyeuctus' martyrdom, used elements from the saint's story in his tragedy Polyeucte (1642). In 1878 it was adapted into an opera by Charles Gounod, with the assistance of the librettist Jules Barbier.

Other works based on the play include a ballet by Marc-Antoine Charpentier (1679), and the opera Poliuto (1838) by Donizetti (adapted with Scribe as Les martyrs). Paul Dukas composed his Polyeucte overture, which premiered in January 1892.
