= Olybrius (consul 491) =

Roman Politician

Flavius Olybrius (Greek: Ολύβριος fl. 491-after 532) was an aristocrat of the Eastern Roman Empire and sole consul for the year 491. He is sometimes referred to as "Olybrius Junior" in the sources, probably referencing his young age. Olybrius was through his mother Anicia Juliana a descendant of the conjoined Valentinianic and Theodosian dynasties, and the grandson of the emperor Olybrius (r. 472) and the great-grandson of Western Roman Emperor Valentinian III (r. 425–455). He was also a potential augustus on the death of the Eastern Roman Emperor Zeno (r. 474–491) of the Leonid dynasty.

== Life ==
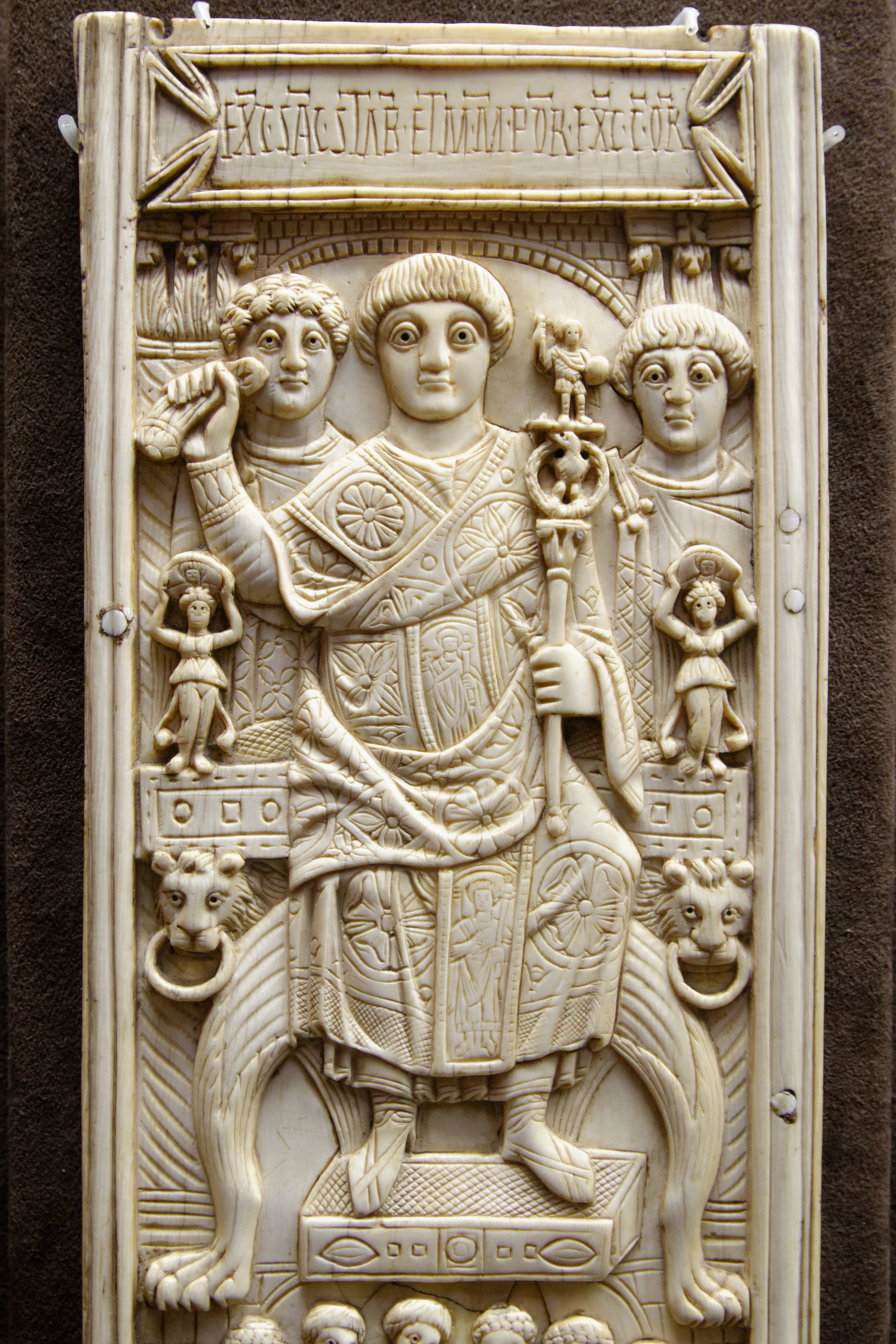
Areobindus Dagalaifus Areobindus, Olybrius' father

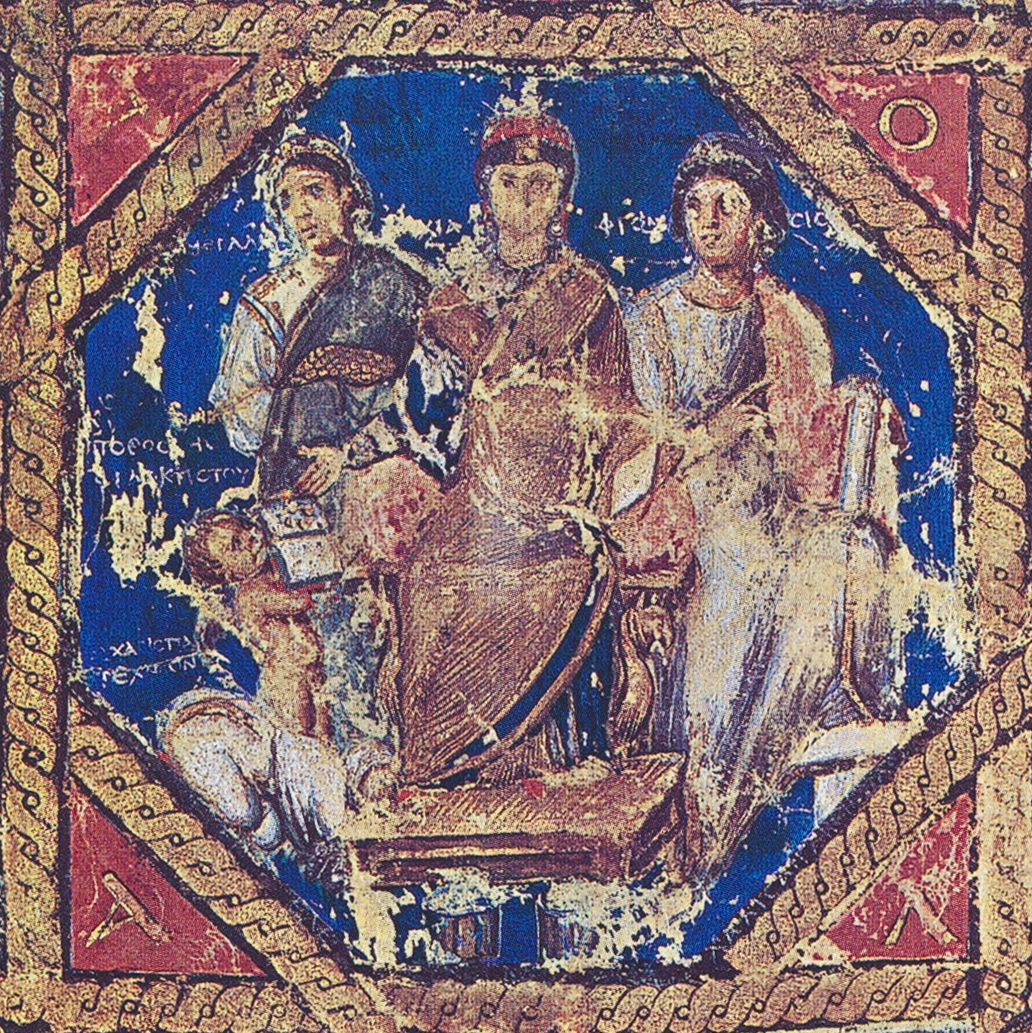
Anicia Juliana, Olybrius' mother

Olybrius was the son of Areobindus Dagalaifus Areobindus, magister militum from 503 to 504 and consul in 506, and of Anicia Juliana, the daughter of the Western Roman Emperor Olybrius and wife Placidia, who was the daughter of the Western Roman Emperor Valentinian III and wife Licinia Eudoxia.

Alan Cameron explains, "It may be that, alone among the consuls here discussed, Olybrius was actually known as 'Olybrius the younger' in social as well as consular contexts. Nor is it hard to think of a reason why: he became consul as a mere child, barely ten years old, perhaps even less."

He was appointed consul at a very young age in 491. Afterwards, Olybrius married Irene, the daughter of Paulus and niece of Eastern Roman Emperor Anastasius I (r. 491–518); Anastasius wanted to strengthen his rule through a bond with the Theodosian dynasty through this marriage. However Olybrius and Irene had only daughters, one of whom was named Proba, so he cannot be the father of Olybrius, the consul in 526.

He was exiled in 532 by Eastern Roman Emperor Justinian I (r. 527–565) after being implicated in a plot. His properties were seized, including the Church of St. Polyeuctus which his mother had commissioned and a great house which stood on an adjoining site to the church. He was eventually allowed to return sometime later and his seized properties were returned. Nothing is known about how he or his family fared after this.

== Notes ==
Political offices
Preceded by Anicius Probus Faustus, Longinus	Roman consul 491	Succeeded by Anastasius I, Rufus
