= Onegesius =

Hunnic noble

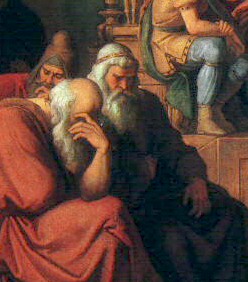
Mór Than, The Feast of Attila (1870), detail of a man sitting to the right of the Hunnic king

Onegesius (Ancient Greek: Ὀνηγήσιος, romanized: Onegesios) was a powerful Hunnic logades (minister) who supposedly held power second only to Attila the Hun. According to Priscus he "seated on a chair to the right of the king" i.e. Attila.

== History ==
Priscus, who was on a mission to Attila in 448 or 449 AD, says that Onegesius lived in the same very populous village Attila resided. He recounts:

After the king's compound, Onegesios's was magnificent and also itself had an enclosing log wall. His was not equipped with towers like Attila's; rather there was a bath, not far from the enclosing wall, which Onegesios, as the preeminent man among the Scythians [Huns] after Attila, built large by conveying stones from Paionia ... the bath's architect, brought in from Sirmium as a prisoner of war ... Onegesios made him the bath attendant to serve him and his comrades while they were bathing.

According to Onegesius's order Priscus and Maximinus were greeted by his wife at his compound. That the honour and respect of his supporters were important to Attila is shown from Priscus testimony:

Attila approached Onegesios's compound, Onegesios's wife came out with multitude of servants, some of whom were carrying food others wine. This is a very great honor among Scythian women. She greeted him and begged him to partake of what she was kind-heartedly offering him. Showing favor to the wife of his adviser, he ate sitting on his horse as the barbarians accompanying him raised the platter up to him.

Priscus recounts a rare story of a Greek he encountered in the village, and who managed to get freedom from the Huns, but decided to live among them:

He was a Greek-speaking Roman merchant from Viminacium, a city on the river Danube... When the city was captured by the barbarians [Huns, 441], he was deprived of his prosperity and because of his accrued wealth assigned to Onegesius, for Attila the leading man ... chose their captives from the wealthy captives. Having proven his valour in later battles against the Romans and the Akatziri and having, according to [Hunnic] law, given his booty to his master, he had won his freedom. He had married a barbarian wife and had children, and, as a sharer of the table of Onegesius, he now enjoyed a better life than he had before.

Onegesius and his brother Skottas were persons of special interest to the Romans in their failed plot to assassinate Attila in 448 or 449 AD, which included Chrysaphius and Hun Edeco, but Onegesius was most of the time away. Priscus recounts "Since Onegesius was away, I said, he [Skottas] needed to support us, and more his brother, in pursuit of this good business. I said we knew Attila followed his guidance too, but we would not firmly believe the reports about him unless we came to know his power through experience. He replied that no one any longer doubted Attila deemed his words and deeds equal to his brother's. And he immediately mounted his horse and rode to Attila's tent".

The barbarians acted cleverly and "awaited Onegesios's return in order to deliver the gifts we ourselves wanted to give and those the emperor sent". Onegesios "along with the eldest (probably Ellac) of Attila's children, had been sent to the Akateri, a Scythian people, whom he was bringing into an alliance with Attila". As the Akatziroi tribes and clans were ruled by different leaders, emperor Theodosius II tried with gifts to spread animosity among them, but the gifts were not delivered according to rank, Kouridachos, warned and called Attila against fellow leaders. So Attila did, Kardach stayed with his tribe or clan in own territory, while the rest of the Akatziroi became subjected to Attila. He "desired to make his eldest son their king, and so sent Onegesios to do it".

Maximinus, not knowing that the plot failed, tried to bribe Onegesius, "that the time has come for Onegesios to have greater fame among men, if he would go to the emperor, use his intelligence to understand their disputes and establish harmony between the Romans and the Huns. It would, he said, not only be thenceforward advantageous to both nations but it would also provide many benefits for his own house: he himself and his children would forever be friends of the emperor and his descendants". It was supposed to be done by crossing into Roman territory, establishing relations with the emperor, studying and resolving the causes of the disputes. Onegesius responded:

That he would say to the emperor and his courtiers what Attila wanted. Or, he said, did the Romans think they would cajole him so much that he would altogether betray his master and scorn his rearing among Scythians and his wives and children? Did they think he would not consider slavery with Attila greater than wealth among the Romans? He would be more useful, he said, staying home (since he soothed his master's heart whenever he grew angry at the Romans) than traveling to Roman territory and being suspected of acting contrary to Attila's principles.

In the end he composed along his secretaries and Roustikios the letter according to Attila's will which has been delivered to the emperor. He also released the wife of certain Sullos for 500 gold coins, and his children sent as a gift to the emperor. They were captured in the fall of Ratiaria.

== Etymology ==
Onegesius's name is attested in Greek as Ὀνηγήσιος (Onēgēsios). The same name may be attested in the Vita Sancti Lupi as Hunigasius. Otto J. Maenchen-Helfen and Omeljan Pritsak both considered the endings -os/us or -ios/ius to be a Greek addition to the name.

Maenchen-Helfen considered the name to be of East Germanic origin, reconstructing it as Hunigis, a name attested elsewhere. He argues that the first element, hun-, most likely means either "cub of a bear, young man" or "high".

Omeljan Pritsak derived Onegesi / Hunigasi from roots akin to Mongolian *ünen (truth) and the Oghuz Turkic suffix gās-i. The reconstructed form is actually an epithet *üne-gāsi (honest, faithful, truthful, loyal), which was shown by Onegesius in his loyal behaviour toward Attila.

Others have suggested Turkic etymologies. L. Rásonyi derived the name from Turkic oneki (twelve), an etymology that Maenchen-Helfen rejects. F. Altheim and R. Stiehl derived it from Turkic on-iyiz, meaning "he who commands ten", a reference to the steppe system of organizing command in groups of ten.
