= Berichus =

Hun nobleman

Berichus or Berik (fl. 449) was a Hun nobleman, ambassador, and lord, said to have "ruled over many villages".

He was appointed by Attila as ruler over many towns. Priscus, in his account of his visit to the court of Attila, recounts that after his visit to the Huns, Berichus, looking for "gifts from Theodosius", left with them. Attila sent him with the Romans to Constantinople as an ambassador. During the travel, he had an argument with the Romans, because the Roman ambassador Maximinus insulted the former ambassadors of barbarian origin Aspar and Areobindus.
