= Scottas =

Hun nobleman

Scottas or Skottas (fl. 448 AD) was a Hun nobleman, ambassador and advisor. He was the brother of Onegesius.

When Priscus went with Maximinus' embassy to the court of Attila, they attempted to meet the Hun king, but an audience was repeatedly refused by the king. He then tried to convince Scottas into allowing a meeting with Attila, by telling him that the knew of his influence over Attila, and offering him gifts. Priscus apparently assumed that his tactics worked as he reports that thereby Scottas "immediately mounted on his horse and galloped away to Attila's tent". However, in the words of Christopher Kelly, "it was Priscus who had been fooled".

The Huns already knew of the Romans' plot. Attila had been rejecting an audience with the Roman embassy after he himself requested the embassy to be sent. He knew that if Maximinus suspected his embassy was compromised, insisting of meeting them would be reckless. Scottas, to whom gifts were promised, was eventually the one sent back to tell the Romans they could come to Attila's tent.

== Etymology ==
The name might be of Germanic, or Iranian origin.
