= Slave of the Huns =

A láthatatlan ember (cover, 1943 edition)

Slave of the Huns is a novel by the Hungarian writer Géza Gárdonyi, published in 1901. The original Hungarian title is A láthatatlan ember, which translates literally as The Invisible Man, but its title was changed in English (probably to differentiate it from H. G. Wells's novel).

In the opinion of some people, including Gárdonyi himself, it is his best work. In 2005 it was ranked no. 38 in the Hungarian version of the survey "Big Read". An English translation by Andrew Feldmár was first published in 1969.

== Plot summary ==
It is set around the time of Attila the Hun, and part of it is based on the Byzantine diplomat Priscus's account of his visit to Attila's court.

The narrator and hero of the novel is a young Byzantine nicknamed Zeta. At the start he is sold into slavery as a child, and bought by Maximinus, in whose household he is treated sadistically. He then becomes a slave of Priscus, who treats him much better, and eventually frees him. He accompanies Priscus on his visit to Attila, and falls in love with Emmo, the daughter of a Hunnish nobleman (a "princesse lointaine" figure). He commits himself to slavery among the Huns in the hope of eventually marrying her, to some extent going native among them.

It includes dramatic accounts of the Battle of the Catalaunian Plains between the Huns and the Romans, and the funeral of Attila.

It may have been influenced by earlier works such as Walter Scott's novel Waverley, Shakespeare's play Henry V and Tolstoy's novel The Cossacks.

== See also ==
- Attila the Hun in popular culture

== Notes ==
- Amazon review
- online review
- Online text of the original Hungarian
