= Andrew Feldmár =

Hungarian psychologist

- Feldmár András
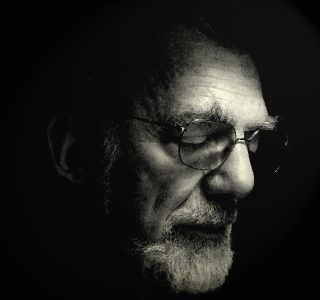
- Born: 28 October 1940 (age 85); Budapest, Hungary
- Occupation: psychotherapist
- Website: https://www.andrewfeldmar.ca

Andrew Feldmár (Feldmár András; born 28 October 1940, in Budapest) is a Hungarian-born psychotherapist living in Canada. He is most known as the Hungarian follower of R. D. Laing, the Scottish psychiatrist who was one of the leading figures of the counterculture of the 1960s. Laing, who later became his friend, was his teacher and therapist first. Following his mentor, Feldmár practices and popularizes a form of radical psychotherapy, where the main goal of the therapist is to engage in a real, spontaneous and honest relationship with the patient. This approach is based on the findings of research on interpersonal phenomenology, spiritual emergency, the anthropology of healing, existential psychotherapy and community therapy. Feldmár rejects the labelling of human suffering, and therefore distances himself from the mainstream forms of psychiatry and psychotherapy which are based on the concept of mental illness. He has published many books in Hungarian, and he lectures, teaches, and provides supervision and therapy internationally, he has worked as a psychotherapist with over 52 years of experience, having spent more than 100,000 hours in psychotherapy with clients. He has been noticeably successful treating psychotic patients. He is a well-known expert in psychedelic-assisted psychotherapy.

== Biography ==
Andrew Feldmár was born in Budapest, Hungary in 1940 in a non-religious Jewish family. When he was 3 and a half years old his mother was taken to Auschwitz, his father to a labor camp, and his grandmother to the Budapest ghetto. However, his father managed to arrange for a young Catholic woman to take the young Andrew. For a year and a half he was living with a woman named Irén Igaz (in Hungarian her last name means ‘true, truthful, righteous’) and her kids. To protect him, he had to be called by a different name. His relatives came back around 1945. After the defeat of the 1956 revolution, at the age of 16 he immigrated to Canada alone.

Feldmár holds an Honours BA in mathematics, physics and chemistry from the University of Toronto, as well as an MA in psychology from the University of Western Ontario. He is an Honorary Life Member of the Canadian Psychological Association. Feldmár is married; he has a daughter and a son.

== Career ==
Feldmár had been trained in the practice of psychotherapy and was trained and supervised in LSD therapy under R.D. Laing in London between 1974-75. During this year he also studied from a wide range of well-known experts of their fields: Francis Huxley, John Heaton, Hugh Crawford and Leon Redler. Feldmár also worked with one of the founders of transpersonal psychology Stanislav Grof at the Esalen Institute in California. He gained further experience in the field while volunteering at Hollywood Hospital in New Westminster, where LSD was legally used for research and therapy. He gained experience in Brief psychotherapy in Palo Alto in the research group of Paul Watzlawick. While still legal, he had been involved in different projects concerning the use of MDMA in psychotherapy. In 2008 Feldmár was involved in a research study, sponsored by the Multidisciplinary Association for Psychedelic Studies (MAPS) to show the efficacy of MDMA as an adjunct to psychotherapy with severe cases of PTSD. He is currently a mentor in the Certificate in Psychedelic-Assisted Therapies and Research program in California. Although he promotes the benefits of research and use of psychedelics in therapy he does not practice it due to its illegality.

He has participated in many research projects and taught, lectured and lead workshops at the Simon Fraser University (SFU), University of British Columbia (UBC), Emily Carr and Douglas College, The Cold Mountain Institute, The Collingwood Institute and meetings of BC Psychologists Association as well as in Europe (e.g. London and Stuttgart). In Hungary he is a frequent participant of popular open lectures and podiums, he has a regular column with Dorottya Büky in the Hungarian newspaper HVG.

In 1989, he was a guest on a 3-part CBC Ideas radio series entitled R.D. Laing Today. He has also worked as a consultant in both television and film (e.g. Showcase's Kink series). He founded the Integra Households Association, a non profit charity working with those in extreme mental distress. In the 1987 film, Did You Used to be R.D. Laing? which he co-produced, Feldmár played together with Laing. He also played in the 2013 documentary, From Neurons to Nirvana: The Great Medicines. In 2007, he appeared in an episode of the Colbert Report, after he was banned from the US for several years as the result of a border guard googling his work.

Feldmár worked for several international organizations as a specialist in mental health. In 1993 he took part in the UNESCO Chernobyl Program in Minsk, Belarus. He participated in training specialists for the Community Mental Health Centers for the victims of the Chernobyl catastrophe. For two weeks in 1996 he was a consultant for the United Nations High Commission for Refugees (UNHCR) in Bosnia and Croatia.

To popularize Feldmár's work, his theoretical and practical approach to mental health Andrew Feldmár and a group of professionals in 2006 founded an institute in Budapest, Hungary, called Feldmár Intézet (in English: Feldmár Institute). The nonprofit organization is organizing and hosting popular events and an annual summer school. The Institute sponsors a reintegration program for inmates which has proven to be significantly successful. (Only 5 out of the 65 convicted participants are registered as re-offenders, while the national rate is 50%.) The Institute is also involved in the sponsorship and professional work of the Soteria Shelter program in Budapest, a non-coercive alternative to psychiatric hospitalization. In 2019, Feldmár Institut Stuttgart was officially founded.

Feldmár has been writing poems since his childhood. In the mid 60's he was the Poet of the Month on Toronto's CHQM radio, and his poetry was read at the Vancouver Art Gallery. In 2007 a selection of his haikus was published in a bilingual (English-Hungarian) poetry book. His poems were translated by the famous Hungarian contemporary poet Dezső Tandori. He translated Géza Gárdonyi's novel, Slave of the Huns which was first published in English in 1969.

Two full-length portrait films have been made about him in Hungary: Bence Fliegauf's 2002 documentary Van élet a halál előtt? ("Is There Life Before Death?") and the 2024 film Amit egyedül egyikünk sem látna ("What None of Us Would See Alone"), directed by András Krámli.

Andrew Feldmár's debut book in English, Credo: R. D. Laing and Radical Psychotherapy was published in the UK in June 2023 by Karnac Books. His new book in English, titled Radical Adventure: An Inquiry into Psychedelic Psychotherapy, was published by Karnac Books in February 2025. The German translation of Radical Adventure was published in October 2026 by the Swiss publisher Nachtschatten Verlag.

== Bibliography ==
- A tudatállapotok szivárványa (1997, ISBN 963-04-8872-8; 1998, ISBN 963-04-9875-8)
- Van élet a halál előtt? – beszélgetések Feldmár Andrással (Fliegauf Benedek, 2004, ISBN 963-9604-00-3)
- Beszélgetések Feldmár Andrással, A tudatállapotok szivárványa szerzőjével (2002, ISBN 963-204-437-1)
- Apró részletekben (2004, ISBN 978-963-216-802-9)
- Végzet, sors, szabad akarat (2004, ISBN 978-963-7168-08-6) with Ranschburg Jenő and Popper Péter
- A tudatállapotok szivárványa (2006, ISBN 978-963-204-437-8)
- Feldmár mesél – Egy terapeuta történetei. (2007, ISBN 978-963-9604-26-1)
- Küszöbgyakorlatok (2007, ISBN 978-963-9604-39-1) – with Büky Dorottya
- Szégyen és szeretet (2008, ISBN 978-963-9604-50-6)
- A tudatállapotok szivárványa (2007, ISBN 978-963-86669-7-0 – second edition)
- Igazi vagy? Iskola nőknek (2008, ISBN 978-963-9604-67-4) – with Bernát Orsolya and Büky Dorottya
- Szabadság, szerelem (2009, ISBN 978-963-9604-78-0)
- A tudatállapotok szivárványa (2010, ISBN 978-963-9971-12-7 – revised edition)
- A barna tehén fia (2010, ISBN 978-963-9971-35-6) – with Büky Dorottya
- Szabadíts meg a Gonosztól! (2011, ISBN 978-963-9971-15-8)
- Belső utakon – A Nyitott Akadémia válogatott előadásai önismeretről, sorsról és szabadságról (2011, ISBN 978-963-89419-3-0); with Bagdy Emőke, Dr. Czeizel Endre, Dr. Csernus Imre, Daubner Béla, Kádár Annamária, Kígyós Éva, Pál Ferenc, Popper Péter, Ranschburg Jenő, Szendi Gábor
- Ébredések (2012, ISBN 978-963-9971-86-8)
- Útmutató tévelygőknek (2012, ISBN 978-615-5235-31-3) – with Büky Dorottya
- Most vagy soha (2014, ISBN 978-963-304-153-6)
- Életunalom, élettér, életkedv (2014, ISBN 978-963-304-181-9)
- Hogyan lesz a gyerekből felnőtt? (2014, ISBN 978-963-304-195-6)
- Álom és valóság (2015, ISBN 978-963-304-230-4)
- Akarat és odaadás (2015, ISBN 978-963-304-292-2)
- Félelem, düh, agresszió és szex (2016, ISBN 978-963-304-348-6)
- A rettenetes, a csodálatos (2016, ISBN 978-963-304-383-7)
- Credo (2017, ISBN 978-963-304-436-0)
- Ellenállás (2018, ISBN 978-963-304-565-7)
- Kapcsolatok könyve - Újabb útmutató tévelygőknek (2018, ISBN 978-963-304-691-3) – with Büky Dorottya
- Őszinteség (2019, ISBN 978-963-304-689-0)
- A cudar édesanya (2019, ISBN 978-963-304-804-7) – with Büky Dorottya
- Személyes és személytelen (HVG Könyvek, Bp., 2020, ISBN 978-963-304-952-5)
- A tudatállapotok szivárványa – revision for Andrew Feldmár's 80th birthday (HVG Könyvek, Bp., 2020, ISBN 978-963-304-959-4)
- Szabadság és szabad akarat – Idézetek könyve (HVG Könyvek Bp., 2021, ISBN 978-963-565-032-3)
- Másfél méter – Beszélgetések a szeretetről (HVG Könyvek Bp., 2021, ISBN 978-963-565-115-3) – with Büky Dorottya
- Agymosó – Őszinte kérdések és spontán válaszok (HVG Könyvek Bp., 2022, ISBN 978-963-565-242-6) – with Ács Dániel
- Nem szentírás! (HVG könyvek Bp., 2023, ISBN 978-963-565-407-9) – with Tóth László
- Credo: R. D. Laing and Radical Psychotherapy (Karnac Books, UK, 2023, ISBN 978-1-80013-244-3) – in English
- Radical Adventure: An Inquiry into Psychedelic Psychotherapy (Karnac Books, UK, 2025) - in English
- Diagnózisok homokozója (HVG Könyvek Bp, 2025, ISBN 9789635657162) – with Dr. Kröber Edith
- Feldmár András–Tóth László: Végtelen beszélgetés (HVG Könyvek Bp., 2026, ISBN 9789635658268)
- Radikale Abenteuer: Erfahrungen in der psychedelischen Therapie (Nachtschatten Verlag, 2026, ISBN 9783037887288) – in German

== Selected works (in English) ==
Publications

- Pylyshyn, Z.W., Feldmar, A.: Grammatical Category as Mediator. in Psychonom. Sci., 1968, Vol. 13.
- Minute Particulars and Bookworm (two regular columns) in Mental Patients' Association's publication In A NutShell
- The Embryology of Consciousness: What is a normal pregnancy? In The Psychological Aspects of Abortion, 1979
- Andrew Feldmar in R.D.Laing: Creative Destroyer, Bob Mullen (Ed.) London: Cassell, 1997, pp. 340 -368.
- Trickster Makes This World: Mischief, Myth and Art in Geist, 2000
- Entheogens and Psychotherapy in Janus Head, 2001
- Dr. Love and Mr. Death in The Erotic: Exploring Critical Issues, 2004
- Deleuze's Catch After His Surrender to Bacon in Janus Head, 2005
- Closed doors of perception in The Guardian, 2007
- Psychedelic drugs could heal thousands in The Guardian, 2008
- R. D. Laing and the Courage to Be in Saybrook University, 2013
- Love, will, and the hatred of reality in R.D. Laing: 50 Years Since The Divided Self, 2013
- On the Therapeutic Stance during Psychedelic Psychotherapy in Psychedelics and Psychotherapy: The Healing Potential of Expanded States, 2021
- Credo: R. D. Laing and Radical Psychotherapy (Karnac Books, UK, 2023, ISBN 978-1-80013-244-3)
- Radical Adventure: An Inquiry into Psychedelic Psychotherapy (Karnac Books, UK, 2025, ISBN 978-1-80013-305-1)
- What do you do when you don’t know what to do? By Andrew Feldmár (MAPS Bulletin, 2025)
- No Promises and No Goals By Andrew Feldmár (Psychedelics Today, 2026)

Interviews

- On Healing, CBC TV's Viewpoint (1975)
- 3-part CBC Radio's Ideas on R.D. Laing (1989)
- Whatever Became of Andrew Feldmar? (Vancouver Observer, 2009)
- Deconstructing Psychiatry (Vancouver Co-op Radio, 2011) the original recording is from 2004
- Father, Interpersonal Phenomenologist and Love Dealer – Interview with Andrew Feldmár (Twisted iDEAL, 2013)
- "Nobody suffers, nobody is crazy, if they weren't hurt." – Interview with Andrew Feldmár (SEX Magazine, 2014)
- Interview with Andrew Feldmar About Psychedelic-Assisted Psychotherapy (MAPS, 2014) listen the interview on Soundcloud
- The Rainbow States of Consciousness (Conscious Living Radio, 2014)
- A boldly honest conversation with Andrew Feldmár (Philosophy Magazine, 2018)
- Radical Therapy with Andrew Feldmar (MANTORSHIFT, 2023)
- Anna Dobos' interview with Andrew Feldmar (Manka Conversations, 2024)
- Back to the Roots | LIdija Martinovic Rekert' Interview with Andrew Feldmar (YouTube, 2024)
- Interview with Psychotherapist Andrew Feldmár (Any Dreams Last Night?, 2024)
- Psychotherapy with Andrew Feldmár (Drug Science Podcast, 2024)
- Andrew Feldmár: A trail of breadcrumbs to follow (Interviewed by Tara Behr and Jeremy Berger, 2025)
- Mia Kalef: On Evil

Videos

- Did You Used to Be R.D. Laing? (TV movie, 1989)
- Deconstructing Psychiatry (a movie by Cindy Lou Griffith, 2004)
- Andrew Feldmár - Lunar Eclipse -- A Life Worth Living (TEDxDanubia, 2011)
- Andrew Feldmár on the Colbert Report (2007)
- Andrew Feldmar: MDMA for PTSD (MAPS, 2012)
- The Psychedelic Apprentice - Andrew Feldmar (Psychedelic Science, 2013)
- From Neurons to Nirvana: The Great Medicines (2014) And here: https://www.youtube.com/watch?v=-2rrn_0uTro
- Andrew Feldmar: “Entheogens and Other Medicines for the Soul, for the Spirit, for Us.” (Spirit Plant Medicine Conference, UBC, 2014)
- Therapeutic Use of Psychedelics Overview & Personal Journey - Andrew Feldmar (Psychedelic Psychotherapy Forum, 2015)
- Andrew Feldmar on Psychedelic Therapy (Breaking Convention, 2015)
- Andrew Feldmar - LSD, MDMA, & Therapy (ChangeTruth, 2016)
- Andrew Feldmár on Psychotherapy (Feldmar Institute, 2016)
- Andrew Feldmár on Shame (Feldmar Institute, 2016)
- Andrew Feldmár on Dependancy [sic] and Emancipation (Feldmar Institute, 2016)
- Legalizing Psychedelic Medicine - Andrew Feldmar - Trust (MAPS Canada, 2017)
- The LSD Psychotherapists - King's Society for Psychedelic Studies 2017, London
- A lecture and Q&A by Andrew Feldmár at Depression Confessions (Vancouver, 2017)
- Andrew Feldmár: R. D. Laing - Existentialism & Buddhism (UBC, 2017)
- Andrew Feldmár: Portrait of a therapist (Asher Penn, 2019)
- The Psychedelic Society – Meetup 21: Andrew Feldmar on Entheogens & Radical Psychotherapy, 2020
- Andrew Feldmar: Radical Adventure – Prolegomena to Psychedelic Psychotherapy | The Maudsley Psychedelic Society, 2021
- Psychoanalysis and Psychedelics: The Inaugural Event, with Andrew Feldmár, Paul Zeal and Nathan Gorelick, 2021
- Let's talk about love - Andrew Feldmár - TEDxBudapestSalon, 2021
- 'They Promised You That The River Ain't Deep' - A short film by László Lenhardt, inspired by Andrew Feldmár, 2021
- Andrew Feldmar and Michel Odent – a conversation ('Do We Need Midwives?', YouTube, 2022)
- Andrew Feldmár's debut book in English: CREDO - online book launch event, 2023
- Andrew Feldmár – Psychedelic Assisted Therapy – Seminar for the APA, Humanistic Psychology Division (2023)
- Radical psychotherapy, Andrew Feldmár – SAFPAC Seminar Series (2025)
- An Inquiry Into Psychedelic Psychotherapy | Andrew Feldmár - Banyen Books & Sound (2025)
- Andrew Feldmar's 50 years of Guiding Psychedelic Journey's, A Warning (Radically Genuine, 2026)
- Andrew Feldmar - Radical Adventure (Psychedelics Today, 2026)
