= Saint Nearchus =

3rd century Armenian Christian martyr

- Born: Nearchus or Nearch (also written Neärchus or Neärch)
- Cause of death: Burned alive
- Feast: 22 April

Nearchus or Nearch (also written Neärchus or Neärch) was a third-century AD Armenian martyr and saint. He was a Roman army officer and friend of Polyeuctus, whom he had converted to the Christian faith. Nearchus was later burned alive. His feast day is on April 22.

== Saints Nearchus and Polyeuctus ==
Saints Nearchus and Polyeuctus were third-century Roman army officers in Armenia. Their saints’ story is told in Menalogion of Metaphrastes. Nearchus was Christian, but Polyeuctus was not. The men had a strong desire to spend eternity together, so Polyeuctus converted from paganism to Christianity. With a convert’s zeal he attacked a pagan procession. He was beheaded for his crime. Shortly before he was executed, he spoke his last words to Nearchus: “Remember our secret vow.” Nearchus was later burned alive.
