= Paulus (consul 496) =

Politician of the Eastern Roman Empire

Flavius Paulus (Latin: Paulus, Greek: Παῦλος; fl. 496) was an aristocrat of the Eastern Roman Empire.

== Family ==
Paulus was the brother of Anastasius I. His family was Illyrian.

== Life ==
In 496 he was appointed consul without a colleague. Paulus married Magna; together they had a daughter, Irene, who married Olybrius, a member of the House of Theodosius.

Political offices
Preceded by Viator	Consul of the Roman Empire; 496	Succeeded by Anastasius I
