= Church of St. Polyeuctus =

Byzantine church in Istanbul

Coordinates: 41.014°N 28.953°E

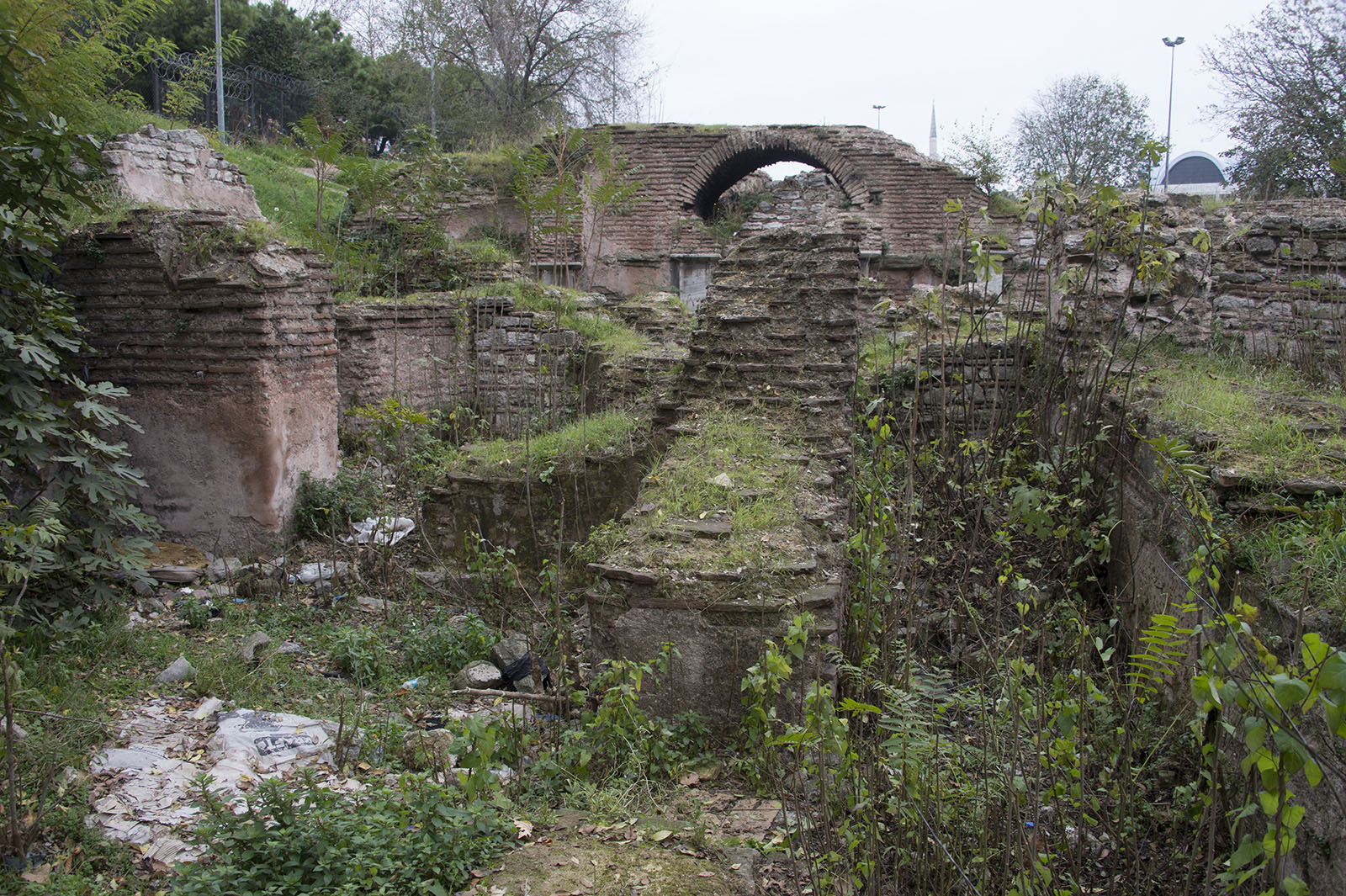
Church of St. Polyeuctus remains

The Church of St. Polyeuctus (Ancient Greek: Ἅγιος Πολύευκτος, romanized: Hagios Polyeuktos; Turkish: Ayios Polieuktos Kilisesi) was an ancient Byzantine church in Constantinople (now Istanbul, Turkey) built by the noblewoman Anicia Juliana and dedicated to Saint Polyeuctus. Intended as an assertion of Juliana's own imperial lineage, it was a lavishly decorated building, and the largest church of the city before the construction of the Hagia Sophia. It introduced the large-scale use of Sassanid Persian decorative elements, and may have inaugurated the new architectural type of domed basilica, perfected in the later Hagia Sophia.

Little is known of the church's history after its construction. The building survived until the 11th century, after which it fell into decay, while several architectural elements were removed and reused in Constantinople and other cities. After being built over in the Ottoman period, the site of the church was rediscovered during excavations in the 1960s. The area, directly opposite the Istanbul Metropolitan Municipality City Hall, is now a preserved archaeological site open to visitors, although the sculptures have been removed to the Istanbul Archaeological Museum.

== History ==
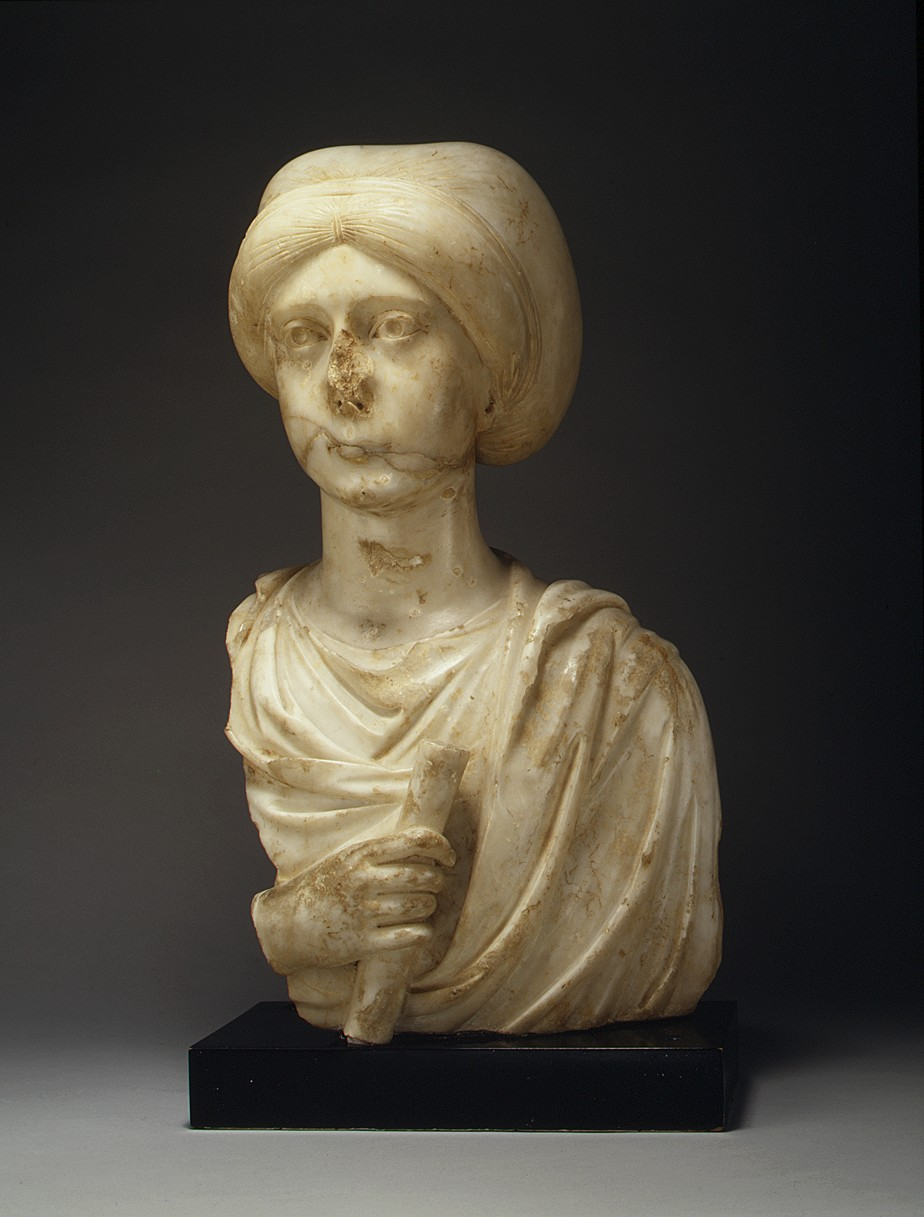
Marble bust of Anicia Juliana, from the New York Metropolitan Museum of Art.

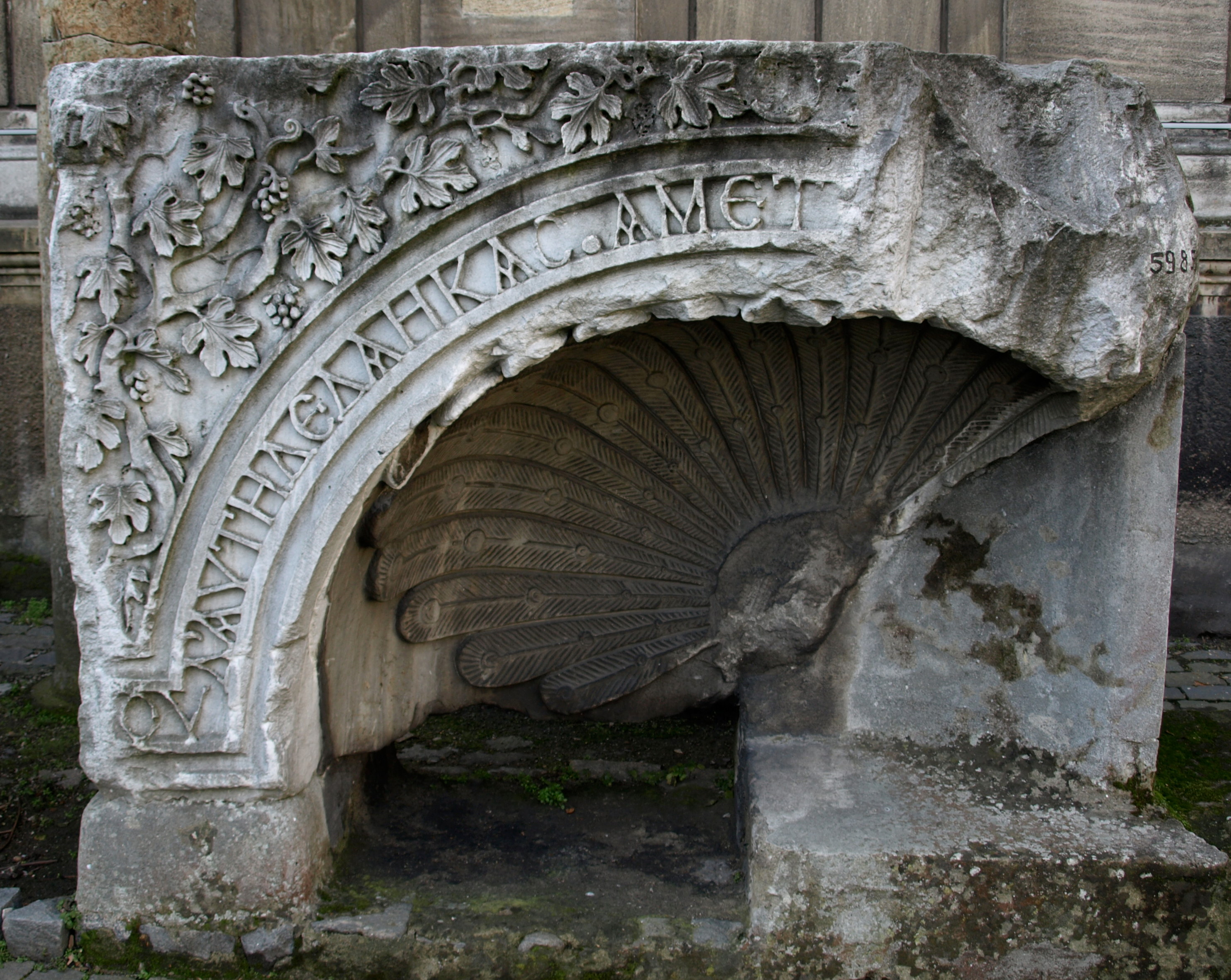
Fragment from the church's entablature, containing the beginning of the 31st line of the epigram celebrating the foundation of the church. Discovered in situ during the 1960 excavations.

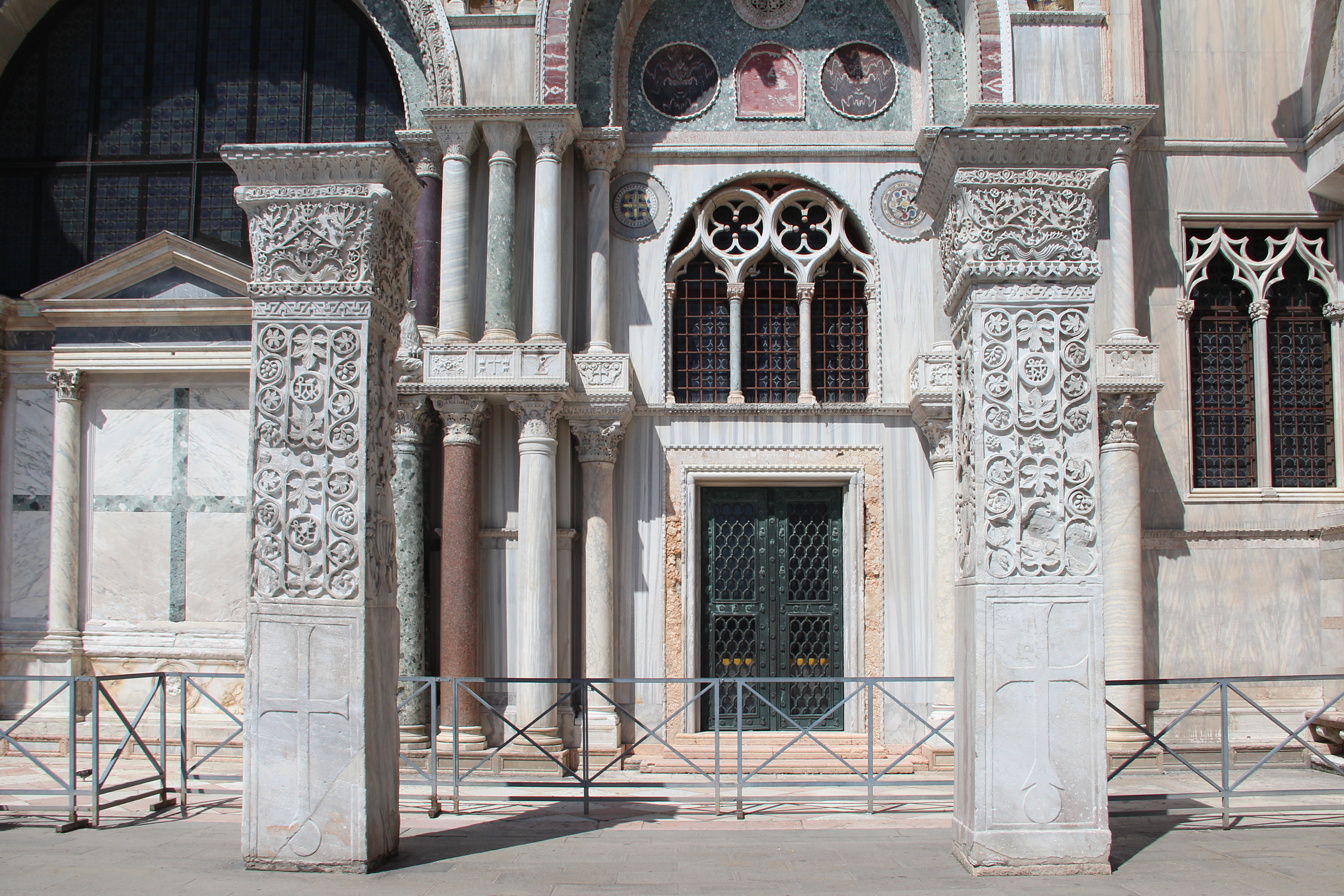
The Pilastri Acritani in Venice, taken from the Church of St. Polyeuctus.

The church was commissioned by the noblewoman Anicia Juliana, descendant of several Western emperors, and was constructed between 524 and 527, during the reign of Justin I (r. 518–527). It was meant to replace an earlier church, built by Eudocia, wife of Theodosius II and Juliana's great-grandmother, to enshrine the relic skull of Saint Polyeuctus. The new church was thought to have been the largest in Constantinople before the building of the Hagia Sophia by Justin's nephew and heir, Justinian I (r. 527–565).

In two laudatory epigrams (together 76 lines) inscribed on the walls of the church and preserved in its entirety in a medieval manuscript (Anthologia Graeca, I.10), Juliana compares herself to past emperors Constantine I and Theodosius II as a monumental builder, and claims to have surpassed Solomon's Temple, on whose proportions the new church was allegedly based. The building constituted thereby a direct challenge to the prestige and authority of the low-born reigning dynasty, and it may have been one of the reasons for the massive scale of Justinian's reconstruction of the Hagia Sophia a few years later. In light of this rivalry, it is perhaps no coincidence that Justinian too, when he beheld the completed Hagia Sophia, is said to have cried out: "Solomon, I have surpassed thee." The importance of the Solomonic allusions is however questioned by some scholars, who see the church more as a statement of the imperial prestige of the Old Roman aristocracy, from which Juliana descended, and of Chalcedonian orthodoxy, which she had championed during the reign of the Monophysite emperor Anastasius I (r. 491–518). A further aspect of the antagonism with Justinian however is evidenced by a tale recorded by Gregory of Tours: shortly after his accession, Justinian called upon the aged Juliana to contribute a part of her large fortune to the state treasury. After stalling for time, she had her gold melted down and fashioned into plates, with which she adorned the interior of the roof of the newly built church of St. Polyeuctus, thus preserving it from the emperor's avarice.

The church survived until the 11th century, when it was abandoned. Thereafter it was liberally plundered for sculptures and other architectural elements (spolia) by both the Byzantines and, after the sack of the city in 1204, by the Crusaders. Several pieces from St. Polyeuctus were reused in other sacral buildings of Constantinople/Istanbul, for example the Monastery of Christ Pantokrator (the modern Zeyrek Mosque), the Fenari Isa Mosque and the Koca Mustafa Pasha Mosque. But other parts of the architectural sculpture of the church was spread throughout the Mediterranean to places like Venice, Milan, Barcelona and Vienna (Kunsthistorisches Museum). The most famous examples are the so-called Pilastri Acritani ("Pillars of Acre") that stand at St Mark's Basilica, Venice, since the 13th century.

The site of the church, in the Saraçhane quarter (the ancient Constantinianae), was gradually occupied by houses and a mosque in the Ottoman period. In 1940, the area was leveled, and in 1960, during construction of the intersection of the Șehzadebași Caddesi and Atatürk Bulvari roads, excavations began. Brick vaults and pieces of Proconnesian marble sculpture were discovered, among them fragments of the monumental epigram adorning the church. These fragments, in conjunction with references to the approximate location of church in Byzantine texts concerning the imperial processions on the Mese avenue, allowed a secure identification. The site was extensively excavated between 1964 and 1969 by archaeologists under the direction of Dr. Nezih Firatli from the Istanbul Archaeological Museum and Martin Harrison of the Dumbarton Oaks Institute. The area, directly opposite the Istanbul Metropolitan Municipality City Hall, is now a preserved archaeological site open to visitors, although the sculptures have been removed to the Istanbul Archaeological Museum.

The remains of the church were damaged by homeless drug addicts who lit fires after cutting through the surrounding fence to sleep there.

== Description ==
Conjectural reconstruction of the interior by R.M. Harrison. The exedrae are visible on the left, the ambon and altar in the lower picture.

Despite its architectural prominence, very little is known of the church's history and its precise architecture. Most of the information on the church's original appearance is derived from the epigram in honour of Juliana and her family, which was inscribed in pieces in various parts of the church. The epigram claims that the church was laid out as a replica of the ancient Jewish Temple with the precise proportions given in the Bible for the Temple of Solomon, and using the royal cubit as a unit of measure, as in its model. Martin Harrison, the site's chief excavator, has reconstructed the church as a roughly square basilica, ca. 52 m long on the sides, with a central nave and two side aisles, fronted by a narthex and preceded by a large atrium of 26 m length. To the north of the atrium, remains of another building have been identified as either the church's baptistery or Juliana's palace. The atrium itself contained the first of the two epigrams of the church.

An oval substructure in the building's center indicates the position of the ambon, while strong foundations throughout the building indicate, according to Harrison, the presence of a dome, bringing the estimated height of the building to over 30 m. The area of the altar was not sufficiently excavated, and its shape remains unknown. The possible presence of a dome, although not universally accepted, is of major importance, since it would mean that it was St. Polyeuctus, and not Justinian's churches (Saints Sergius and Bacchus and the Hagia Sophia), which first combined the traditional basilica with a dome. From the epigram, we know that the interior featured two storeys with colonnades and galleries. Based on the epigram and the substructures, Harrison also posited the existence of a pair of two-storey exedrae, composed of three niches with a pier in between, on the northern and southern sides of the ambo. The spaces around the domed western bay would have been covered with barrel or cross-vaults.

The interior decoration was extraordinarily rich. The walls were decorated with marble, the roof was gilded, while the narthex featured a depiction of the baptism of Constantine the Great. Fragments of ivory, amethyst, gold and colored glass, originally inlaid in the marble sculptures, have also been found at the site, as well as fragments of mosaics. The deliberate evocation of the Solomonic Temple was further reinforced by the preponderance of motifs such as palm trees, pomegranates and lilies in the church's decoration. A notable characteristic, which has not been attested before in Constantinopolitan art and architecture, is the extensive use of Sassanid Persian decorative motifs such as friezes of running palmette and pomegranate leaves or symmetric geometric and vegetal patterns. Persian motifs became increasingly popular in the 6th century, and were also used in the decoration of the Hagia Sophia. Another exceptional find are ten relief plaques bearing the images of Christ, the Virgin Mary and the Apostles; such images are very rare due to the destruction of human representations in the Iconoclasm of the 8th and 9th centuries.

One of the largest decorative marble remains of the site is the niche-head pieces. These massive pieces of marble consist of a concave segment with a large frontal peacock carved in the center, tail fanned out proud. The second epigram of the church runs along the semicircle of the carving. Surrounding the peacocks are the spandrels filled with grape vines and leaves. The inscription's letters are raised 11 cm high, and surrounded by realistic grape vines. The detail involved in every individual leaf is remarkable. Each leaf has visible veins, some edges of the leaves are frayed and torn, and the artist even took the time to layer the design, pulling some leaves forward, and carving others in the background, giving the sense of depth. Martin Harrison notes that this workmanship is all done by the artist’s eye, and with no use of a constant measure, as indicated by the marks made by the chisel, minute irregularities, and slight bends in the lattice work. This area was originally painted in vibrant colors. The primary colors used were blues, greens, and some purples. These colors are difficult to find or make and show Anicia Juliana’s power in the decorative aspect of the structure. The background to vines and letters was a bright blue. The peacocks—associated with the goddess Hera and royalty in Antiquity and symbolizing renewal and rebirth for Christians —adorned with carved necklaces, were painted in blues, greens and gold. Due to the empty cavities in the eyes of the remaining bird head pieces, green glass was used for the pupils. They also held chains to suspend something. Connor suggests due to their location, a lamp is a believable use for the chains in their beaks.

== Gallery ==
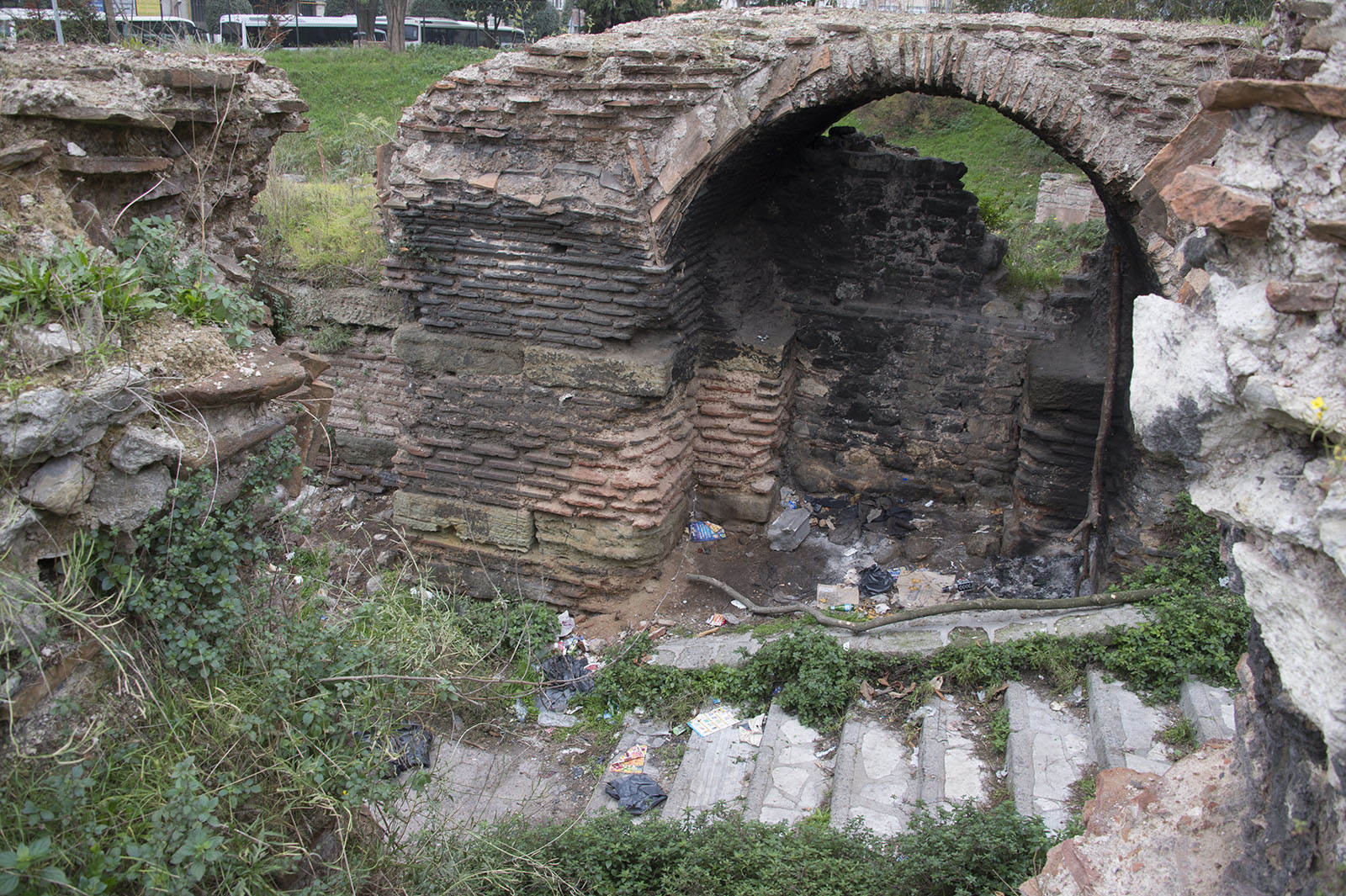
Church of St. Polyeuctus remains

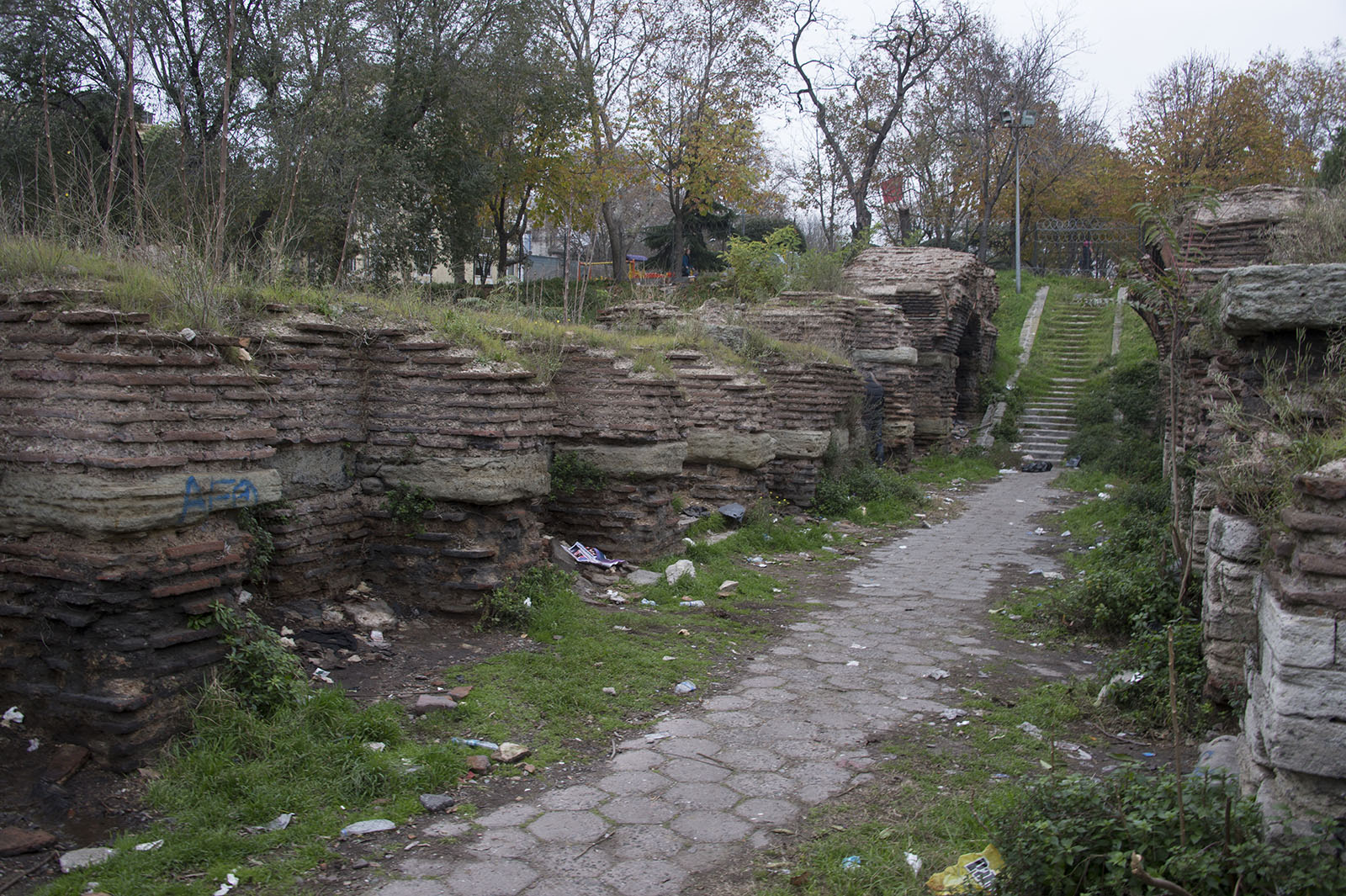
Church of St. Polyeuctus remains

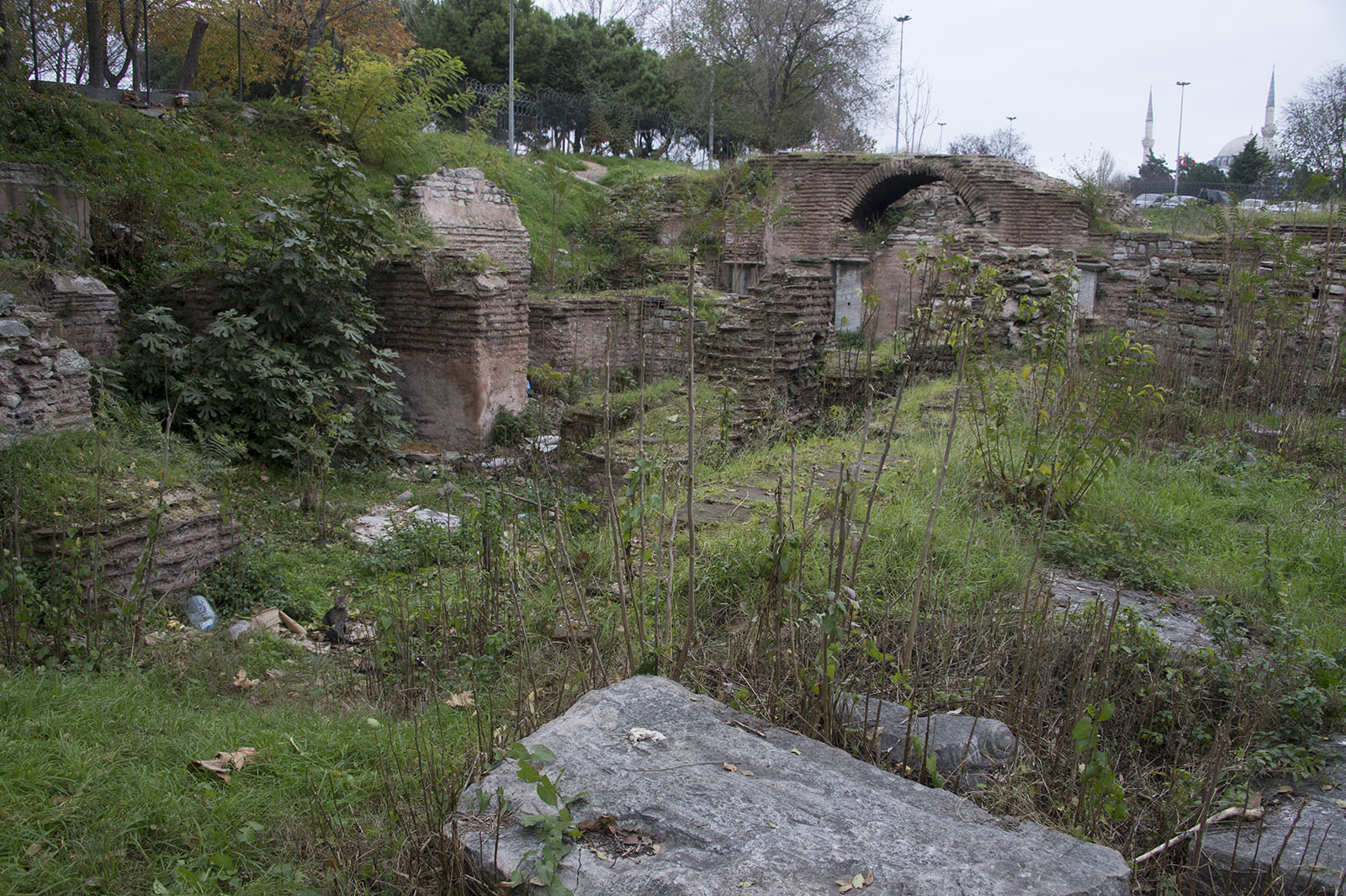
Church of St. Polyeuctus remains

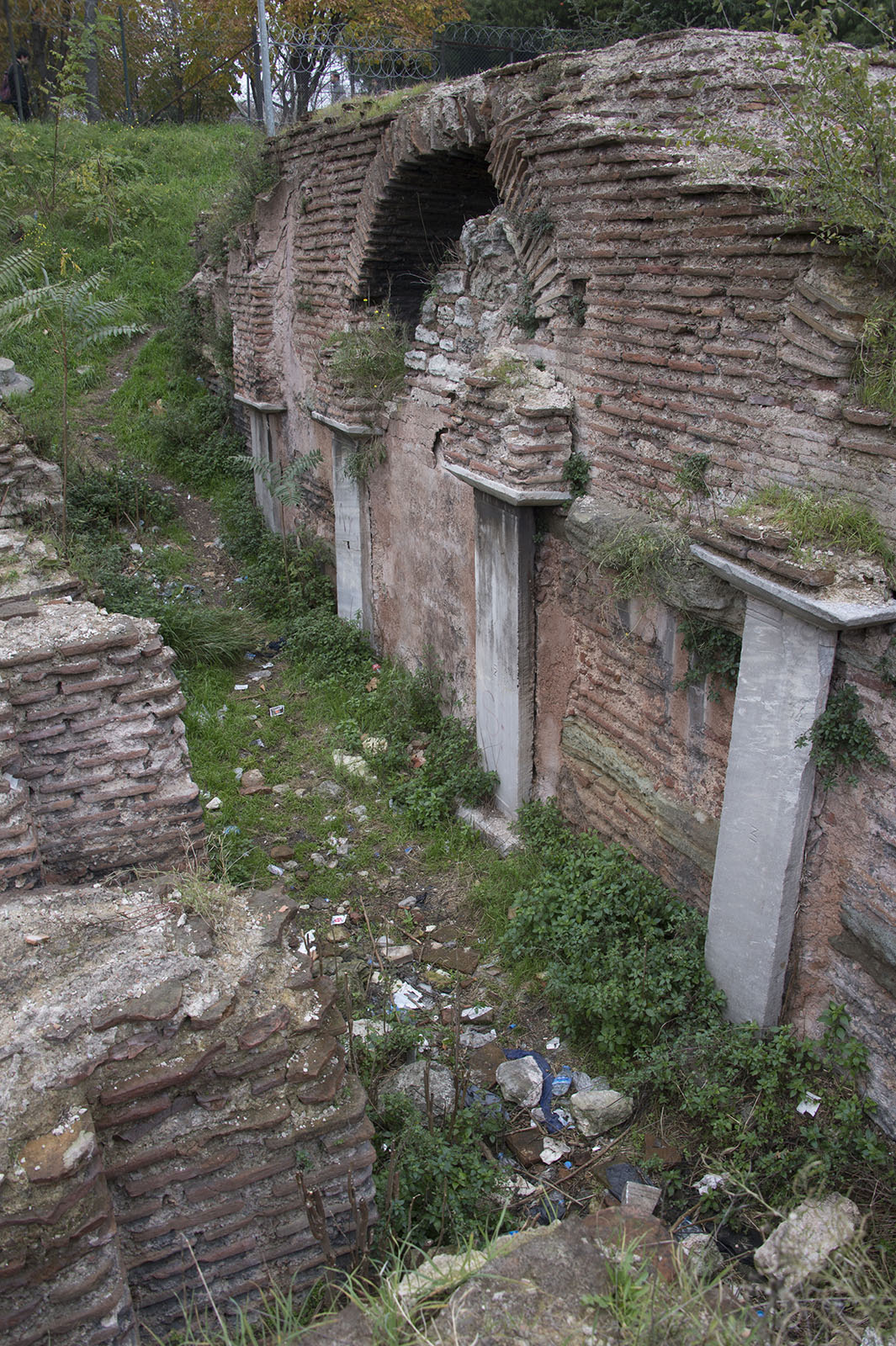
Church of St. Polyeuctus remains

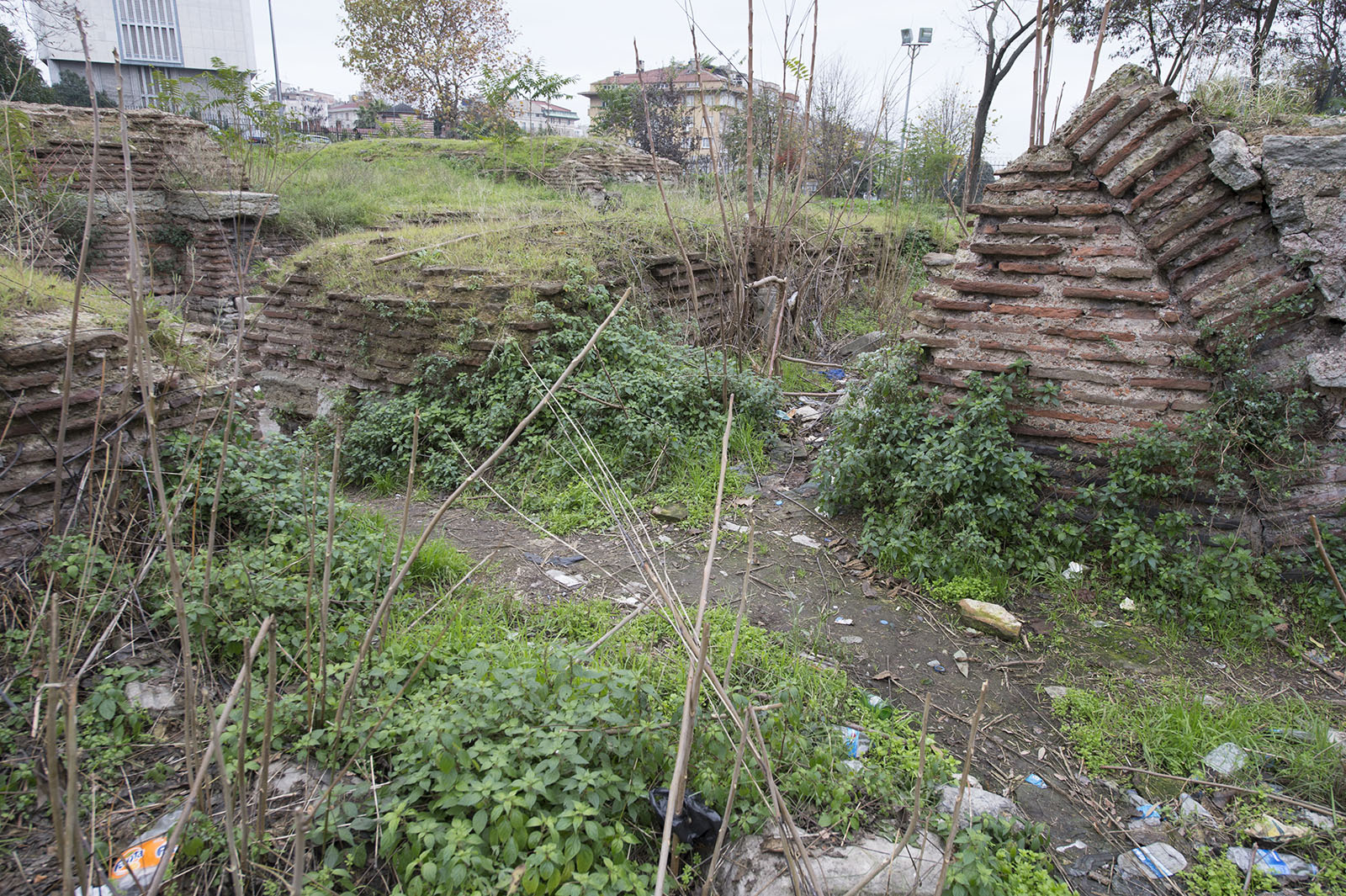
Church of St. Polyeuctus remains

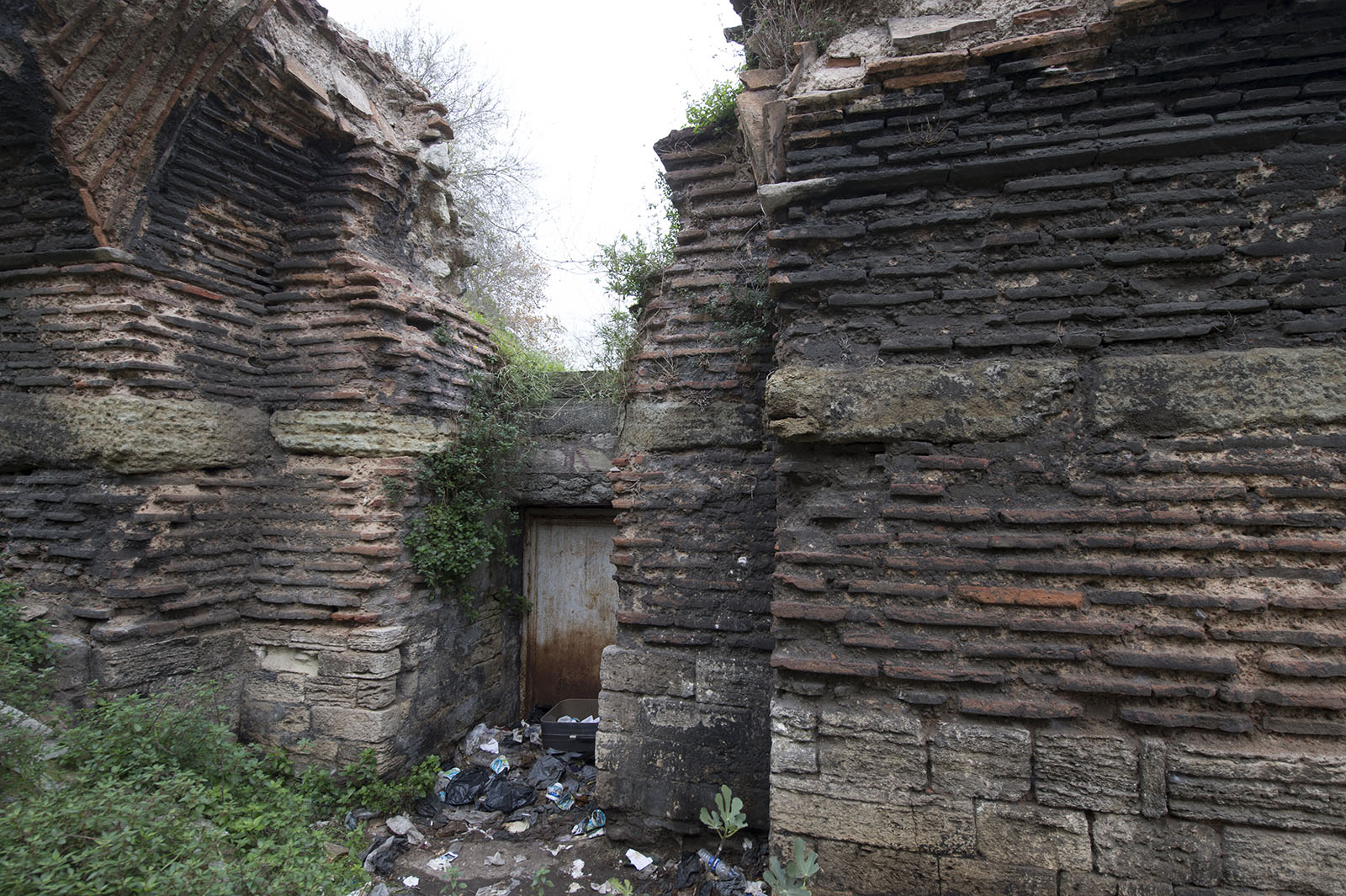
Church of St. Polyeuctus remains

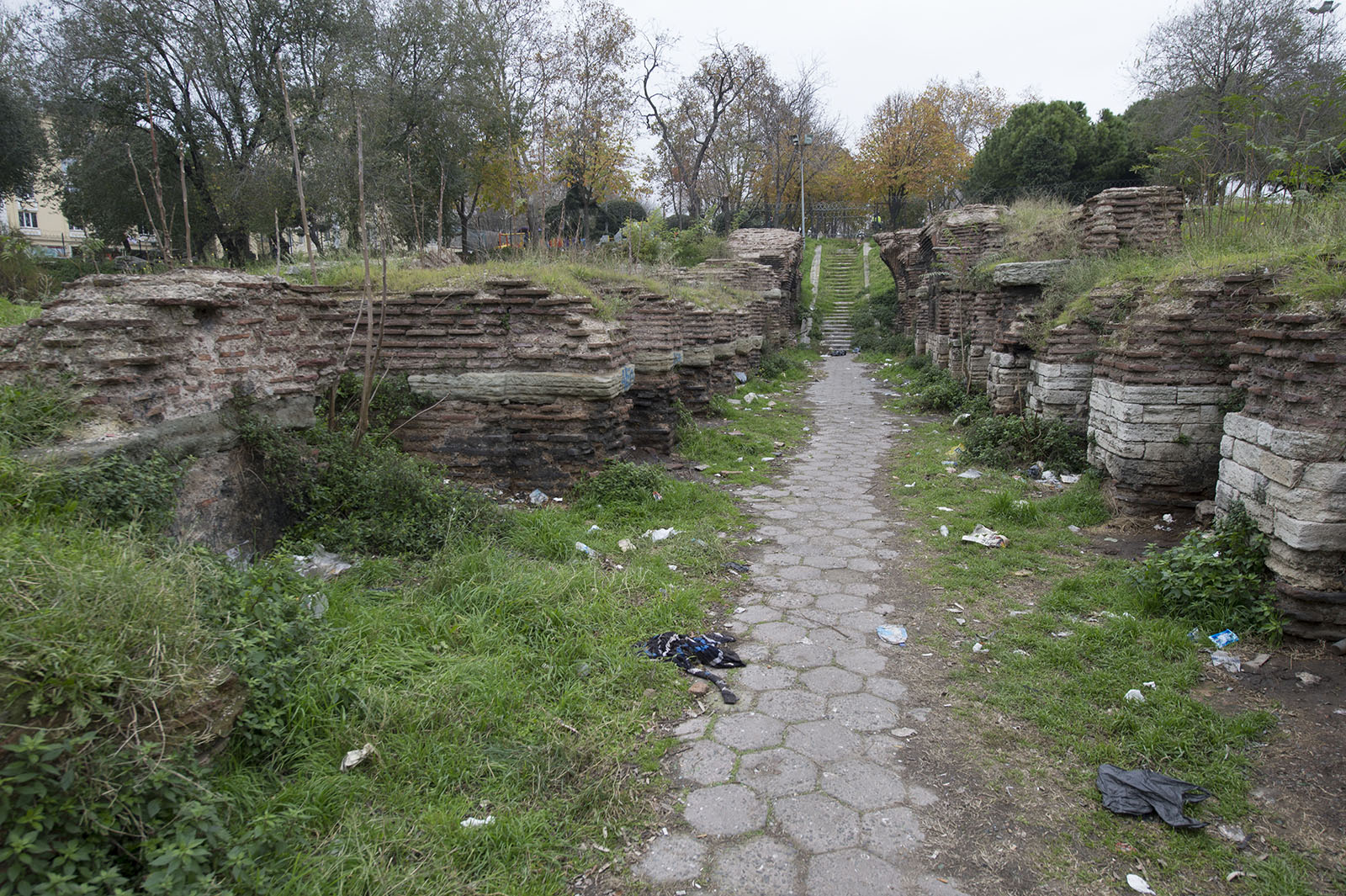
Church of St. Polyeuctus remains

== See also ==
- Ancient Roman and Byzantine domes

== Sources ==
- Cameron, Averil; Ward-Perkins, Bryan; Whitby, Michael (2000). Late Antiquity: Empire and Successors, AD 425-600. Cambridge University Press. ISBN 978-0-521-32591-2.
- Canepa, Matthew P. (2006). The Late Antique Kosmos of Power: International Ornament and Royal Identity in the Sixth and Seventh Centuries (PDF). 21st International Congress of Byzantine Studies. London. Archived from the original (PDF) on 2011-07-15.
- Connor, Carolyn L. (2004). Women of Byzantium. New Haven: Yale University Press. ISBN 9780300099577.
- Fiolitaki, Penelope (2008-04-01). "St. Polyeuktos". Encyclopedia of the Hellenic World: Constantinople.
- Hamblin, William J.; Seely, David Rolph (2007). Solomon's Temple: Myth and History. Thames and Hudson. ISBN 978-0-500-25133-1.
- Harrison, Richard Martin, ed. (2014). Excavations at Saraçhane in Istanbul. Vol. I. Princeton University Press. ISBN 978-1-400-85797-5.
- Harrison, Richard Martin (1989). A Temple for Byzantium: The Discovery and Excavation of Anicia Juliana's Palace Church in Istanbul. London: Harvey Miller. ISBN 978-0-292-78109-2.
- Kazhdan, Alexander, ed. (1991). Oxford Dictionary of Byzantium. Oxford University Press. ISBN 978-0-19-504652-6.
- Maas, Michael, ed. (2005). The Cambridge Companion to the Age of Justinian. Cambridge University Press. ISBN 978-0-521-52071-3.
- Mango, Cyril; Ševčenko, Ihor (1961). "Remains of the Church of St. Polyeuktos at Constantinople". Dumbarton Oaks Papers. 15. Dumbarton Oaks, Trustees for Harvard University: 243–247. doi:10.2307/1291183. JSTOR 1291183.
- Mitchell, Stephen (2007). A history of the later Roman Empire, AD 284-641: the transformation of the ancient world. Wiley-Blackwell. ISBN 978-1-4051-0857-7.
- Stroth, Fabian (2021). Monogrammkapitelle. Die justinianische Bauskulptur Konstantinopels als Textträger (in German). Wiesbaden: Reichert. ISBN 978-3-95490-272-9.
- Walter, Christopher (2003). The warrior saints in Byzantine art and tradition. Ashgate Publishing, Ltd. ISBN 978-1-84014-694-3.
