= Priscus =

5th-century Byzantine Greek historian and diplomat

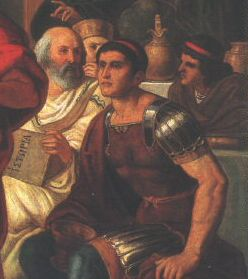
Priscus (left) with the Roman embassy at the court of Attila the Hun, holding his ΙΣΤΟΡΙΑ (History, which the painter has incorrectly spelled ΙΣΤΩΡΙΑ) (detail from Mór Than's Feast of Attila)

Priscus of Panium (/ˈprɪskəs/; Greek: Πρίσκος ὁ Πανίτης; 410s/420s AD – after 472 AD) was an Eastern Roman diplomat and Greek historian and rhetorician (or sophist).

== Biography ==
Priscus was born in Panion, in Thrace, between 410 and 420 AD. In 448/449 AD, he accompanied Maximinus, the head of the Byzantine embassy representing Emperor Theodosius II (r. 402–450), on a diplomatic mission to the court of Attila the Hun. While Priscus was there, he met and conversed with a Greek merchant, dressed in "Scythian" (or Hunnic) fashion, who had been captured eight years earlier (c. 441–442) when the city of Viminacium on the Danube, east of modern Belgrade, was sacked by the Huns. The trader explained to Priscus that after the sack of Viminacium, he was a slave of Onegesius, a Hunnic nobleman, but obtained his freedom and chose to settle among the Huns. Priscus ultimately engaged in a debate with the Greek defector regarding the qualities of life and justice in both the Byzantine Empire and in barbarian kingdoms.

After an interlude in Rome, Priscus traveled to Alexandria and the Thebaid in Egypt. He last appeared in the East, circa 456, attached to the staff of Euphemios as Emperor Marcian's (r. 450–457) magister officiorum. He died after 472 AD.

=== History of Byzantium ===
Priscus was the author of an eight-volume historical work written in Greek and known as the History of Byzantium (Greek: Ἱστορία Βυζαντιακή), though that was probably not the original title. When it was complete, the History probably covered the period from the accession of Attila the Hun to the accession of Emperor Zeno (r. 474–475), or from 433 to 474 AD, but Priscus's work currently survives only in fragments. It was very influential in the Byzantine Empire: it was used in the Excerpta de Legationibus of Emperor Constantine VII Porphyrogenitus (r. 913–959), as well as by authors such as Evagrius Scholasticus, Cassiodorus, Jordanes, and the author of the Souda. Priscus's writing style is straightforward, and his work is regarded as a reliable contemporary account of Attila the Hun, his court, and the reception of the Roman ambassadors. He is considered a "classicizing" historian, to the extent that his work, though it was written during the Christian era, is almost completely secular, and relies on a style and word choices that are part of an historiographical tradition dating back to the fifth century BC.

=== Priscus's account of a dinner with Attila the Hun ===
Priscus recounted the story of a dinner with Attila the Hun which took place at one of Attila's many houses. This house was said to be greater than the rest (having been made for celebration) due to it being constructed of decorative polished wood, with little thought to making any part of the place for defense. The dinner was at three o’clock; Priscus entered the house bearing gifts to Attila's wife; her name was Kreka and she had three sons. Priscus and the embassy of Eastern Romans were placed at the end of the table farthest from Attila but still in his presence; this was meant to show that he was greater than the Roman guests, and that Attila considered his people to be more important than Priscus and the Roman embassy. As Priscus and the Eastern Roman embassy stood, they followed the cultural tradition of being served tea from the cupbearers; they were to pray and have a drink before having a seat at the table. The seats were arranged parallel to the walls; Attila sat on the middle couch. The right side of Attila was reserved for his honored chiefs, and everyone else including Priscus and the Roman embassies sat on the left. After being seated, everyone raised a glass to pledge one another with wine. Once the cupbearers left another attendant came in with a platter of meat, followed by bread and other foods of the time. All of the food was served onto plates of silver and gold. Priscus also notes that Attila didn't use any silver or gold plates but instead used a cup made of wood; also, his attire was not very grand. Once the first round was finished, they stood and drank again to the health of Attila. When evening arrived torches were lit and songs of Attila's victories were sung.

Priscus's mission to Attila was not successful and was marked by several odd incidents which only made sense to him in retrospect. It turned out that, unknown to his party, he and his mission were sent to Attila as essentially a cover operation to provide a respectable front while Constantinople worked behind the scenes to bribe one of Attila's advisors to assassinate the Hun leader. This became known to Attila and informed his dealings with Priscus's group of ambassadors.

=== Priscus in fiction ===
Priscus is an important character in Slave of the Huns by Geza Gardonyi. He is depicted as a kindly master and scholar, and part of the novel is based on his account of his visit to Attila.

He is not to be confused with Priscus of Epirus, who lived in the 4th century and is one of two main interlocutors in Gore Vidal's novel Julian.

== Remaining works ==
The remaining works of Priscus are currently published in four collections:

- Given, John (2014). The Fragmentary History of Priscus. Merchantville, New Jersey: Evolution Publishing. ISBN 978-1-935228-14-1.
- Blockley, Roger C. (2009). The Fragmentary Classicising Historians of the Later Roman Empire. Vol. II. Cambridge, United Kingdom: Francis Cairns. ISBN 978-0-905205-51-9.
- Gordon, Colin Douglas (1966). The Age of Attila: Fifth-century Byzantium and the Barbarians. Ann Arbor, Michigan: University of Michigan Press. ISBN 9780472061112.
- Dindorfius, Ludovicus (1870). Historici Graeci Minores (Volume 1). Leipzig, Germany: B. G. Teubneri.
