= Maximinus (diplomat) =

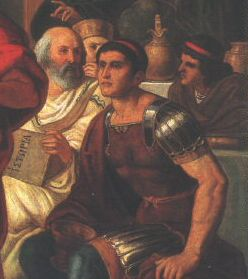
Priscus (left) with the Roman embassy at the court of Attila

Maximinus (Greek: Μαξιμίνος) was a 5th-century East Roman official, serving as ambassador to Attila the Hun and as a senior minister at Constantinople.

Maximinus was lieutenant of Ardaburius in the Roman–Persian war in 422. In 448, Theodosius II (r. 402–450) sent him to Attila; Orestes and Edeko, the Hunnic ambassadors at Constantinople, returned with him to Pannonia. Edeko had been bribed by the emperor's chief minister, Chrysaphius, to murder Attila, but on his arrival in Pannonia informed his master of the plot, of which Maximinus was totally ignorant. Attila was well aware of this and consequently turned his resentment only against the emperor and his minister, disdaining even to punish Vigilius, who was the entire promoter of the scheme, and who was entrapped in his turn by Attila. This embassy of Maximinus is described by his secretary, Priscus, to whom is owed nearly all modern knowledge of Attila's person and private life.

Afterwards, Maximinus became one of the four principal ministers of the emperor Marcian (r. 450–457) and in later years held the supreme command in Egypt whence he made a successful campaign against the Ethiopians. He is invariably represented as a virtuous, firm, and highly talented man. (Priscus, p. 39, 40, 48–70; Socrat. Hist. Eccles., vii. 20; Priscus.)

== Maximinus in fiction ==
Maximinus is a minor character in Slave of the Huns by Geza Gardonyi, where he is depicted as treating his slaves badly.
