= Late Greek =

Historical writings in the Greek language

Late Greek refers to writings in the Greek language in Late Antiquity and the Early Byzantine period; and in other words, from about the late 2nd century AD until about the late 7th century AD. The intellectual center of Late Greek was Alexandria in Egypt. Alexandria came under Arab rule starting in the 640s AD, which is sometimes taken as the ending-point of the Late Greek period. In terms purely of linguistics and language style, writings in Late Greek were conservative, whereas style began to change during the 8th century to some extent, and hence the ending-point of Late Greek is sometimes put at the beginning of the 8th century.

Notable examples of Late Greek writers include Clement of Alexandria (died c. 215), Galen (died c. 216), Origen (died c. 254), Diophantus (died c. 290), Porphyry (died c. 305), Zosimos of Panopolis (died c. 325), and many others. See the article Byzantine literature for more.

The term Late Latin covers very roughly the same time period in the Latin language.

== See also ==
- Koine Greek
