= Battle of the Catalaunian Plains =

Part of the Hunnic invasion of the Roman province of Gaul

- Part of the Hunnic invasion of Gaul and Fall of the Western Roman Empire
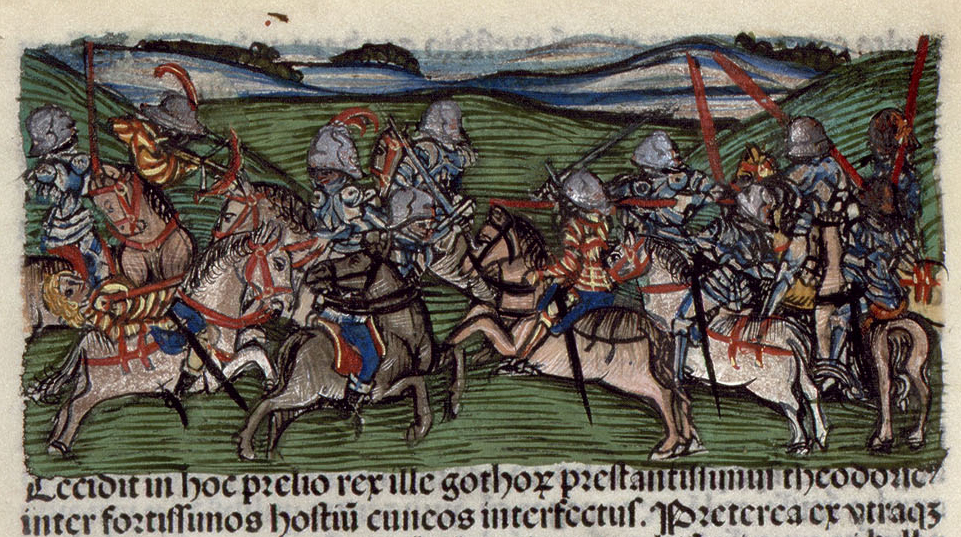
- The Battle of the Catalaunian Plains as depicted in the Chronica Hungarorum
Date	20 June 451 AD
Location	Around Champagne-Ardenne, northeastern France 49°00′N 4°30′E
Result	Inconclusive (See Outcome)

Belligerents
Western Roman Empire; Visigoths; Salian Franks; Ripuarian Franks; Burgundians; Saxons; Armoricans; Alans; Olibrones	Hunnic Empire; Amali Goths; Rugii; Sciri; Thuringi; Franks; Gepids; Burgundians; Heruli

Commanders and leaders
Flavius Aetius; Theodoric †; Sangiban; Thorismund; Merovech	Attila; Valamir; Thiudimer; Videmir; Ardaric; Childeric I; Laudaricus †

Strength
Modern estimates vary: see § Forces	Modern estimates vary: see § Forces

Map showing the possible routes taken by Attila's forces as they invaded Gaul, and the major cities that the Huns and their allies sacked or threatened

The Battle of the Catalaunian Plains (or Fields), also called the Battle of the Campus Mauriacus, Battle of Châlons, Battle of Troyes or the Battle of Maurica, took place on 20 June 451 AD, pitting a coalition led by the Roman general Flavius Aetius and the Visigothic king Theodoric I against the Huns and their vassals, commanded by their king, Attila. It proved to be one of the last major military operations of the Western Roman Empire, although Germanic foederati composed the majority of the coalition army. The exact strategic significance is disputed. Historians generally agree that the siege of Aurelianum was the decisive moment in the campaign and stopped the Huns' attempt to advance any further into Roman territory or establish vassals in Roman Gaul. However, the Huns looted and pillaged much of Gaul and crippled the military capacity of the Romans and Visigoths. Attila died only two years later, in 453. After the Battle of Nedao in 454, the coalition of the Huns and the incorporated Germanic vassals gradually disintegrated.

== Prelude ==
By 450 AD, the Romans had restored their authority in much of the province of Gaul, although control over all of the provinces beyond Italy was continuing to diminish. Armorica was only nominally part of the empire, and Germanic tribes occupying Roman territory had been forcibly settled and bound by treaty as foederati under their own leaders. Northern Gaul between the Rhine north of Xanten and the Lys (Germania Inferior) had unofficially been abandoned to the Salian Franks. The Visigoths on the Garonne were growing restive, but still holding to their treaty. The Burgundians in Sapaudia were more submissive, but likewise awaiting an opening for revolt. The Alans on the Loire and in Valentinois were more loyal, having served the Romans since the defeat of Jovinus in 411 and the Siege of Bazas in 414. The parts of Gaul still securely in Roman control were the Mediterranean coastline; a region including Aurelianum (present-day Orléans) along the Seine and the Loire as far north as Soissons and Arras; the middle and upper Rhine to Cologne; and downstream along the Rhône.

The historian Jordanes states that Attila was enticed by the Vandal king Genseric to wage war on the Visigoths. At the same time, Genseric would attempt to sow strife between the Visigoths and the Western Roman Empire. (Note: The Getica (or "Gothic History"), our principal source for this battle, is the work of Jordanes, who acknowledges that his work is based on Cassiodorus's own Gothic History, written between 526 and 533. However, the philologist Theodor Mommsen argued that Jordanes's detailed description of the battle was copied from lost writings of the Greek historian Priscus. It is available in an English translation by Charles Christopher Mierow, The Gothic History of Jordanes (Cambridge: Speculum Historiale, 1966, a reprint of the 1915 second edition); all quotations of Jordanes are taken from this edition, which is in the public domain.) However, Jordanes's account of Gothic history is notoriously unreliable. (Note: Connor Whately notes that Jordanes's entire work may in fact be a political statement on the campaigns of Belisarius and the policies of Justinian, who also considers the Battle of Chalons to be the climax of the piece. Barnish thinks it was used to portray Theodoric the Great as the new Aetius and Clovis as the new Attila. Hyun Jin Kim suggests the account is an allusion to the Battle of Marathon and severely distorted to fit Herodotus's narrative format. Therefore, any claims by Jordanes must be rigorously scrutinised, and the possibility that his entire account may be fabricated cannot be excluded.) Modern scholars believe that this explanation was Jordanes projecting contemporary events and political opinions onto Attila's time, and it was likely not original to Priscus. Christiensen points out that Amalafrida, wife of Thrasamund, was imprisoned and murdered by Hilderic after Thrasamund's death in 523, and that the tale of the blinding of Theodoric's daughter by Huneric was a fabrication.

Other contemporary writers offer different motivations: Justa Grata Honoria, the sister of the emperor Valentinian III, had been betrothed to the former consul Bassus Herculanus the year before. In 450, she sent the eunuch Hyacinthus to the Hunnic king asking for Attila's help in escaping her confinement, with her ring as proof of the letter's legitimacy. Allegedly, Attila interpreted it as offering her hand in marriage, and he had claimed half of the empire as a dowry. He demanded Honoria to be delivered along with the dowry. Valentinian rejected these demands, and Attila used it as an excuse to launch a destructive campaign through Gaul. (Note: A modern narrative based on these sources can be found in Thompson, Edward Arthur (1996) [1948] The Huns. Oxford: Wiley-Blackwell. pp. 144–148. This is a posthumous revision by Peter Heather of Thompson's A History of Attila and the Huns, originally published in 1948.) Ian Hughes suggests that the reality of this interpretation should be that Honoria was using Attila's status as honorary magister militum for political leverage.

Another conflict leading into the war was that in 449, the King of the Franks (possibly Chlodio) had died and that his two sons argued over the succession: while the older son sought Attila's help, the younger sided with Aetius, who adopted him. The identity of the younger prince, who was seen at Rome by the historian Priscus, remains unclear, though both Merowech and Childeric I have been suggested.

Attila crossed the Rhine early in 451 with his followers and a large number of allies, sacking Divodurum (now Metz) on 7 April. Schultheis notes, however, that the sacking of Metz may have been a literary trope used by Hydatius and Gregory of Tours to emphasise Attila's pagan nature to a Christian audience and may not be reliable. Other cities attacked can be determined by the hagiographies written to commemorate their bishops: Nicasius was slaughtered before the altar of his church in Reims; Servatius is alleged to have saved Tongeren with his prayers, as Genevieve is to have saved Lutetia. Lupus, bishop of Troyes, is also credited with saving his city by meeting Attila in person. (Note: The various hagiographies are summarized in Hodgkin, Thomas (1967) [1880–1889] Italy and Her Invaders, Vol. II, New York: Russell & Russell. pp. 128ff.) Many other cities also claim to have been attacked in these accounts, although archaeological evidence shows no destruction layer dating to the time of the invasion. The most likely explanation for Attila's widespread devastation of Gaul is that Attila's main column followed the Roman roads and crossed the Rhine at Argentoratum (Strasbourg) before marching to Borbetomagus (Worms), Mogontiacum (Mainz), Augusta Treverorum (Trier), Divodurum (Metz), Durocotorum (Reims), and finally Aurelianum (Orléans), while sending a small detachment north into Frankish territory to plunder the countryside. This explanation would support the literary evidence claiming North Gaul was attacked, and the archaeological evidence showing major population centres were not sacked.

Attila's army had reached Aurelianum (modern Orléans, France) before June. According to Jordanes, the Alan king Sangiban, whose foederati realm included Aurelianum, had promised to open the city gates. This siege is confirmed by the account of the Vita S. Aniani and in the later account of Gregory of Tours, although Sangiban's name does not appear in their accounts. However, the inhabitants of Aurelianum shut their gates against the advancing invaders, and Attila besieged the city, while he waited for Sangiban to deliver on his promise. There are two different accounts of the siege, and Hughes suggests that combining them provides a better understanding of what actually happened. After four days of heavy rain, Attila began his final assault on 14 June, which was broken off due to the approach of the Roman coalition. Modern scholars tend to agree that the siege was the high point of Attila's attack on the West, and the staunch Alan defence of the city was the real decisive factor in the war of 451. Contrary to Jordanes, the Alans were never planning to defect as they were the loyal backbone of the Roman defence in Gaul.

== Forces ==
Both armies consisted of combatants from many peoples. Besides the Roman troops, the Alans, and the Visigoths, Jordanes lists Aetius's allies as including the Francii, Sarmatae, Armoriciani, Liticiani, Burgundiones, Saxones, Riparii, and Olibrones (whom he describes as "once Roman soldiers and now the flower of the allied forces"), as well as "other Celtic or German tribes." The Liticiani could be either Laeti or Romano-Britons, the latter of which are recorded by Gregory. Guy Halsall argues that the Rhine limitanei and the old British field army composed the forces of the Riparii and Armoricans, and Peter Heather suggests that the Visigoths may have been able to field about 25,000 men total. John F. Drinkwater adds that a faction of Alemanni may have participated in the battle, possibly on both sides like the Franks and Burgundians. The Olibrones remain unknown, although it has been suggested these were Germanic limitanei garrisons. Schultheis argues that on paper, the Germanic federates could theoretically number more than 70,000, but likely numbered under 50,000.

A sense of the size of the actual Roman army may be found in the study of the Notitia Dignitatum by A. H. M. Jones. This document is a list of officials and military units that was last updated in the first decades of the fifth century. The Notitia Dignitatum lists 58 regular units, and 33 limitanei serving either in the Gallic provinces or on the frontiers nearby; the total of these units, based on Jones's analysis, is 34,000 for the regular units and 11,500 for the limitanei, or just under 46,000 all told. This figure is an estimate for the years 395–425 and one that changes with new research. The loss of the Western Roman provinces in North Africa resulted in the loss of funding for 40,000 infantry and 20,000 cavalry in the Roman army, in addition to previous losses, which was enough to permanently cripple Roman military capacity after 439 AD. According to Herwig Wolfram, with an annual revenue of 40,000 pounds of gold in 450 AD, the Western Empire would have had to spend almost two thirds of its income to maintain an army of 30,000 men. Hugh Elton gives the same figure in 450, but estimates the cost of maintaining an army of 300,000 at 31,625 lbs. of gold or 7.6 solidi a year per soldier. He states that there were also other unquantifiable military costs such as defensive installations, equipment, supplies, paper, animals and other costs. The size of the army in 450 AD therefore must have been significantly reduced from its status in the late 420s. Schultheis argues that the Roman field army as calculated from his own estimates of the Notitia Dignitatum, chronology of military losses, and income losses numbered approximately 20,500 comitatenses and 18,000 limitanei by the time of the battle, not including supernumerary officers.

Jordanes's list for Attila's allies includes the Gepids under their king Ardaric, as well as an army of various Gothic groups led by the brothers Valamir, Theodemir (the father of the later Ostrogothic king Theodoric the Great) and Videmir, scions of the Amali Goths. Sidonius Apollinaris offers a more extensive list of allies: Rugians, Gepids, Geloni, Burgundians, Sciri, Bellonoti, Neuri, Bastarnae, Thuringians, Bructeri, and Franks living along the River Neckar. E. A. Thompson expresses his suspicions that some of these names are drawn from literary traditions rather than from the event,

The Bastarnae, Bructeri, Geloni and Neuri had disappeared hundreds of years before the time of the Huns, while the Bellonoti had never existed at all: presumably the learned poet was thinking of the Balloniti, a people invented by Valerius Flaccus nearly four centuries earlier.

On the other hand, Thompson believes that the presence of Burgundians on the Hunnic side is credible, noting that a group is documented remaining east of the Rhine; he believes that the other peoples Sidonius mentions (the Rugians, Sciri, and Thuringians) were participants in this battle. Although there is no direct evidence that Heruli were present, as indirect evidence, centuries later Paulus Diaconus listed the subject peoples Attila could call upon in addition to the better known Goths and Gepids: "Marcomanni, Suebi, Quadi, and alongside them the Herules, Thuringi and Rugii".

Thompson remarks in a footnote, "I doubt that Attila could have fed an army of even 30,000 men". Lindner argues that by crossing the Carpathians to the area of modern Hungary the Huns had forfeited their best logistic base and grazing grounds, and that the Great Hungarian Plain could only support 15,000 mounted nomads. Schultheis notes that Attila had control of other Hunnic groups east of the Carpathians, and proposes the eastern half of Attila's empire could field an additional 7,000 to 12,000 men based on later 6th century sources. Kim notes that the Huns continued to use the Xiongnu decimal system, meaning their army was probably organised into divisions of 10, 100, 1000, and 10,000, but no real estimates of Hunnic military capacity can be determined. Their barbarian allies do receive mentions at other times in other sources: in 430 CE. The Hunnish king Octar was defeated by a force of 3,000 Neckar Burgundians who would later come under Hun subjugation, and Heather estimates that the Gepids and the Amali Goths could have each fielded a maximum of 15,000 men at the Battle of Nedao in 454. Schultheis argues that when combining primary and secondary source estimates Attila's forces would number more than 100,000 on paper, but were likely closer to 70,000. The Chronicon Paschale, which preserves an extremely abbreviated and garbled fragment of Priscus's account of the campaign, states that Attila's forces numbered in the tens of thousands. Assuming that the Hunnic and Germanic forces were roughly the same size as the Roman and federate army, those involved in the battle could have been well in excess of 100,000 combatants in total. This excludes the inevitable servants and camp followers who usually escape mention in the primary sources.

== Site of the Catalaunian Plains ==
The actual location of the Catalaunian Plains has long been considered unclear. The current scholarly consensus is that there is no conclusive site, merely being that it is in the vicinity of Châlons-en-Champagne (formerly called Châlons-sur-Marne) or Troyes. Historian Thomas Hodgkin located the site near Méry-sur-Seine. A more recent evaluation of the location has been performed by Phillippe Richardot, who proposed a location of La Cheppe, slightly north of the modern town of Châlons.

In 1842, at Pouan-les-Vallées, a village on the south bank of the river Aube, a labourer uncovered a burial containing a skeleton, a number of jewels and gold ornaments, and two swords. By the nature of its grave goods, it was initially thought to be the burial of Theodoric, but Hodgkin expressed scepticism, suggesting that this elite burial was that of a princely Germanic warrior who had lived in the fifth century. The Treasure of Pouan is conserved in the Musée des beaux-arts de Troyes. It is still not known whether the find is related to the battle.

In 2015, Simon MacDowall proposed the battle took place at Montgueux just west of Troyes. MacDowall goes as far as to identify the Roman alliance's camp site being placed at Fontvannes, a few kilometres west of the proposed battlefield, and places Attila's camp on the Seine at Saint-Lyé. This draws on the earlier work of M. Girard, who was able to identify Maurica as the "les Maures" ridge of Montgueux, based on the second Additamenta Altera to Prosper's Epitoma Chronicon, which states it took place five Roman miles from Tecis or Tricasses, the modern Troyes. The road in the region is known as the "Voie des Maures", and the base of the ridge is known as "l'enfer" to the locals. A small stream near the battlefield that runs to Troyes is known as "la Riviere de Corps" to this day. According to MacDowall, modern maps continue to identify the plains in the region as the "les Maurattes." Iaroslav Lebedynsky argued the battle likely stretched across the plain from Montgueux south to Tourvellieres, while Schultheis argues that the battle took place wholly on the "les Maures" ridge itself until its final phase, when retreating and pursuing forces stretched across several kilometres. The ridge at Montgueux is currently the most thoroughly researched proposal for the battlefield location.

== Battle ==
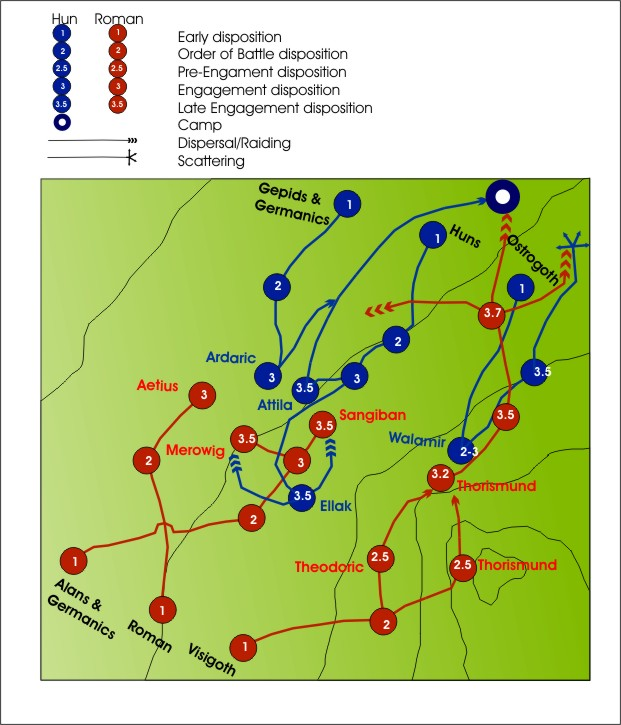
Course of the battle

Upon learning of the invasion, the magister utriusque militiae Flavius Aetius moved his army rapidly from Italy to Gaul. According to Sidonius Apollinaris, he was leading a force consisting of "few and sparse auxiliaries without one regular soldier." The insignificant number of Roman troops reported is probably due to the fact the majority of Aetius's army was stationed in Gaul, combined with Sidonius's need to embellish the account in favour of Avitus. Aetius immediately attempted to persuade Theodoric I, king of the Visigoths, to join him. Allegedly, Theodoric learned how few troops Aetius had with him and decided it was wiser to wait and oppose the Huns in his own lands, so Aetius then turned to the former Praetorian Prefect of Gaul, Avitus, for help. According to tradition, Avitus was not only able to persuade Theodoric to join the Romans, but also a number of other wavering barbarian residents in Gaul. The coalition assembled at Arelate (Arles) before moving to meet the Goths at Tolosa (Toulouse), and the army was supplied by Tonantius Ferreolus, who had been preparing for a Hunnic attack for a few years. The combined army then marched to Aurelianum (present-day Orléans), reaching that city on 14 June.

From Aurelianum, Aetius and his coalition pursued Attila, who was leaving Gaul with the majority of his objectives completed. According to Jordanes, the night before the main battle, some of the Franks allied with the Romans encountered a band of the Gepids loyal to Attila and engaged them in a skirmish. Jordanes's recorded number of 15,000 dead on either side for this skirmish is not verifiable. Attila had set up a tactical delay along his route of retreat in order to keep Aetius from catching him before he arrived at a suitable battlefield location. The two forces at last met somewhere on the Catalaunian Plains circa 20 June, a date first proposed by J. B. Bury and since accepted by many, although some authors have proposed the first week of July or 27 September. The date of the battle can be secured to June by the entries of Hydatius's chronicle, which places it between the appearance and disappearance of Halley's Comet.

According to tradition, Attila had his diviners examine the entrails of a sacrifice the morning of the day of the battle. They foretold that disaster would befall the Huns, but one of the enemy leaders would be killed. Attila delayed until the ninth hour (about 2:30 pm) so the impending sunset would help his troops to flee the battlefield in case of defeat. Hughes takes his own interpretation of this, noting that the divination may be an indicator of Attila's barbarity and therefore possibly a fabrication. He states that the choice to begin the battle at the ninth hour was due to the fact that both sides spent the entire day carefully deploying their coalition armies.

According to Jordanes, the Catalaunian plain rose on one side by a sharp slope to a ridge; this geographical feature dominated the battlefield and became the center of the battle. The Huns first seized the right side of the ridge, while the Romans seized the left, with the crest unoccupied between them. Jordanes explains that the Visigoths held the right side, the Romans the left, with Sangiban of uncertain loyalty and his Alans surrounded in the middle. The Hunnic forces attempted to take the ridge, but were outstripped by the Romans under Aetius and the Goths under Thorismund.

Jordanes goes on to state that Theodoric, whilst leading his own men against the enemy Amali Goths, was killed in the assault without his men noticing. He then states that Theodoric was either thrown from his horse and trampled to death by his advancing men, or slain by the spear of the Amali Andag. Since Jordanes served as the notary of Andag's son Gunthigis, even if this latter story is not true, this version was certainly a proud family tradition.

Then Jordanes claims the Visigoths outstripped the speed of the Alans beside them and fell upon Attila's own Hunnic household unit. Attila was forced to seek refuge in his own camp, which he had fortified with wagons. The Romano-Gothic charge apparently swept past the Hunnic camp in pursuit; when night fell, Thorismund, son of king Theodoric, returning to friendly lines, mistakenly entered Attila's encampment. There he was wounded in the ensuing melee before his followers could rescue him. Darkness also separated Aetius from his own men. As he feared that disaster had befallen them, he spent the rest of the night with his Gothic allies.

On the following day, finding the battlefield was "piled high with bodies and the Huns did not venture forth", the Goths and Romans met to decide their next move. Knowing that Attila was low on provisions and "was hindered from approaching by a shower of arrows placed within the confines of the Roman camp", they started to besiege his camp. In this desperate situation, Attila remained unbowed and "heaped up a funeral pyre of horse saddles, so that if the enemy should attack him, he was determined to cast himself into the flames, that none might have the joy of wounding him and that the lord of so many races might not fall into the hands of his foes".

While Attila was besieged in his camp, the Visigoths searched for their missing king and his son Thorismund. After a long search, they found Theodoric's corpse "where the dead lay thickest" and bore him away with heroic songs in sight of the enemy. Upon learning of his father's death, Thorismund wanted to assault Attila's camp, but Aetius dissuaded him. According to Jordanes, Aetius feared that if the Huns were completely destroyed, the Visigoths would break off their allegiance to the Roman Empire and become an even graver threat. So Aetius persuaded Thorismund to return home quickly and secure the throne for himself, before his brothers could. Otherwise, civil war would ensue among the Visigoths. Thorismund quickly returned to Tolosa (present-day Toulouse) and became king without any resistance. Gregory of Tours claims Aetius used the same reasoning to dismiss his Frankish allies, and collected the booty of the battlefield for himself.

== Outcome ==
The primary sources give little information as to the outcome of the battle, barring Jordanes. All emphasise the casualty count of the battle, and the battle became increasingly seen as a Roman allied victory, beginning with Cassiodorus in the early sixth century.

Hydatius states:

The Huns broke the peace and plundered the Gallic provinces. A great many cities were taken. On the Catalaunian Plains, not far from the city of Metz, which they had taken, the Huns were cut down in battle with the aid of God and defeated by general Aetius and King Theoderic, who had made a peace treaty with each other. The darkness of night interrupted the fighting. King Theoderic was laid low there and died. Almost 300,000 men are said to have fallen in that battle.

— Hydatius, Chronicon, 150.

Prosper, contemporary to the battle, states:

After killing his brother, Attila was strengthened by the resources of the deceased and forced many thousands of neighboring peoples into a war. This war, he announced as a guardian of Roman friendship, he would wage only against the Goths. But when he had crossed the Rhine and many Gallic cities had experienced his savage attacks, both our people and the Goths soon agreed to oppose with allied forces the fury of their proud enemies. And Aetius had such great foresight that, when fighting men were hurriedly collected from everywhere, a not unequal force met the opposing multitude. Although the slaughter of all those who died there was incalculable – for neither side gave way – it appears that the Huns were defeated in this battle because those among them that survived lost their taste for fighting and turned back home.

— Prosper, Epitoma Chronicon, s.a. 451.

The battle raged five miles down from Troyes on the field called Maurica in Campania.

— Prosper, Additamenta ad Chronicon Prosperi Hauniensis, s.a. 451.

At this time Attila, king of the Huns, invaded the Gauls. Here trusting in lord Peter the apostle himself patrician Aetius proceeded against him, he would fight with the help of God.

— Prosper, Continuatio Codex Ovetensis.

Battle was made in the Gauls between Aetius and Attila king of the Huns with both peoples and massacre. Attila fled into the greater Gauls.

— Prosper, Continuatio Codex Reichenaviensis.

The Gallic Chronicles of 452 and 511 state:

Attila entered Gaul as if he had the right to ask for a wife that was owed to him. There, he inflicted and suffered defeat and then withdrew to his homeland.

— Chronica Gallica Anno 452, s.a. 451.

Patrician Aetius with King Theodoric of the Goths fight against Attila king of the Huns at Tricasses on the Mauriac plain, where Theodoric was slain, by whom it is uncertain, and Laudaricus the relative of Attila: and the bodies were countless.

— Chronica Gallica Anno 511, s.a. 451.

The Paschale Chronicle, preserving a garbled and abbreviated passage of Priscus, states:

While Theodosius and Valentinian, the Augusti, were emperors, Attila, from the race of the Gepid Huns, marched against Rome and Constantinople with a multitude of many tens of thousands. He notified Valentinian, the emperor of Rome, through a Gothic ambassador, "Attila, my master and yours, orders you through me to make ready the palace for him." He gave the same notice to Theodosius, the emperor in Constantinople, through a Gothic ambassador. Aetius, the first man of senatorial rank in Rome, heard the excessive daring of Attila's desperate response and went off to Alaric in Gaul, who was an enemy of Rome because of Honorius. He urged him to join him in standing against Attila, since he had destroyed many Roman cities. They unexpectedly launched himself against him as he was bivouacked near the Danubios river, and cut down his many thousands. Alaric, wounded by a saggita in the engagement, died. Attila died similarly, carried off by a nasal hemorrhage while he slept at night with his Hunnic concubine. It was suspected that this girl killed him. The very wise Priscus the Thracian wrote about this war.

— Chronicon Paschale, p. 587.

Jordanes reports the number of dead from this battle as 165,000, excluding the casualties of the Franco-Gepid skirmish previous to the main battle. Hydatius, a historian who lived at the time of Attila's invasion, reports the number of 300,000 dead. The garbled Chronicle of Fredegar states that in a prior battle on the Loire, 200,000 Goths and 150,000 Huns were slain. The figures offered are implausibly high, but the battle was noted as being exceptionally bloody by all of the primary sources. It is ultimately Jordanes's writing that leads to the difference in opinions in modern interpretations of the battle's outcome.

=== As a Roman victory ===
In the traditional account, modern scholars take a very direct interpretation of Jordanes, although usually with various points of contention. Modern scholars tend to agree that the battle took place on a long ridge, not a plain with a hill to one side. Hughes argues that the Huns deployed in the centre, with their vassals on the wings, because they were expecting a Roman infantry centre, with cavalry wings. This way Attila could pin down the centre with the disorganised Hunnic style of warfare, while the majority of his troops focused on breaking one or both of the enemy flanks. However, Hughes argues that the Romans were expecting this, which is why Aetius placed the Alans in the centre of the formation, who were skilled cavalrymen and had advanced knowledge of how to fight alongside the Roman style of warfare. Bernard Bachrach also notes that Jordanes's point of placing the Alans in the centre due to disloyalty is biased on Jordanes's part.

Jordanes's description of the battle, according to Hughes, takes place from the Roman perspective. Attila's forces arrived on the ridge first, on the far right side, before the Visigoths could take that position. Then Aetius's Romans arrived on the left side of the ridge, and repulsed the Gepids as they came up. Finally the Alans and the Visigoths under Thorismund fought their way up and secured the centre of the ridge, holding it against Attila. However, Hughes differs from mainstream explanations in that he places Thorismund between the Alans and Visigothic main body, rather than on the Visigothic flank. MacDowall, for example, places Thorismund on the far right of the battlefield. The final phase of the battle is characterised by the Gothic attempt to take the right side of the ridge, in which Theodoric is slain, with the rest of his army unaware of his death. It is at this point that Thorismund located Attila's position in the Hunnic battle line, and attacked the Hunnic centre, nearly slaying Attila himself and forcing the Hunnic centre to retreat. Both armies fell into confusion as darkness descended, and neither side knew the outcome of the battle until the following morning.

After the battle, the allies discussed what to do next and resolved to place Attila under siege for a few days while they discussed the matter. Aetius allegedly persuaded both Thorismund and the Goths, and the Franks as well, to leave the battle and return home. Hughes argues that since the Franks were fighting a civil war in the battle, and Thorismund had five brothers who could usurp his newfound position as king, that it is likely Aetius did advise them to do so. John O'Flynn argues that Aetius persuaded the Visigoths to return home in order to eliminate a group of volatile allies, and argues that he let Attila escape because he would have been just as happy to make an alliance with the Huns as with the Visigoths. The majority of historians also share the view that at this point Attila's "aura of invincibility" was broken, and that Aetius allowed the Huns to retreat in the hopes he could return to a status of partnership with them and draw on the Huns for future military support.

=== As a Roman defeat or indecisive ===
It has been suggested by Hyun Jin Kim that the entire battle is a play on the Battle of Marathon, with the Romans being the Plateans on the left, the Alans the weak Athenian centre, and the Goths the Athenian regulars on the right, with Theodoric as Miltiades and Thorismund as Callimachus. He sees the return home by the Goths to secure Thorismund's throne as the same as the return to Athens to protect it from sedition and the Persian Navy. Kim's suggestion of Jordanes borrowing from Herodotus has been noted by prior scholarship: Franz Altheim drew a parallel between the Catalaunian Plains and Salamis, and thought that the battle narrative was completely fabricated. J. M. Wallace-Hadrill drew a parallel between Aetius and Themistocles regarding the alleged subterfuge after the battle in some primary source accounts. Other historians have noted its possible political statements on Jordanes's contemporary time, particularly regarding the Battle of Vouille and the Gothic Wars towards the end of Justinian's reign. Ultimately this has led mainstream scholarship to agree that Jordanes's description of the Battle of the Catalaunian Plains is distorted, even if they do not agree with a pro-Hunnish interpretation of the outcome. However, Kim's views have received a mixed reception among scholars of the period, with one reviewer noting that much of the text amounts to "a confused and confusing story, involving the rewriting of histories, genealogies and chronologies ... exacerbated by strange and clumsy conflations." His view that Attila won the battle therefore should be taken with scepticism.

Other authors have previously considered the battle to have been indecisive. This latter view is rather widely accepted, although the outcome remains in disagreement as a whole. The most recent and comprehensive argument for an indecisive outcome belongs to that of Schultheis, who argues that Jordanes's work is more complicated than assumed due to the rearranging of a narrative first penned by a Goth named Ablabius in 471 and expanded by Cassiodorus, which he then himself abridged again and which in turn was used by Jordanes. Schultheis argues that provided that the entire conflict was not a literary topos based on the Battle of Marathon, the Alans were placed in the centre of the battle line due to their effectiveness against the Huns as prescribed by the Strategikon of Pseudo-Maurice, and that Jordanes's text indicates the Hunnic centre retreated before Thorismund charged. The Romans and Alans attacked down the ridge and across the plain to Attila's camp, while the Amali and other Gothic groups chased the collapsing Gothic right back to their camp, resulting in the mass confusion that followed. He concludes that losses during the retreats were heavy and led to an indecisive outcome, which an analysis of the chronology of primary source accounts shows over time was embellished into a Gothic victory.

== Aftermath and reputation of the battle ==
The immediate and long-term effects of the Battle of the Catalaunian Plains are somewhat disputed. Attila returned to invade the Western Roman Empire in 452, which was more successful than his invasion of Gaul. After a 3-month siege of Aquileia, arranged by Aetius in the hopes it would use up his whole campaigning season, Attila razed the city and ravaged the Po Valley. Aetius, without aid from the federates in Gaul and without the military capacity to stop Attila on his own, sent an embassy consisting of Pope Leo I, Trygetius, and Gennadius Avienus to broker a treaty with Attila. Attila ultimately retreated from Italy, most likely due to a local famine and disease within his army. Some authors have argued that this sequence of military fiascos for Aetius ultimately led to his downfall. Andrew Merrils and Richard Miles also argue that it led to the downfall of Valentinian III as a result of Aetius's assassination. This has been disputed recently by Meghan McEvoy, who argues that Valentinian III wanted to be an active emperor and simply needed to remove his manager, and that there was no real direct cause for Aetius's murder.

In Gaul, the effects were somewhat more significant. Hughes argues that their assistance at the Catalaunian Plains led the Goths to destroy the Alans and besiege Orléans, believing that they had not been adequately rewarded for their service. In turn, this led to further concessions to the Goths from Aetius after Thorismund's assassination by his brother, who was amicable to the Romans. He thinks this may have been the point at which the Goths gained the same status of an independent kingdom that Gaiseric had. On the other hand, Kim argues that the battle led to the decline of Roman influence in northern Gaul, and strengthened the position of the Salian Franks and the Burgundians. He argues that it ultimately led to the victory of Childeric and the Franks over the Goths, the Roman comes Paul who had replaced Aegidius, and Odoacer, who returned to the Danube. This set the Franks up for dominance in Gaul and put Odoacer back in power as king of the Sciri. This would ultimately lead to his service during the final years of the Western Roman Empire and his establishment of a Kingdom of Italy.

Tackholm makes a distinct note of the increasing prominence of the battle in Gothic history. He shows that contemporary sources state the battle was inconclusive and give credit to Aetius, while later sources cast the battle as a Gothic victory and a major point of Gothic pride. This is also noted by Barnish, who claims that Cassiodorus's and Jordanes's works intended to portray Clovis, who had been at war with the Ostrogoths, as a new Attila and Theodoric the Great as a new Aetius. However, in the Roman sources, like those of Procopius and Victor Tunnensis, Aetius remains the central figure of pride and importance.

The most important effect of the battle is usually considered to be its impact on long-term Hunnic hegemony in Europe, of which there are differing opinions.

== Historical importance ==
=== Traditional view: battle was of macro-historical importance ===
The Battle of the Catalaunian Plains is given its first modern historical perspective by Edward Gibbon, who called it the last victory achieved in the name of the Western Roman Empire. The first individual historical survey of the battle was given by Edward Shepherd Creasy, who heralded it as a triumph of Christian Europe over the pagan savages of Asia, saving classical heritage and European culture.

Attila's attacks on the Western empire were soon renewed, but never with such peril to the civilized world as had menaced it before his defeat at Châlons; and on his death, two years after that battle, the vast empire which his genius had founded was soon dissevered by the successful revolts of the subject nations. The name of the Huns ceased for some centuries to inspire terror in Western Europe, and their ascendancy passed away with the life of the great king by whom it had been so fearfully augmented.

John Julius Norwich, a historian known for his works on Venice and the Byzantine Empire, somewhat reiterates Creasy, saying of the battle of Châlons:

It should never be forgotten that in the summer of 451 and again in 452, the whole fate of western civilization hung in the balance. Had the Hunnish army not been halted in these two successive campaigns, had its leader toppled Valentinian from his throne and set up his own capital at Ravenna or Rome, there is little doubt that both Gaul and Italy would have been reduced to spiritual and cultural deserts.

Modern authors have mostly moved away from this viewpoint, yet some categorise it as a battle that broke the myth of Hunnish invincibility. Geoffrey Parker called it a triumph of Roman defensive strategy. Arther Ferrill notes that, aside from the Battle of Qarqar (Karkar), this was the first significant conflict that involved large alliances on both sides. No single nation dominated either side; rather, two alliances met and fought in surprising coordination for the time. Meghan McEvoy also indicates that Aetius's successful construction and utilisation of the federates in Gaul was a testament to his diplomatic and administrative skills, as well as to the influence of his military success. Ferrill writes:

After he secured the Rhine, Attila moved into central Gaul and put Orléans under siege. Had he gained his objective, he would have been in a strong position to subdue the Visigoths in Aquitaine, but Aetius had put together a formidable coalition against the Hun. Working frenetically, the Roman leader had built a powerful alliance of Visigoths, Alans and Burgundians, uniting them with their traditional enemy, the Romans, for the defense of Gaul. Even though all parties to the protection of the Western Roman Empire had a common hatred of the Huns, it was still a remarkable achievement on Aetius's part to have drawn them into an effective military relationship.

Hyun Jin Kim thinks that the battle had a major impact on the future of Roman Gaul. He doesn't believe that it was a religious and cultural victory over the Huns of Central Asia. Kim argues that the battle significantly weakened the military capacity of the Alans, Visigoths, and the Romans, which allowed for Frankish and Burgundian hegemony in North Gaul. He also believes that it set up the career of Odoacer, who was later to found his own Kingdom in Italy after deposing the last Western Roman Emperor and submitting to Constantinople.

=== Opposing view: battle was not of macro-historical importance ===
However, J. B. Bury expresses a quite different judgement:

The battle of Maurica was a battle of nations, but its significance has been enormously exaggerated in conventional history. It cannot in any reasonable sense be designated as one of the critical battles of the world. The Gallic campaign had really been decided by the strategic success of the allies in cutting off Attila from Orleans. The battle was fought when he was in full retreat, and its value lay in damaging his prestige as an invincible conqueror, in weakening his forces, and in hindering him from extending the range of his ravages.

This assessment is also corroborated by Hughes, Bachrach, and Kim, all of whom argue that the real turning point of the invasion of Gaul was the successful defence of Orléans. They consider that the Battle of the Catalaunian Plains occurred as Attila was already retreating from Gaul. Bury also considers that as a whole, the Battle of the Catalaunian Plains would not have seriously altered history had it been a Hunnish victory:

If Attila had been victorious, if he had defeated the Romans and the Goths at Orleans, if he had held Gaul at his mercy and had translated – and we have no evidence that this was his design – the seat of his government and the abode of his people from the Theiss to the Seine or the Loire, there is no reason to suppose that the course of history would have been seriously altered. For the rule of the Huns in Gaul could only have been a matter of a year or two; it could not have survived here, any more than it survived in Hungary, the death of the great king, on whose brains and personal character it depended. Without depreciating the achievement of Aetius and Theoderic we must recognise that at worst the danger they averted was of a totally different order from the issues which were at stake on the fields of Plataea and the Metaurus. If Attila had succeeded in his campaign, he would probably have been able to compel the surrender of Honoria, and if a son had been born of their marriage and proclaimed Augustus in Gaul, the Hun might have been able to exercise considerable influence on the fortunes of that country; but that influence would probably not have been anti-Roman.

Despite his views on the battle, it is noteworthy that Bury, who does not believe the Battle of Chalôns to be of macrohistorical importance, characterizes Aetius's rule thus: "From the end of the regency to his own death, Aetius was master of the Empire in the west, and it must be imputed to his policy and arms that Imperial rule did not break down in all the provinces by the middle of the fifth century." Bury thinks it clear that there was no one capable of taking Aetius's place. But he also considers that the Battle of Nedao was far more consequential to European history than the Battle of the Catalaunian Plains, a view also shared by many modern authors. Kim argues that the Huns were instrumental in triggering the evolution of medieval Europe during the early migration era by the introduction of East Asian, Central Asian, and Iranian cultural and societal practices, which agrees with Bury that the outcome of the battle would not have turned Europe into a cultural desert.

== See also ==
- Late Roman army
- Hunnenschlacht

== Sources ==
- Bury, John Bagnall (1958) [1923]. History of the Later Roman Empire. New York: Dover.
- Heather, Peter (2007). The Fall of the Roman Empire: A New History of Rome and the Barbarians. Oxford University Press. ISBN 978-0-19-532541-6.
- Hodgkin, Thomas (1967) [1880–1889]. Italy and Her Invaders. Vol. II. New York: Russel & Russel.
- Hughes, Ian (2012). Aetius: Attila's Nemesis. Barnsley: Pen and Sword Books Ltd.
- Kim, Hyun Jin (2013). The Huns, Rome, and the Birth of Europe. Cambridge: Cambridge University Press.
- Lebedynsky, Iaroslav (2011). La campagne d'Attila en Gaule 451 apr. J.-C [Attila's Campaign in Gaul, 451 AD] (in French). Clermont-Ferrand: Lemme Edit.
- MacDowall, Simon (2015). Catalaunian Fields AD 451, Rome's Last Great Battle. Oxford: Osprey Publishing Ltd.
- Prostko-Prostyński, Jan (2021). A History of the Herules. Adam Mickiewicz University. ISBN 978-83-232-3902-4.
- Richardot, Philippe (2005). La Fin de l'Armee Romaine 284–476 [The End of the Roman Army 284–476] (in French). Paris: Economica.
- Scharf, Ralf (1999). "Ripari und Olibriones?". Mitteilungen des Instituts für Österreichische Geschichtsforschung (in German) (107): 1–11. doi:10.7767/miog.1999.107.jg.1. S2CID 163821400.
- Schultheis, Evan (2019). The Battle of the Catalaunian Fields, AD 451: Flavius Aetius, Attila the Hun, and the Transformation of Gaul. Barnsley: Pen & Sword Books Ltd. ISBN 978-1526745651.
- Tackholm, Ulf (1969). "Aetius and the Battle on the Catalaunian Fields". Opuscula Romana (7:15): 259–276.
- Whately, Conor (2012). "Jordanes, the Battle of the Catalaunian Fields and Constantinople". Dialogues d'historie ancienne (8): 57–70. doi:10.3917/dha.hs80.0065. S2CID 161851128. Archived from the original on 24 February 2021.

=== Further reading ===
- Dahm, Murray (2022). Hunnic Warrior vs. Late Roman Cavalryman: Attila's Wars, AD 440–53. Oxford: Osprey Publishing.
- Ferrill, Arther (1988). The Fall of the Roman Empire: The Military Explanation. London: Thames & Hudson.
- Fuller, John Frederick Charles (1987). A Military History of the Western World. Vol. 1. New York: Da Capo Press. ISBN 978-0306803048.
- Hughes, Ian (2019). Attila the Hun: Arch-Enemy of Rome. Barnsley: Pen and Sword Books Ltd.
- Man, John (2006). Attila: The Barbarian King Who Challenged Rome. New York: Thomas Dunne Books.
