= Roger de La Fresnaye =

French painter

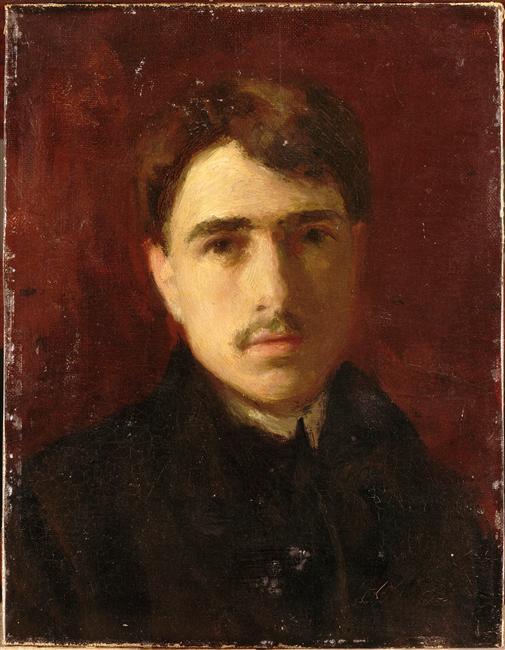
- Self portrait, 1905-07, Musée National d'Art Moderne, Paris
- Born: 11 July 1885; Le Mans, France
- Died: 27 November 1925 (aged 40); Grasse, France
- Known for: Painting
- Movement: Cubism

Roger de La Fresnaye (French: [ʁɔʒe də la fʁɛnɛ]; 11 July 1885 – 27 November 1925) was a French Cubist painter.

== Early years and education ==
La Fresnaye was born in Le Mans where his father, an officer in the French army, was temporarily stationed. The La Fresnayes were an aristocratic family whose ancestral home, the Château de La Fresnaye, is in Falaise. His education was classically based, and was followed from 1903 to 1904 by studies at the Académie Julian in Paris, and from 1904 to 1908 at the École des Beaux-Arts. From 1908 he studied at the Académie Ranson under Maurice Denis and Paul Sérusier, whose joint influence is evident in early works such as Woman with Chrysanthemums, 1909. This demonstrates the dreamlike symbolist ambience and stylistic character of work by the Les Nabis group. In 1909, Fresnaye travelled to Munich, where he encountered the German Expressionists, and then, in 1911, to northern Italy where he began to introduce more cuboid and abstract elements into his own painting.

== Career ==
From 1912 to 1914 La Fresnaye was a member of the Section d'Or group of artists, and his work demonstrates an individual response to cubism. He was influenced by Georges Braque and Pablo Picasso, but his work has a more decorative than structural feel and his prismatic colours reflect the influence of Robert Delaunay. He was a member of the Puteaux Group, an orphist offshoot of cubism led by Jacques Villon. His most famous work is The Conquest of the Air, 1913, which depicts himself and his brother outdoors with a balloon in the background.

La Fresnaye enlisted in the French army in World War I but contracted tuberculosis and was discharged in 1918. His health deteriorated rapidly after the war. He never recovered the physical energy to undertake sustained work. In the later paintings that he did create, he abandoned cubist spatial analysis for a more linear style. He ceased painting in 1922 but continued to draw. De la Fresnaye died in Grasse in 1925 at the age of 40.

== Art market ==
On 24 March 2017, a new record was established for a work by De la Fresnaye at auction when La conquête de l'air, avec deux personnages sold for €2,370,500 at Christie's in Paris.

== Gallery ==
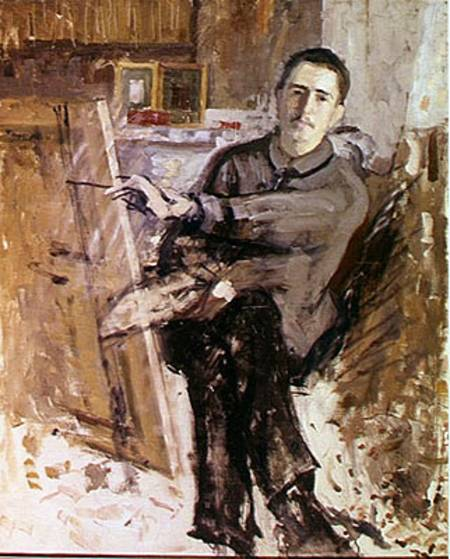
Self Portrait, ca. 1908-09

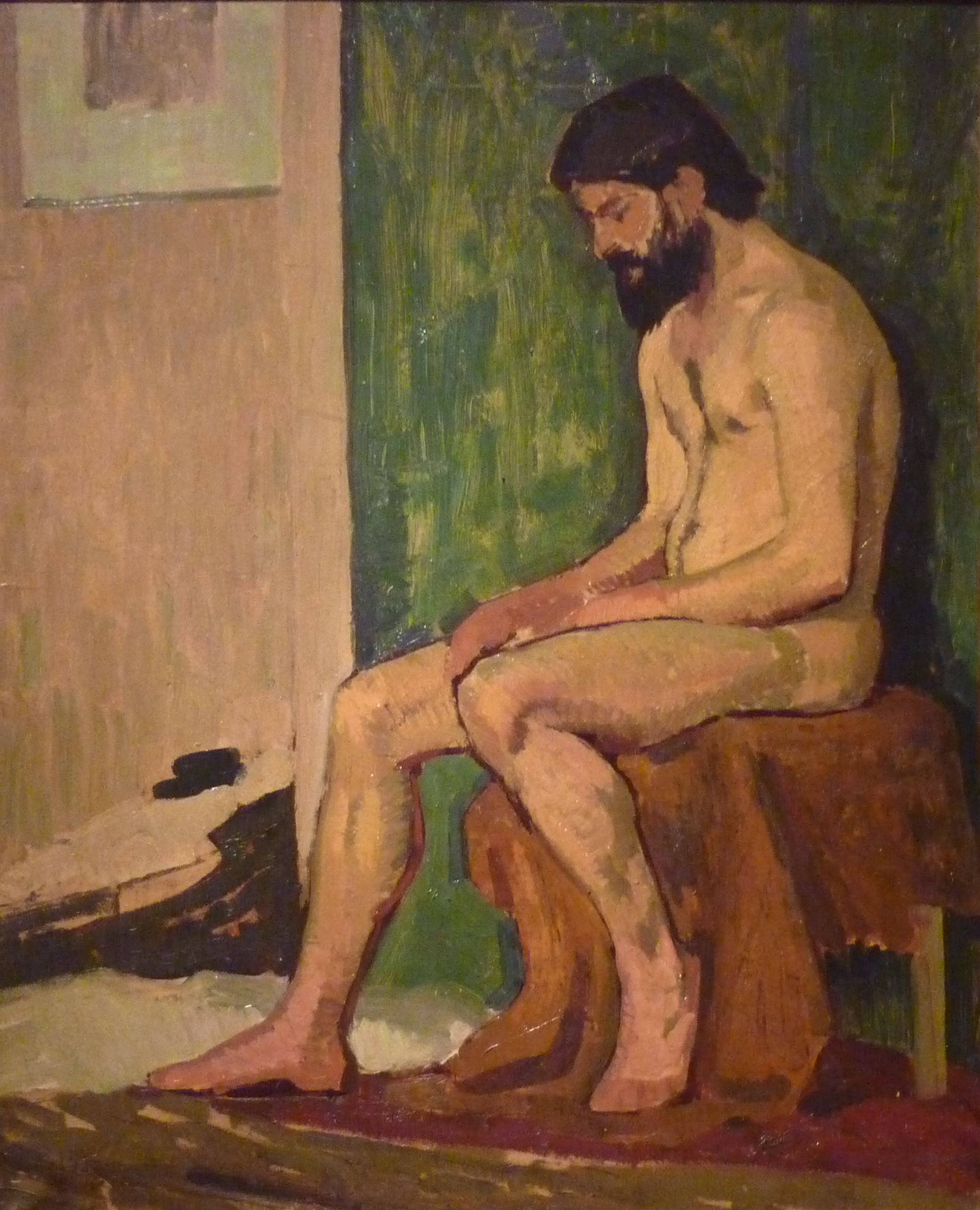
L'Homme barbu assis, circa 1909, Musée d'art moderne de Troyes

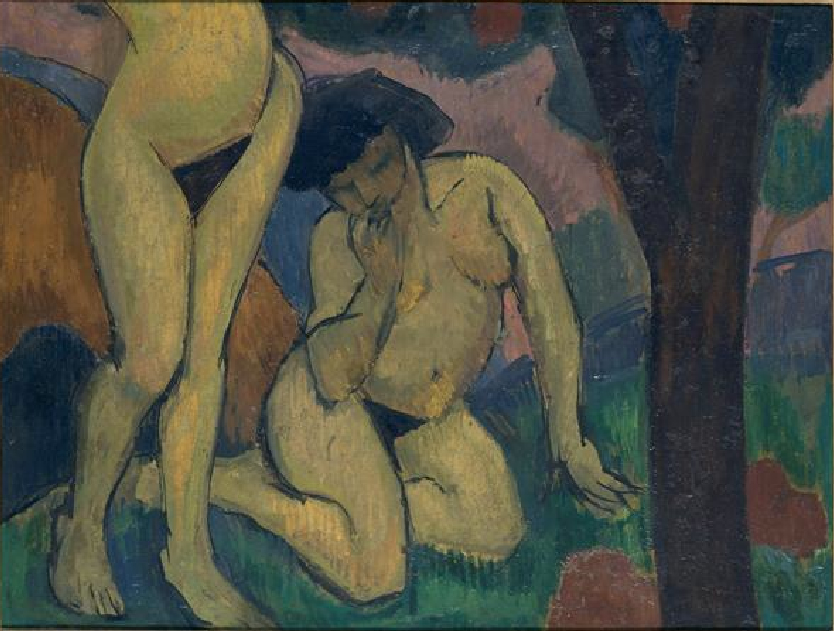
Deux nus dans un paysage, 1910, MNAM, Centre Georges Pompidou, Paris

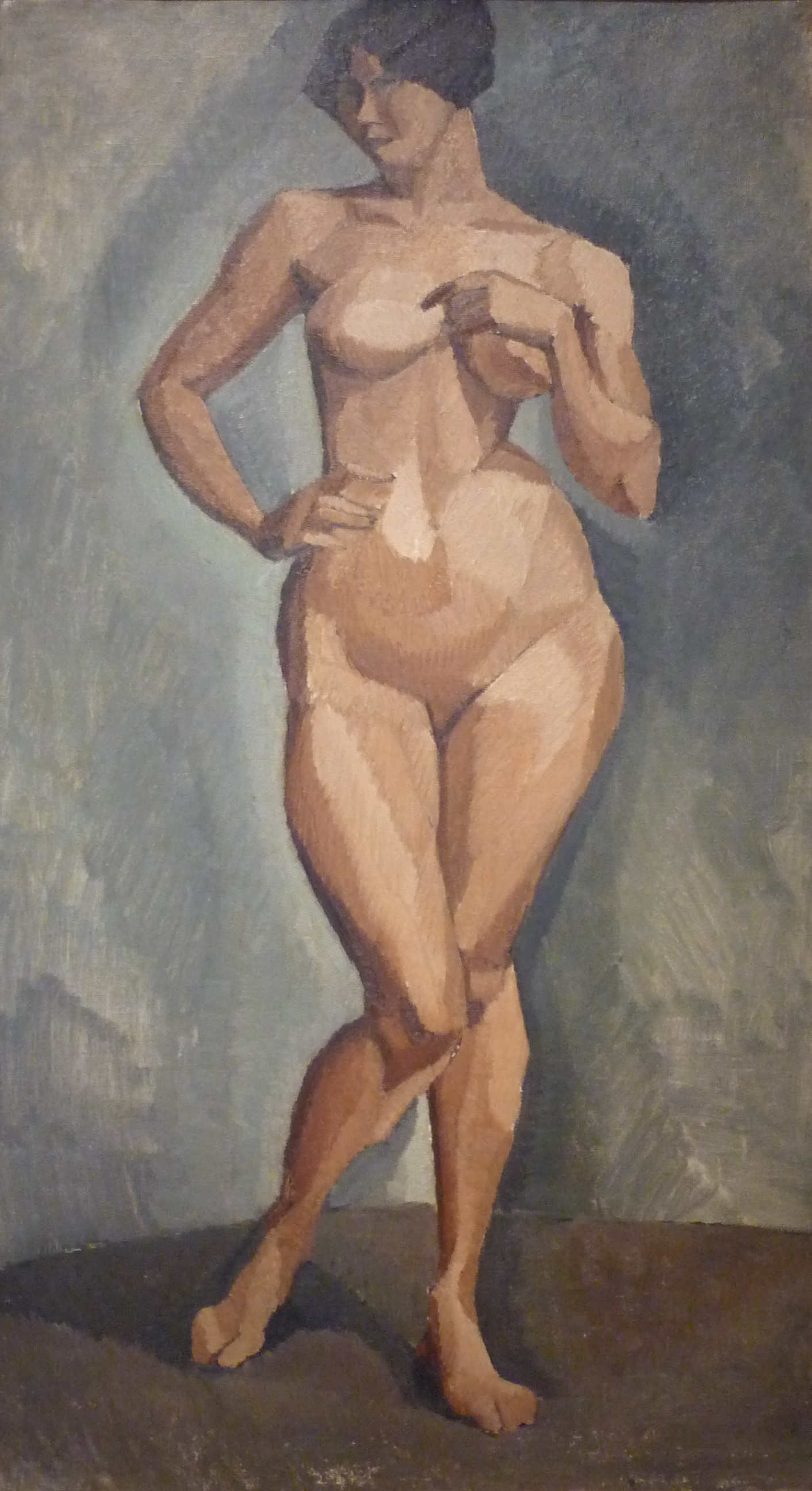
Nu debout de face, 1910–11, Musée d'art moderne de Troyes

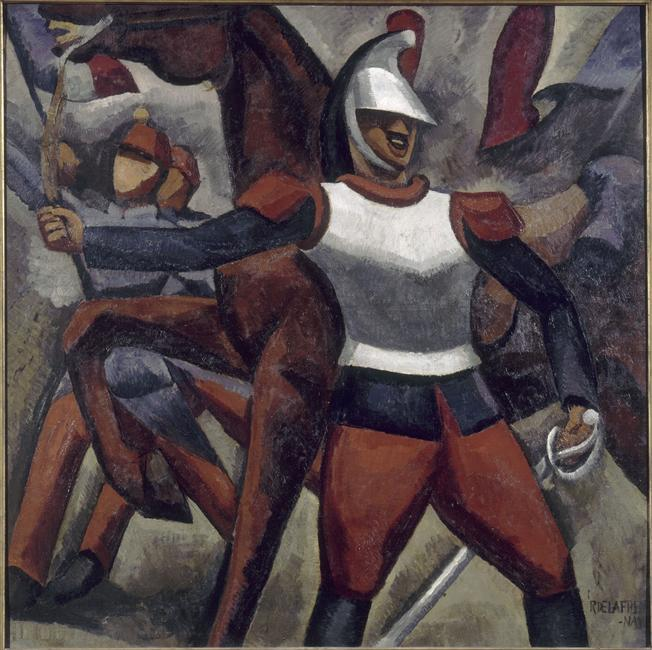
Cuirassier, 1912, Musée des Beaux-Arts, Lyon

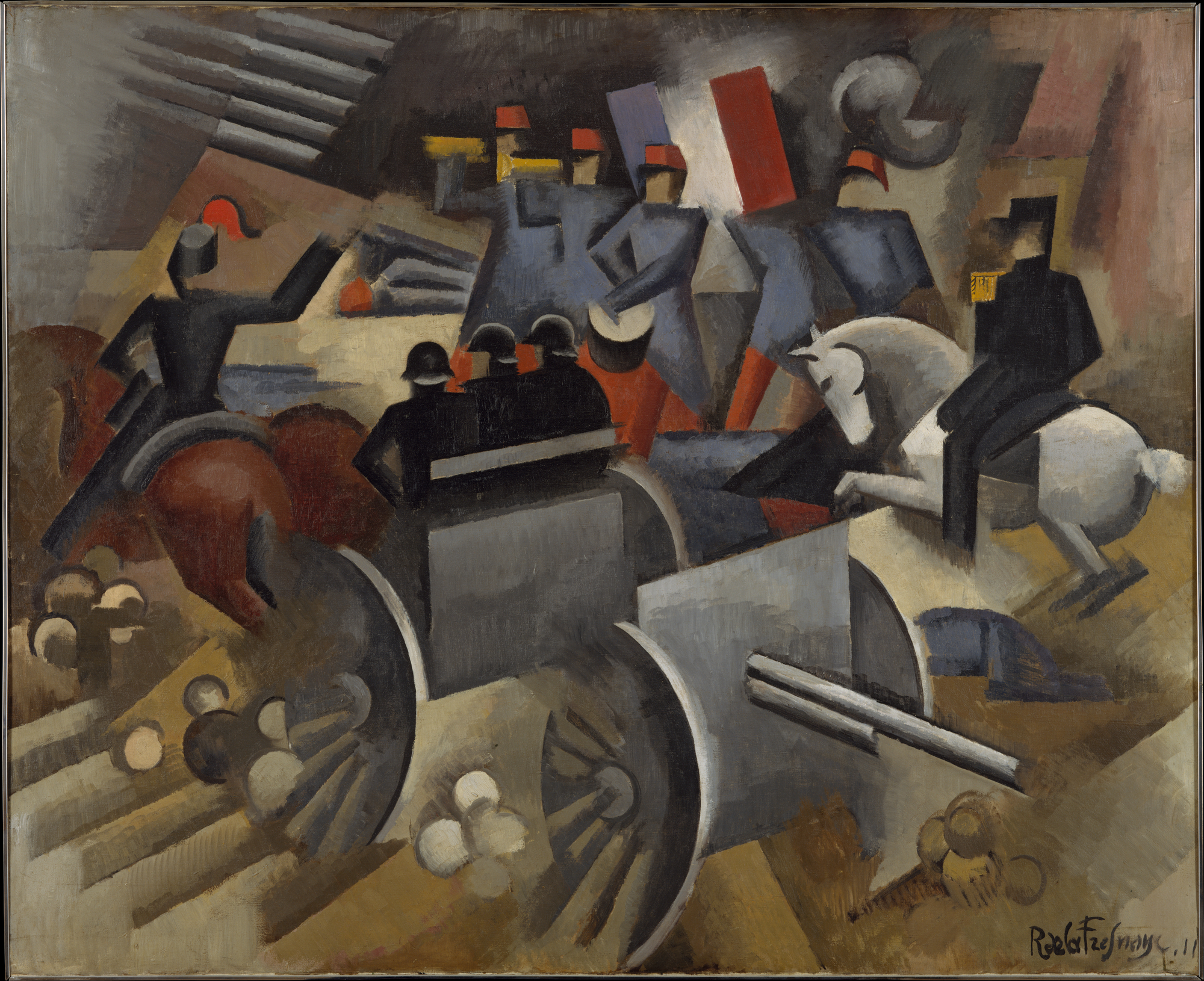
Artillery, 1911, Metropolitan Museum of Art, New York

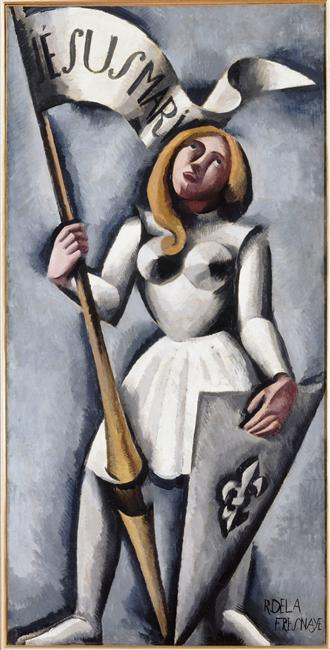
Jeanne d'Arc, 1912, Musée d'art moderne de Troyes

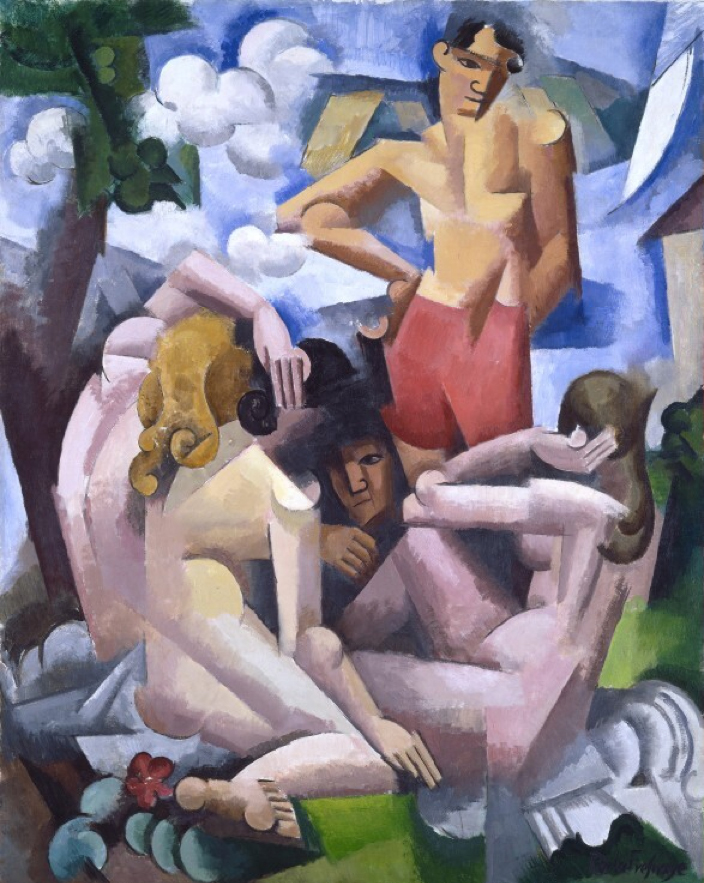
The Bathers (Les Baigneuses), 1912, National Gallery of Art, Washington DC.

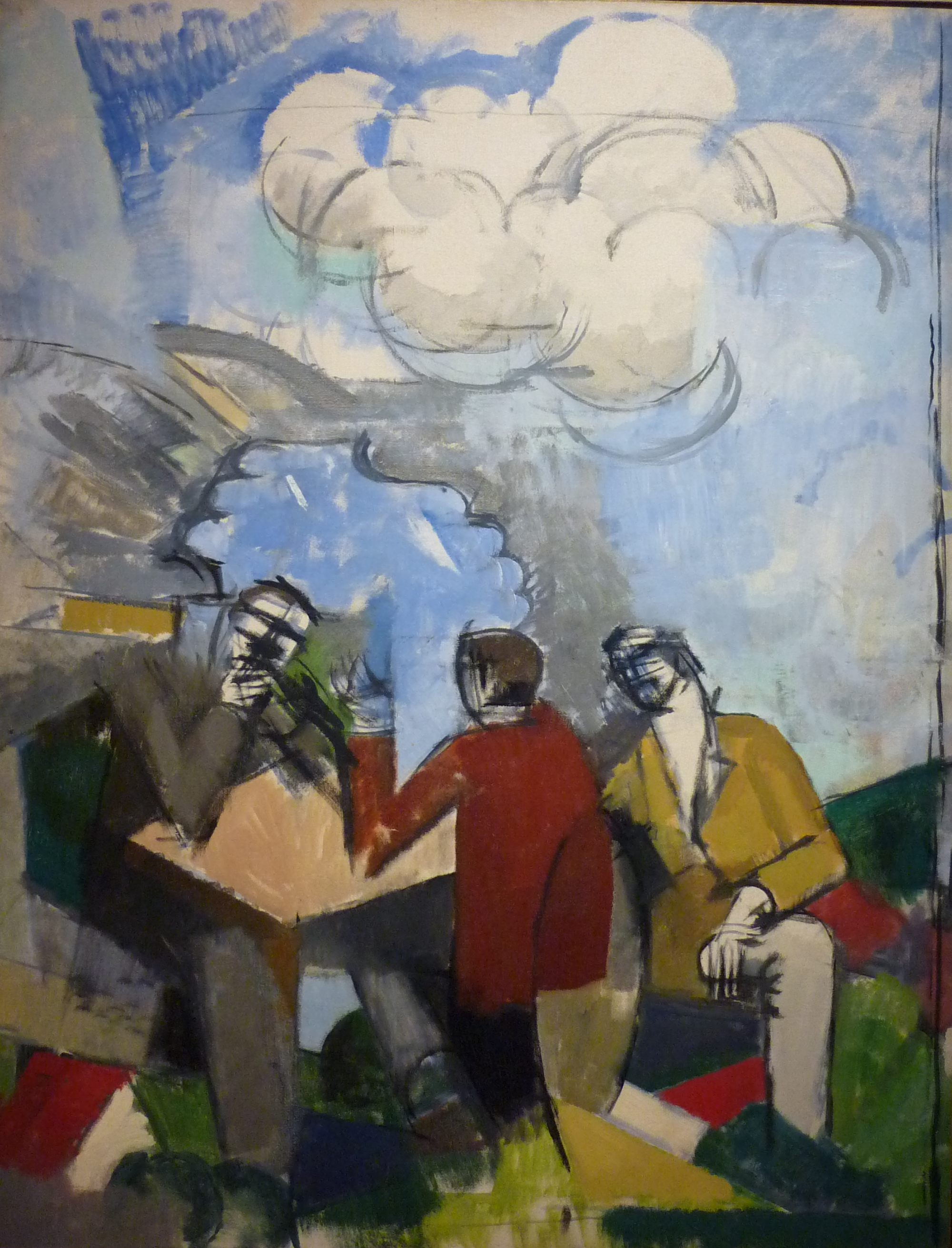
La conquete de l'air, 1913, Musée d'art moderne de Troyes

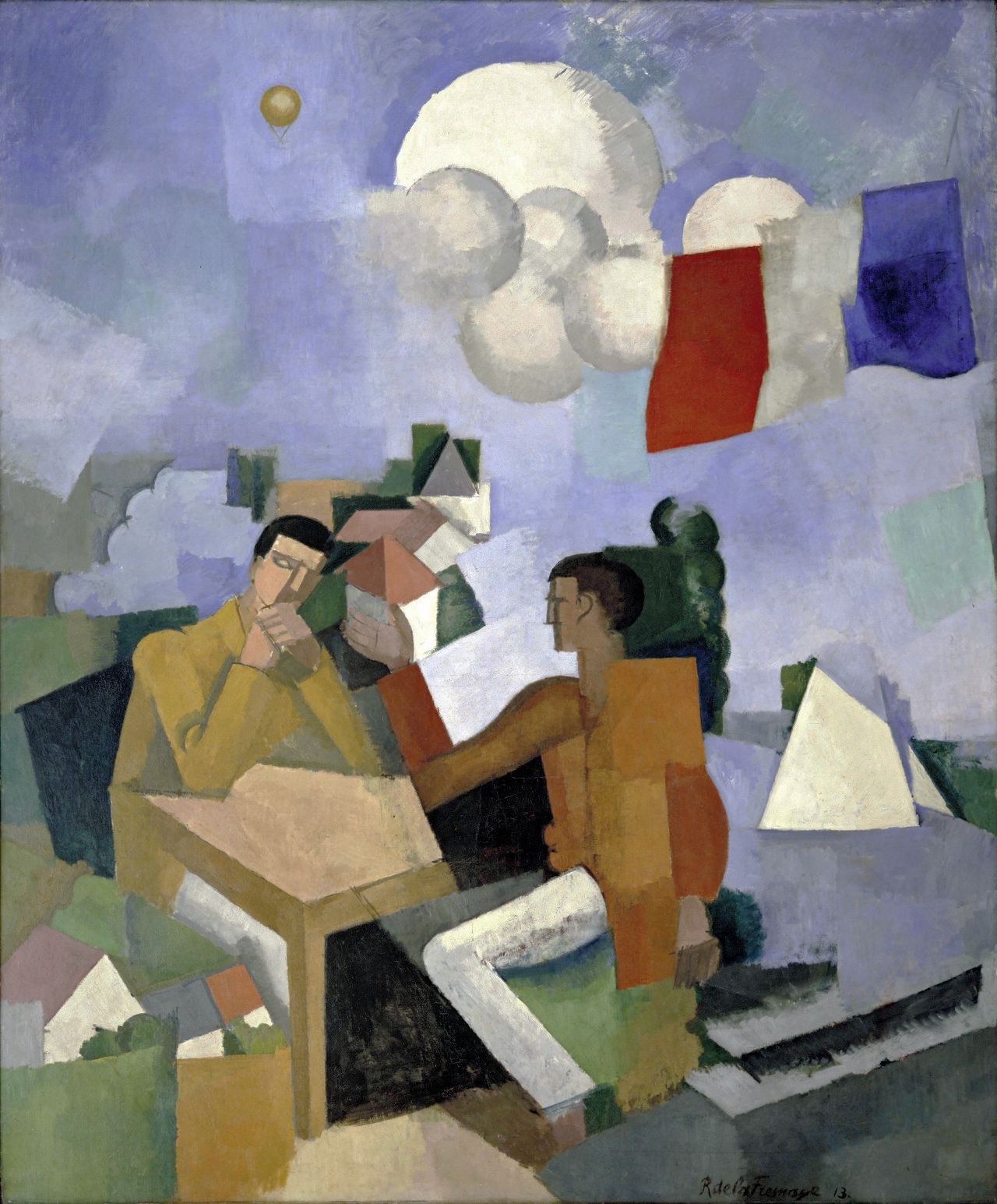
The Conquest of the Air, 1913, Museum of Modern Art, New York

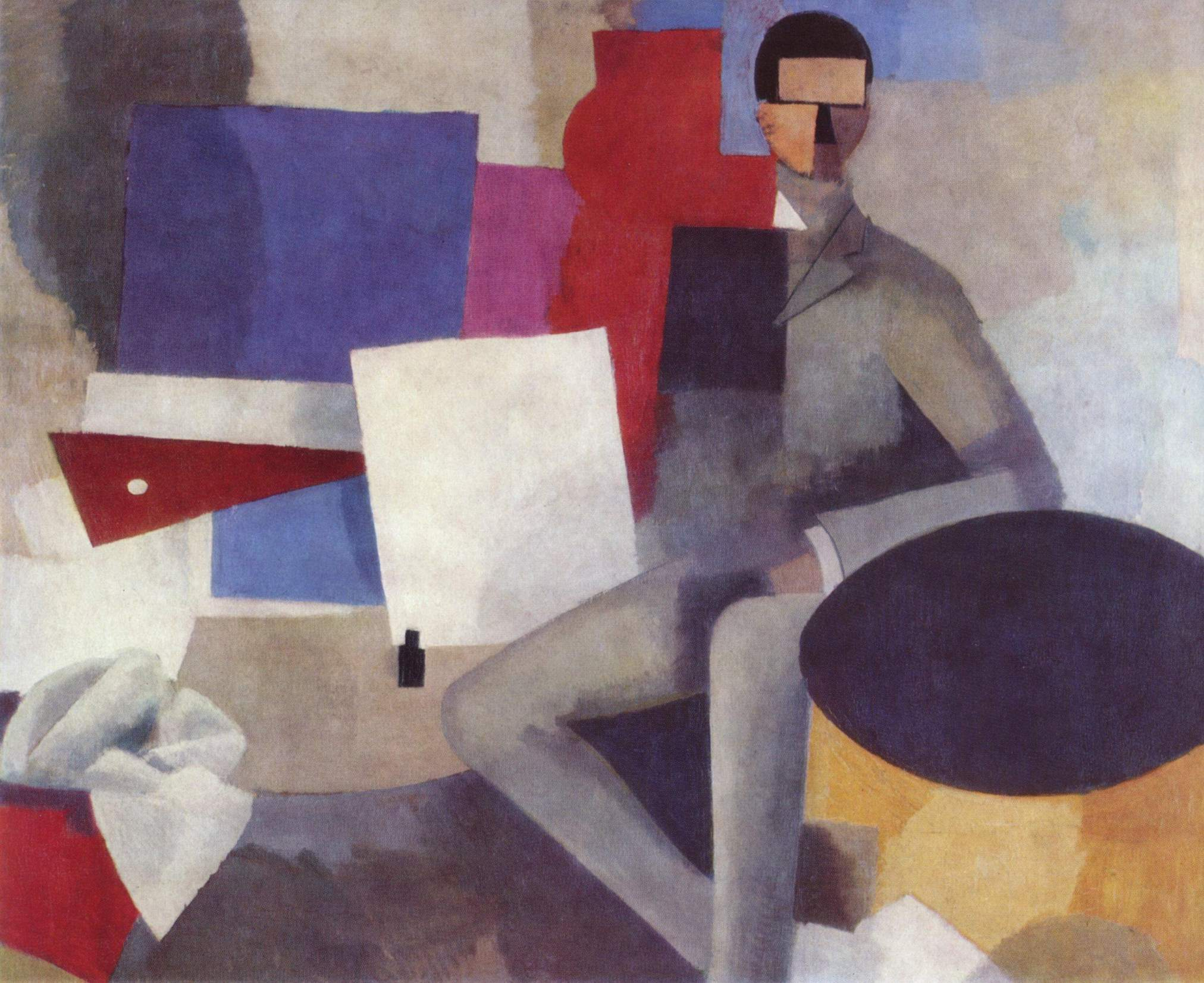
Homme assis, 1914, Musée des Beaux-Arts de Rouen

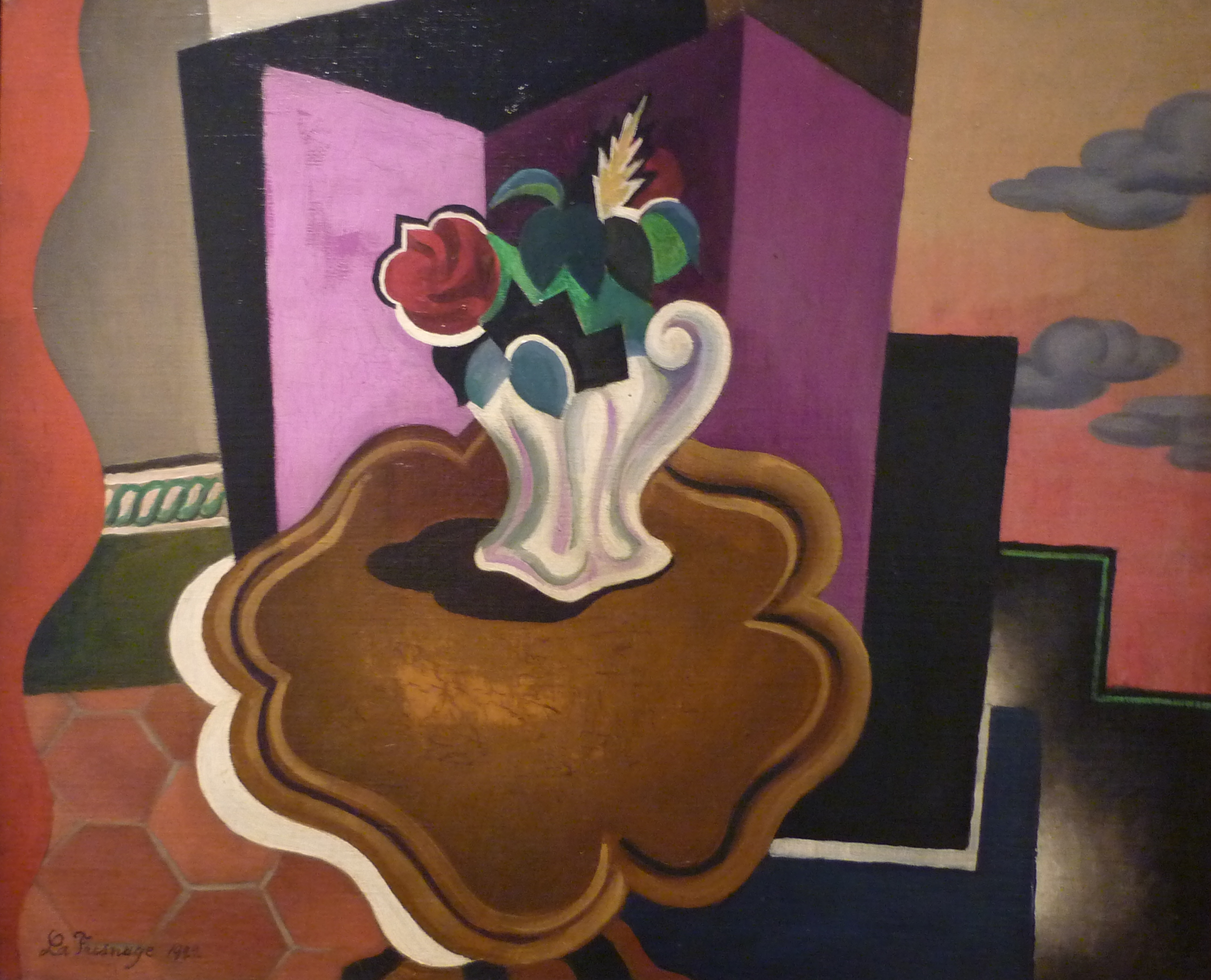
La table Louis-Philippe, 1922, Musée d'art moderne de Troyes
