= Artillery (disambiguation) =

Artillery refers to any engine used for the discharge of large projectiles during war.

Artillery may also refer to:

== Military ==
- Naval artillery, referring to any engine used for the discharge of large projectiles from ships
- Artillery Command (Italy)
- Artillery Corps (Egypt)
- Artillery Corps (Israel)
- Artillery Corps (Ireland)
- Royal Artillery

== Arts and entertainment ==
- Artillery game, a subgenre of computer and video games

=== Music ===
- Artillery (band), a Danish thrash metal band
- "Artillery", a song by Infected Mushroom

=== Fine arts ===
- Artillery (magazine), an American contemporary art magazine
- Artillery (Roger de la Fresnaye), a 1911 painting

=== Sports ===
- Artilleryman (horse), Australian thoroughbred racehorse

== See also ==
- List of artillery
- List of artillery by name
