= Laudaricus =

Hunnic chieftain

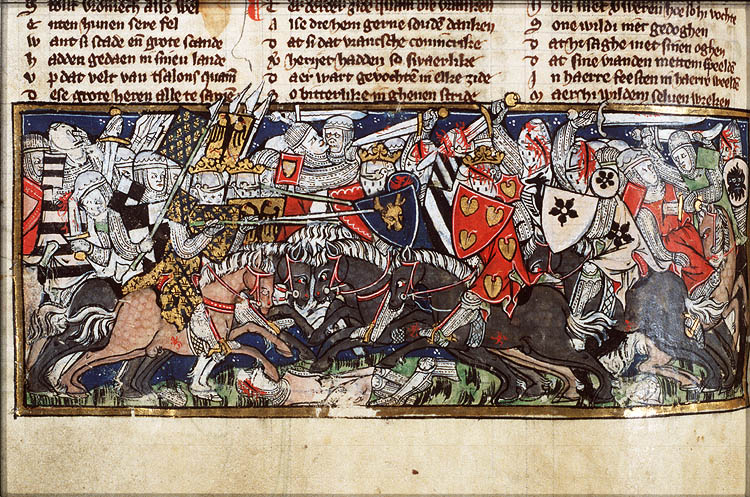
Battle of the Catalaunian Plains from a 13th-century miniature

Laudaricus (died 451) was a prominent Hunnic chieftain and general active in the first half of the 5th century.

== Biography ==
The Chronica Gallica of 511 under the year 451 noted him as Attila's blood relative (Latin: Cognatus Attilae), who died at the Battle of the Catalaunian Plains in 451 AD. He was the Huns' highest ranking casualty at this battle. The outcome of the battle is uncertain, but Hyun Jin Kim points out that the death of a commanding general in battle often meant defeat at the time.

The only relic found at the site of the battle (Châlons) was a Hunnish cauldron. Kim suggests this was likely used for the burial of Laudaricus, the Huns' most prestigious casualty.

== Etymology ==
M. Schönfeld considered the name to be of Germanic origin, *Lauda reiks (possibly "famous king"; compare Ludwig). Omeljan Pritsak proposed possible Gothicization and correction of the name by the chronicler from Turkic *Valda > Velda (< *Belda > Bleda). Otto J. Maenchen-Helfen thought the name was Germanic, *Laudareiks.

== Sources ==
- Maenchen-Helfen, Otto J. (1973). The World of the Huns: Studies in Their History and Culture. University of California Press. ISBN 9780520015968.
- Pritsak, Omeljan (1982). The Hunnic Language of the Attila Clan (PDF). Vol. IV. Cambridge, Massachusetts: Harvard Ukrainian Research Institute. ISSN 0363-5570. Archived from the original (PDF) on 2016-12-13.
