= Olibrones =

Roman allies mentioned by Jordanes (451 AD)

Olibrones or Olibriones are a group of Roman allies mentioned by Jordanes in his account of the Battle of the Catalaunian Plains in 451 AD between Aetius' allies of the Francii, Riparii, Sauromationes, Aremoriciani, Liticiani, Burgundians, Saxones, and Olibrones against the Huns under Attila the Hun.

(191) On the side of the Romans stood the Patrician Aëtius, on whom at that time the whole Empire of the West depended; a man of such wisdom that he had assembled warriors from everywhere to meet them on equal terms. Now these were his auxiliaries: Franks, Sarmatians, Armoricians, Liticians, Burgundians, Saxons, Riparians, Olibriones (once Romans soldiers and now the flower of the allied forces), and some other Celtic or German tribes.

Jordanes defines them as former Roman soldiers who are now mercenaries. The Olibrones could also have been Bucellarii or soldiers on Aetius' personal payroll.
