= Sangiban =

Fifth-century king of the Alans

Sangiban was a fifth-century Alan king at the time of Attila's invasion of Gaul (451). He was the successor of Goar as king of the Alan foederati settled in the region around Aurelianum (modern-day Orléans). According to Jordanes, Sangiban had promised Attila before the Battle of Châlons to open the city gates and deliver Aurelianum to the Huns. Suspecting this, the Romans and Visigoths put Sangiban in the center of the line opposing the Huns, where they could prevent him from defecting. Thus the Alans bore the main brunt of the Hunnic assault, while the Goths were able to flank the Huns and ultimately drive them back.

Jordanes does not record whether Sangiban survived the battle. But in any case, the Alans of Aurelianum were conquered by the Visigoths a few years later and incorporated into the Gothic Kingdom of Toulouse.

== See also ==
- Battle of Châlons
- Flavius Aetius
