= Musée des beaux-arts de Troyes =

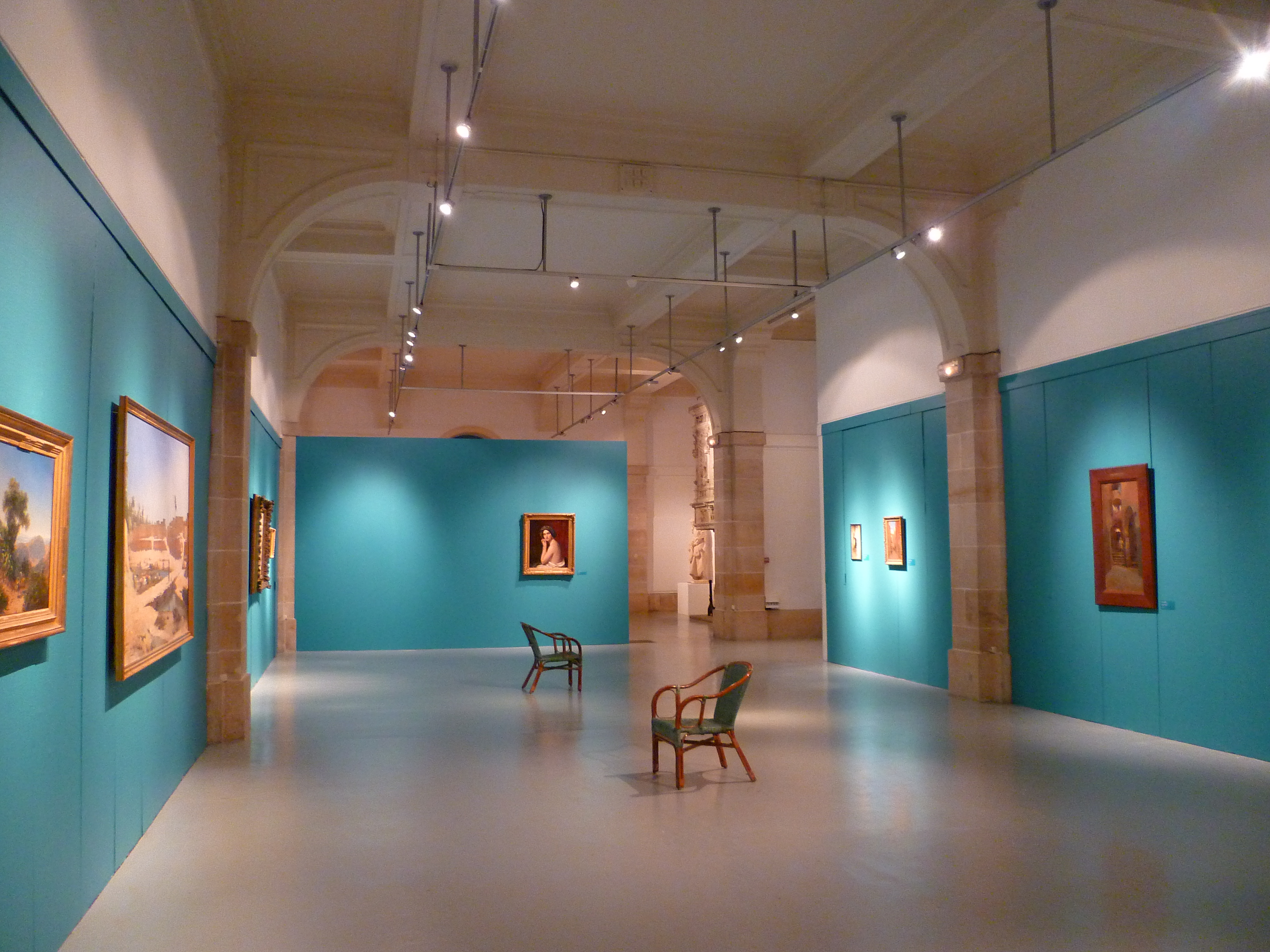
An exhibition room at the Musée des beaux-arts de Troyes

The Musée des beaux-arts de Troyes (officially known as the musée Saint-Loup) is one of the two main art and archaeology museums in Troyes, France – the other is the Musée d'art moderne de Troyes. From 1831, it has been housed in the former Abbey of Saint Loup.

It displays paintings of the fourteenth to nineteenth centuries (with strength in the seventeenth and eighteenth centuries), a strong representation of local medieval sculpture as well as busts of Louis XIV and Marie-Thérèse by the locally born sculptor François Girardon, and furniture and decorative arts, together with some locally recovered Roman antiquities, most notably the Treasure of Pouan, the grave goods of a fifth-century Germanic warrior, and the Apollo of Vaupoisson, a fine Gallo-Roman bronze.

== History ==
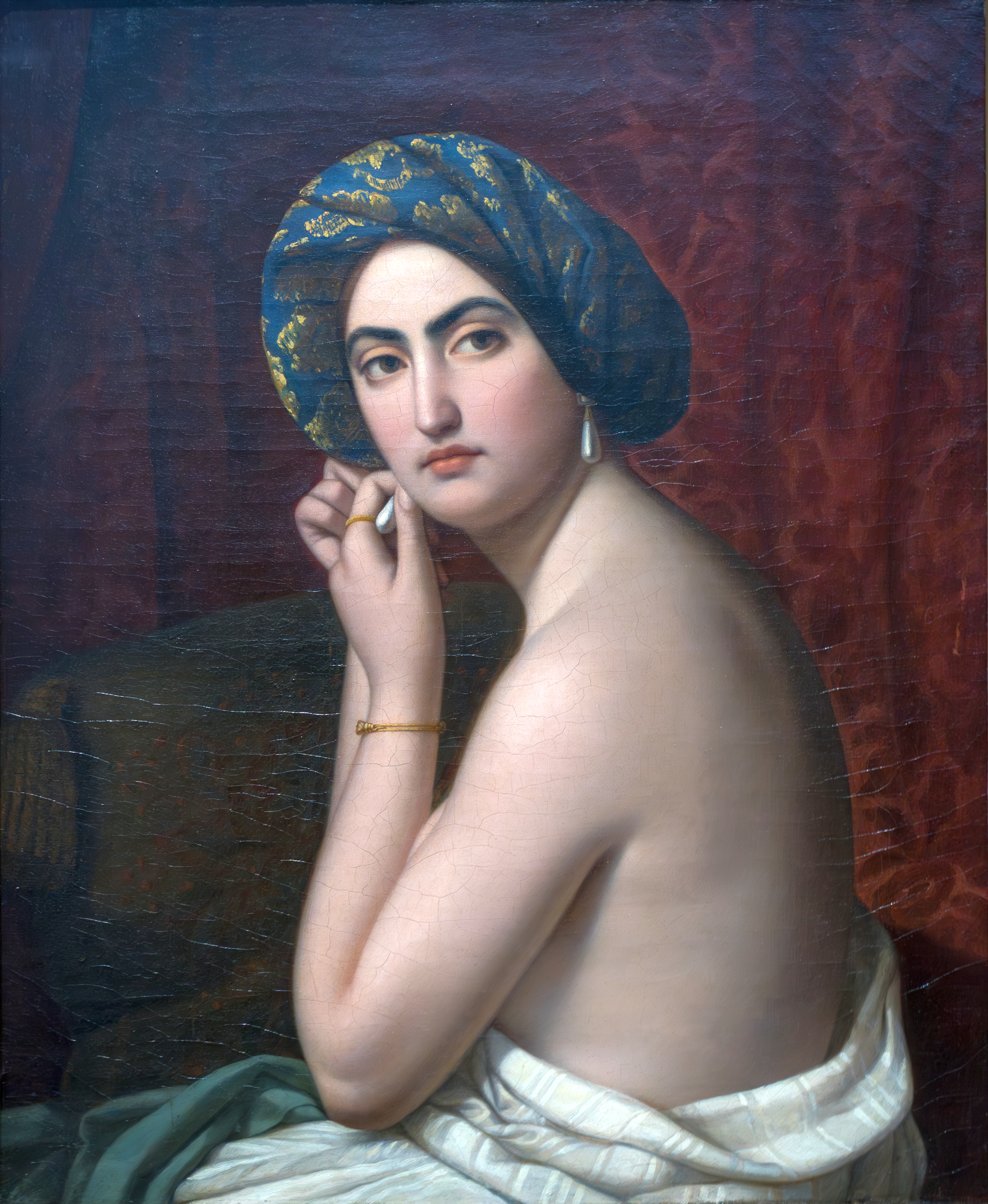
Odalisque by Sophie Gabriac (1843)

In 1792, the Departmental Assembly wanted to found a museum and asked the Convention for authorization to use the former abbey of Notre-Dame-Aux-Nonnains, commissioners were sent to the department to collect objects there to put in this museum. During this time the architect Milony gathered statues on the ground floor of the Saint-Loup abbey which came from suppressed churches and convents.

In 1829, the Academic Society of Aube renewed the project which had not succeeded, the city conceded the buildings of the Saint-Loup abbey which led to the opening of a first room in 1831. Seven paintings, ten statues and a mineralogical collection.

In 1833, Dominique Morlot's donation added 46 paintings, enamels, models and plans to this background. To these were added the revolutionary seizures kept at the Hôtel du Département. In 1850, there were 130 paintings.

To enlarge the museum, the Simart pavilion was erected in 1860, the Buissonnet pavilion in 1891 to enlarge the library, then the Audiffred pavilion in 1892.
