= Arther Ferrill =

- Born: November 26, 1938 (age 87); Enid, Oklahoma, U.S.
- Occupation: Non-fiction writer

Academic background
- Education: Wichita State University; University of Illinois Urbana-Champaign

Academic work
- Discipline: Ancient Rome and military history
- Institutions: University of Washington

Arther Ferrill (born 1938), now a professor emeritus of history at the University of Washington at Seattle, is a respected expert on ancient Rome and military history. He has written four books and is a regular contributor to MHQ: The Quarterly Journal of Military History (ISSN 1040-5992) and other periodicals, as an author and in review of other authors.

== Life and work ==
Born in Enid, Oklahoma, Ferrill earned a B.A. at the University of Wichita (now Wichita State University) in 1960. He went on to graduate study at the University of Illinois at Urbana-Champaign, where he received a master's degree in 1961 and a Ph.D. in 1964.

In The Fall of the Roman Empire: The Military Explanation (1998 ISBN 0-500-27495-9), Ferrill supports the claims of Vegetius, about increased "barbarisation" and "germanisation" helping to cause the collapse of the Western Roman Empire in the fifth century AD. He asserts that allowing barbarians to settle within Rome's borders, to act as a buffer zone against other barbarians, created friction and led to a decrease in the size of the Roman Empire's Borders. He also states that the Germans were recruited in such large numbers by the Western empire that they in fact changed it from a Roman to a German culture. For example, field army units would not use their helmets, the pilum was replaced, and the standard of drill declined, leading to a lack of military skill within the empire.

Among his other works are:

- Caligula: Emperor of Rome. Thames & Hudson, 1991. ISBN 0-500-25112-6
- The Origins of War: From the Stone Age to Alexander the Great. Thames & Hudson, 1985. Revised edition, Westview Press, 1997. ISBN 0-8133-3302-4
- Roman Imperial Grand Strategy. University Press of America, 1991. ISBN 0-8191-8445-4
