= Treasure of Pouan =

Burial hoard

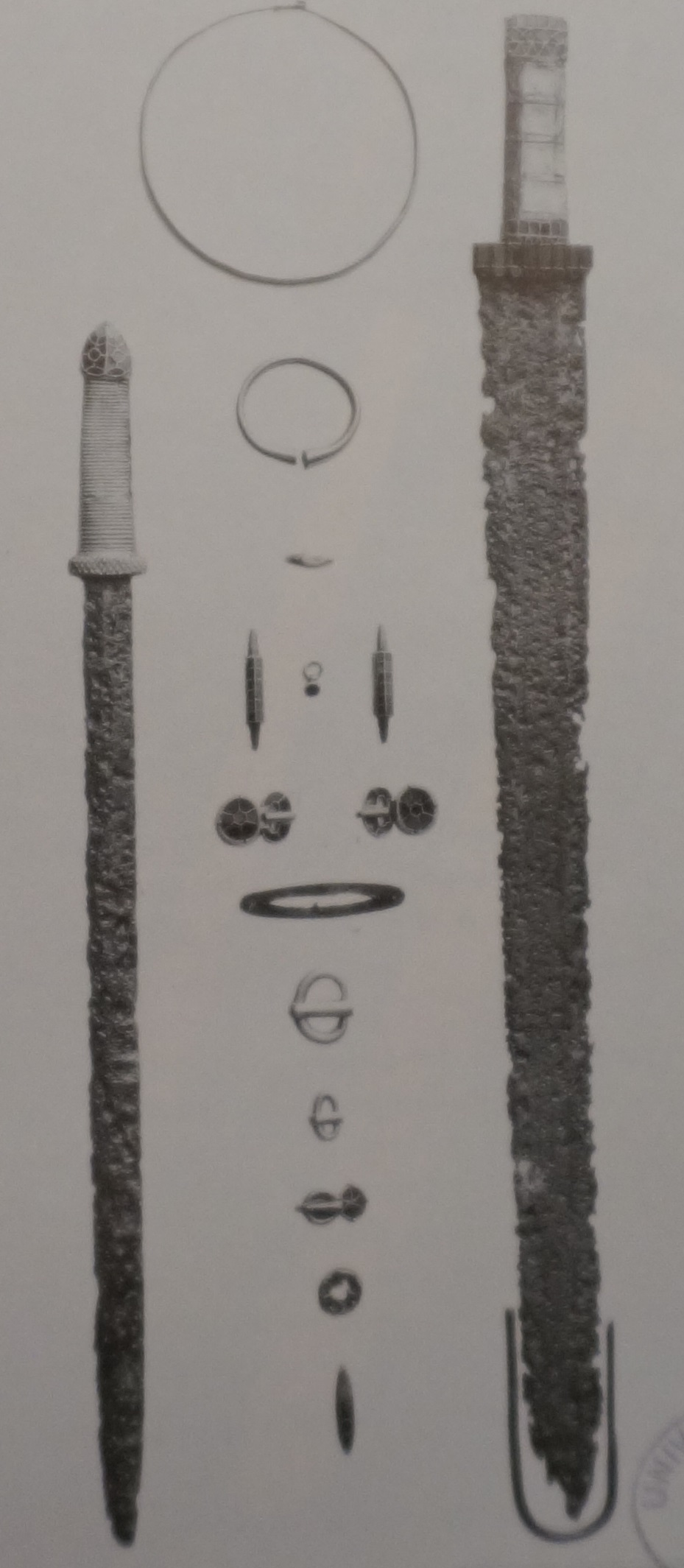
The "Treasure of Pouan".

The "Treasure of Pouan" consists of a number of gold and garnet cloisonné jewels and ornaments, buried with a skeleton uncovered in 1842 at Pouan-les-Vallées and identified as the burial of a 5th-century Germanic warrior. Although the warrior had in the past been identified as that of Theodoric I, modern historians generally believe that this is unlikely. The find is now housed in the Musée Saint-Loup (Musée d'Art d'Archéologie et de Sciences Naturelles), Troyes.

== Discovery and contents ==
The grave was accidentally uncovered in 1842 by a labourer at Pouan-les-Vallées (Aube), a French village in the canton of Arcis-sur-Aube on the south bank of the Aube. It consisted of a skeleton buried with a number of gold and garnet cloisonné jewels and ornaments, including a gold ring inscribed HEVA, and accompanied by two swords with hilts encased in gold.

The nature of the grave goods identified the burial as that of a Germanic warrior who lived in the 5th century.

== Linked to Theodoric I ==
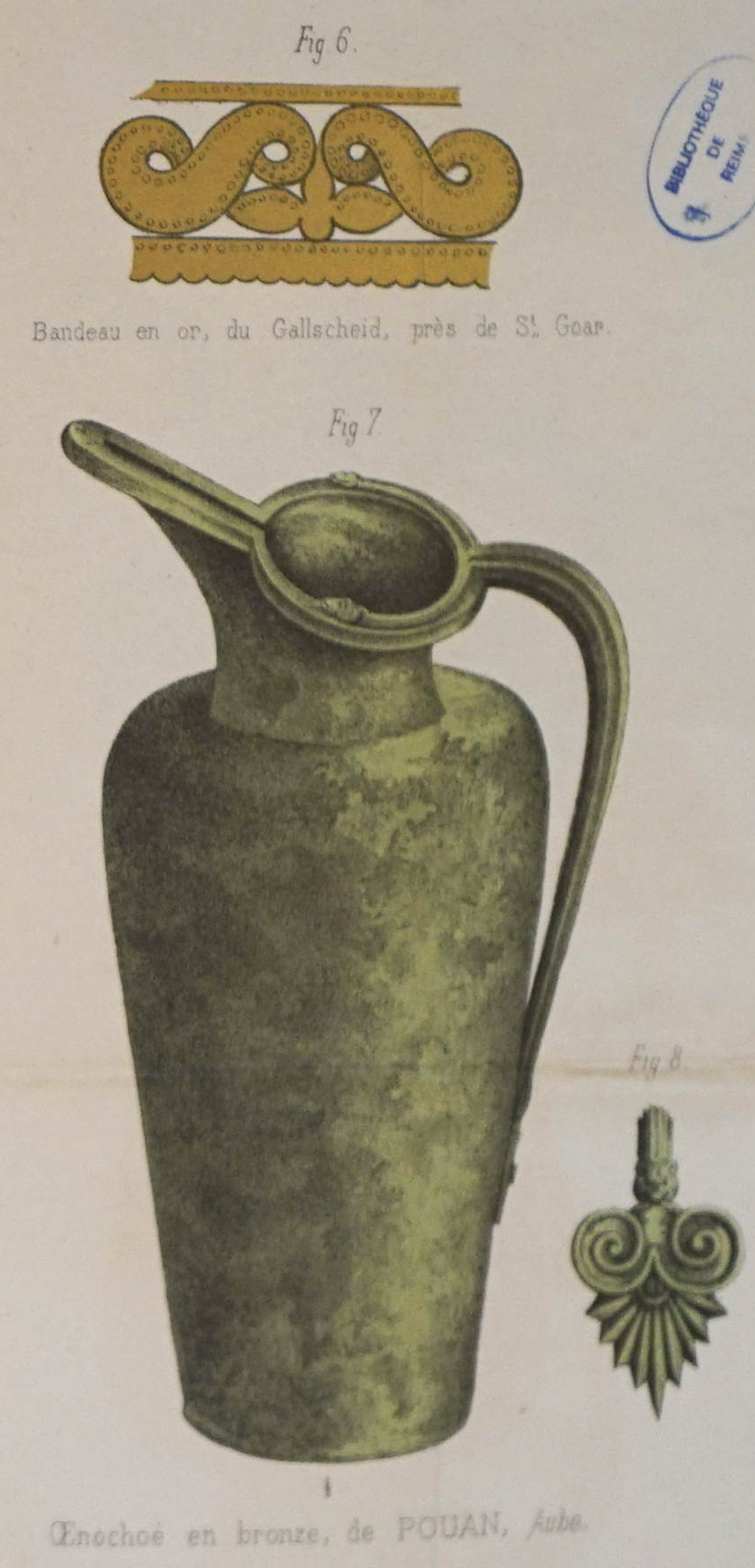
Oenochoe

The antiquarian who first described this find, Achille Peigné-Delacourt (1797–1881), optimistically claimed that the elite burial could be that of Theodoric I, the Visigoth king, who had undisputedly been slain in the nearby Battle of Châlons.

According to Peigné-Delacourt's theory, the corpse had been hastily interred by his followers, who meant to recover it, and that the body recovered and buried with ceremony at Tolosa (present-day Toulouse), the body described by Jordanes as found beneath a mound of corpses and borne away with heroic songs in sight of the enemy, was not actually that of Theodoric. Aëtius convinced Theodoric's son Thorismund to return home swiftly and secure the throne for himself before his brothers could begin a civil war. Thorismund quickly returned to Tolosa, buried the anonymously-recovered corpse with honours and became king without resistance.

John Man describes the motivation imagined by Peigné-Delacourt,

"...if Thorismund, eager to claim the throne over his brothers, might have had an interest in finding a corpse, any corpse, that could be identified, rightly or wrongly, as his father's, and buried quickly, with a show of grief, and instant acclamation for Thorismund as king".

== Modern view ==
In the last century, professional historians Thomas Hodgkin and later J.B. Bury have generally expressed their scepticism over this identification. Other chance finds scattered over the area of Pouan and its neighboring village Villette— including two small bronze vases, a cup, a gilt-bronze ewer, blades and horse-trappings— support the local perception that these fields are the Catalaunian fields of the decisive battle in 451, usually identified with Châlons-en-Champagne.
