= Iaroslav Lebedynsky =

French historian

Iaroslav Lebedynsky, born in Paris in 1960, is a French historian of Ukrainian origin, a specialist in ancient warrior cultures of the steppe and the Caucasus, and a prolific author in that field. He has also translated seven books on history or languages of this region into French.

Since 1997, he has taught Ukrainian history at the National Institute of Oriental Languages and Civilizations (INALCO) in Paris. Lebedynsky and Iryna Dmytrychyn are the editors of the series Présence Ukrainienne published by L'Harmattan.

He leads the research circle Gallia-Sarmatia which aims to study the traces left by the Sarmatians and Alans in the West. He also co-directs, with Lora Arys-Djanaïéva, the collection Voice of the Caucasus whose objective is, through various topics, to communicate this region with many influences.

Iaroslav Lebedynsky grew up in a cultured and polyglot family who contributed to his intellectual awakening. The Ukrainian part of his family was originally from central Ukraine and completely Russified. He learnt Russian and was familiar with Russian culture from an early age. Only later, he discovered his Ukrainian heritage.

With a very early passion for history, Iaroslav Lebedynsky does not see it without involving other disciplines of human knowledge. It was his interest in Ukraine and the role of its territory in history, which led to him developing a passion for the ancient cultures of the steppe. From this passion, he went on to scientific study.

Regarding the history of Ukraine, he regretted the proliferation of pseudo-historical works that reflect his view on "an inferiority complex of Ukrainians who, ignoring their own history and not wanting to be satisfied, construct compensatory myths". In France, the inquiry into the misinformation about the history of Ukraine conducted in 2001 by Iaroslav Lebedynsky and his colleague Iryna Dmytrychyn, led to the creation of the collection, Présence Ukrainienne.

== Publications ==
- Les armes cosaques et caucasiennes, Éditions du Portail, Paris, 1990.
- Les armes orientales, Éditions du Portail, Paris, 1992.
- La collection d'armes de l'empereur de Russie Alexandre II, Édition du Portail, Paris, 1993.
- Histoire des Cosaques, Terre Noire, Paris, 1995.
- Les armes traditionnelles de l'Europe centrale, Éditions du Portail, Paris, 1996.
- Co-author with Vladimir Kouznetsov, Les Alains, Errance, Paris, 1997 (2 ed, 2005).
- Co-author with Vladimir Kouznetsov, Les Chrétiens disparus du Caucase, Errance, Paris, 1999.
- Armes et guerriers barbares, Errance, Paris, 2001.
- Les Scythes, Errance, Paris, 2001.
- Le Prince Igor. Paris: L'Harmattan, 2001.
- [Introduction and notes for :] Guillaume Le Vasseur de Beauplan, Description d'Ukranie, L'Harmattan, Paris, 2002.
- Les Sarmates. Paris: Errance, 2002.
- Les Nomades, les peuples nomades de la steppe des origines aux invasions mongoles, IXe siècle av. J.-C. - XIIIe siècle apr. J.-C. Paris: Errance, 2003 (2nd ed., 2007).
- Les Cosaques, une société guerrière entre libertés et pouvoirs. Ukraine, 1490-1790. Paris: Errance, 2004.
- Les Cimmériens. Paris: Errance, 2004.
- Les Indo-Européens: Faits, débats, solutions. Paris: Errance, 2006 (2nd ed., 2009).
- Les Saces: Les « Scythes » d'Asie, viii^{e} siècle av. J.-C. – iv^{e} siècle apr. J.-C. Paris: Errance, 2006. ISBN 2-87772-337-2.
- Co-author with Katalin Escher, Le dossier Attila, Errance, Paris, 2007.
- Armes et guerriers du Caucase, L'Harmattan, Paris, 2008.
- Ukraine, une histoire en questions, L'Harmattan, Paris, 2008.
- De l'épée Scythe au sabre Mongol, Errance, Paris, 2008.
- Scythes, Sarmates et Slaves, L'Harmattan, Paris, 2009.
- Temoignages anciens sur les Tcherkesses, L'Harmattan, Paris, 2009.
- Les Amazones, mythe et réalité des femmes guerrières chez les anciens nomades de la steppe, Errance, Paris, 2009.
- Sarmates et Alains face à Rome, Les Éditions Maison, Clermont-Ferrand, 2010.
- Skoropadsky et l'édification de l'État ukrainien, L'Harmattan, Paris, 2010.
- La « constitution » ukrainienne de 1710, L'Harmattan, Paris, 2010.
- La campagne d'Attila en Gaule, LEMME edit, Clermont-Ferrand, 2011. ISBN 978-2917575215.
- Les Tamgas, Errance, Paris, 2011. ISBN 978-2877724654.
- Sur les traces des Alains et Sarmates en Gaule, L'Harmattan, Paris, 2011. ISBN 978-2296556126.
- Les seigneurs de la steppe, Archéologie Nouvelle, Lacapelle-Marival, 2012. ISBN 978-2953397369.
- La grande invasion des Gaules, LEMME edit, Clermont-Ferrand, 2012. ISBN 978-2917575307.
- Les khazars : VIIe-XIe siècles, Chamalières-sur-Loire: LEMME edit, 2025. ISBN 978-2492818356.
