= Musée d'art moderne de Troyes =

Coordinates: 48°17′59″N 4°04′49″E

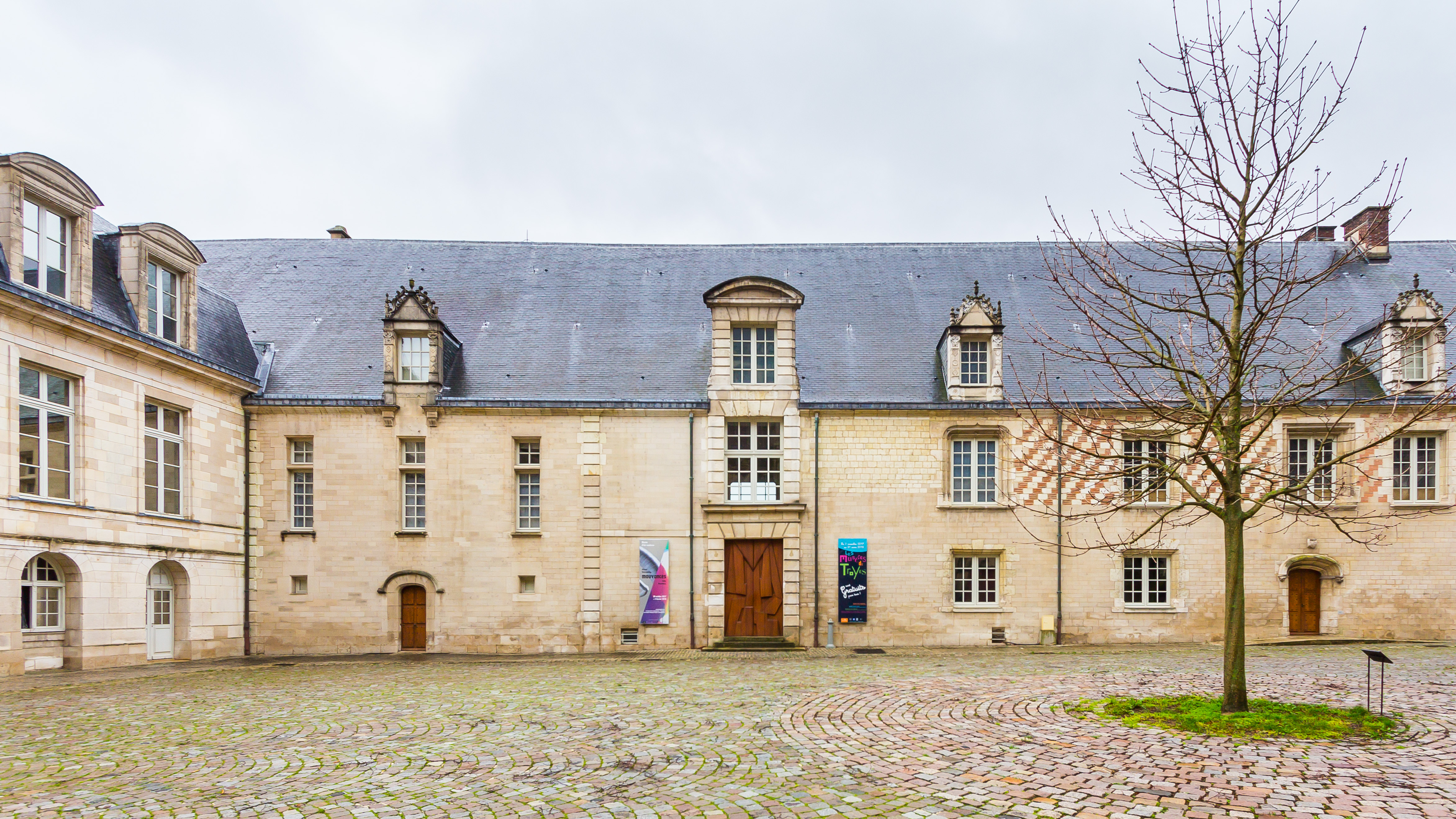
Entrance of the museum

The Musée d'art moderne de Troyes is one of the two main museums in the French city of Troyes – the other is the Musée des Beaux-Arts de Troyes. It is located in the city's former 16th- and 17th-century, episcopal palace. It was opened in 1982 by president François Mitterrand following Pierre and Denise Lévy's 1976 donation of several modern artworks to their home-town of Troyes. After being closed for several years for works, it opens again in 2023 for its Act I.

The Musée d'Art Moderne de Troyes is located in the town of Troyes in Champagne-Ardenne. Founded in 1982, its collection of modern and contemporary art consists of around 3,000 works by more than 200 artists. The museum is in the Hôtel de Vauluisant, a historic building dating from the 16th century. The museum also organizes temporary contemporary art exhibitions.
