= Artillery (Roger de La Fresnaye) =

Painting by Roger de la Fresnaye

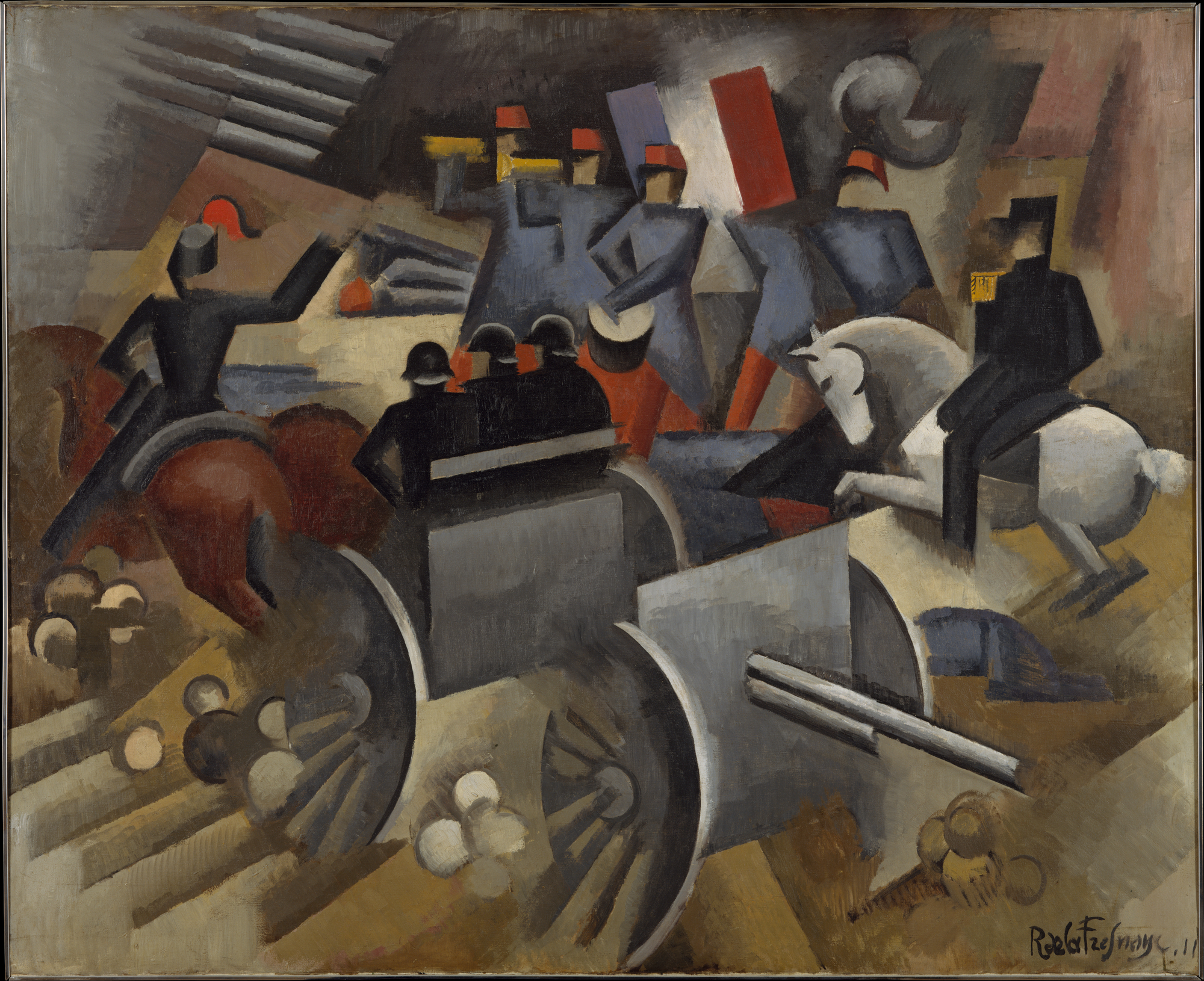
- Artist: Roger de La Fresnaye
- Year: 1911
- Medium: Oil on canvas
- Dimensions: 130.2 cm × 159.4 cm (51.3 in × 62.8 in)
- Location: Metropolitan Museum of Art; New York

Artillery is an oil on canvas painting by French artist Roger de La Fresnaye, from 1911. It depicts French soldiers, artillerymen, a French officer, and a field gun (an artillery piece) under tow. The work is in the collection of the Metropolitan Museum of Art, in New York.
