= Pouan-les-Vallées =

Commune in Grand Est, France

- Commune
- Location of Pouan-les-Vallées
- Location within France Location within Grand Est
- Coordinates: 48°32′32″N 4°03′55″E
- Country: France
- Region: Grand Est
- Department: Aube
- Arrondissement: Troyes
- Canton: Arcis-sur-Aube

Government
  - Mayor (2020–2026): Jean-Claude Jactat
- Area^{1}: 16.61 km^{2} (6.41 sq mi)
- Elevation: 75 m (246 ft)
- Highest elevation: 109 m (358 ft)
- Lowest elevation: 82 m (269 ft)
- Population (2023): 498
  - Density: 30.0/km^{2} (77.7/sq mi)
- Time zone: UTC+01:00 (CET)
  - Summer (DST): UTC+02:00 (CEST)
- INSEE/Postal code: 10299 /10700
- ^{1} French Land Register data, which excludes lakes, ponds, glaciers > 1 km^{2} (0.386 sq mi or 247 acres) and river estuaries.

Pouan-les-Vallées (French pronunciation: [pwɑ̃ le vale]) is a commune in the Aube department in north-central France.

== Population ==
Historical population
Year	Pop.	±% p.a.
1968	424	—
1975	437	+0.43%
1982	453	+0.52%
1990	468	+0.41%
1999	444	−0.58%
2007	484	+1.08%
2012	532	+1.91%
2017	539	+0.26%
2023	498	−1.31%
Source: INSEE

== See also ==
- Communes of the Aube department
- Treasure of Pouan
