= Hyun Jin Kim =

Australian Academic

- Born: 1982 (age 43–44); Seoul, South Korea
- Education: University of Oxford
- Scientific career
- Fields: Classics; Sinology
- Workplaces: University of Melbourne

Hyun Jin Kim FAHA (born 1982) is an Australian academic, scholar and author.

He was born in Seoul and raised in Auckland, New Zealand. Kim received his Doctor of Philosophy degree from the University of Oxford. He started learning Latin, German, and French when he was 10, and was urged to study Ancient Greek in university by his father. He is a scholar of ancient Greece, Rome and China. Kim has published several works on Eurasian/ Central Asian peoples, such as the Huns. In 2019, Kim was elected a Fellow of the Australian Academy of the Humanities.

His work focuses chiefly on comparative analyses of ancient Greece/Rome and China. His first major work on such topic was Ethnicity and Foreigners in Ancient Greece and China, published in 2009.

== Selected list of works ==
- Kim, Hyun Jin (2009). Ethnicity and Foreigners in Ancient Greece and China. London: Duckworth Books. ISBN 9780715638071.
- Kim, Hyun Jin (2013). The Huns, Rome and the Birth of Europe. Cambridge: Cambridge University Press. ISBN 9781107067226.
- Kim, Hyun Jin (2016). The Huns. Abingdon-on-Thames: Taylor & Francis. ISBN 9781317340904.
- Kim, Hyun Jin (2017). Eurasian Empires in Antiquity and the Early Middle Ages: Contact and Exchange Between the Graeco-Roman World, Inner Asia and China. Cambridge: Cambridge University Press. ISBN 9781107190412.
- Kim, Hyun Jin (2018). Geopolitics in Late Antiquity: The Fate of Superpowers from China to Rome. Abingdon-on-Thames: Taylor & Francis. ISBN 9781351869263.
- Kim, Hyun Jin; Lieu, Samuel N.C.; McLaughlin, Raoul (2021). Rome and China Points of Contact. Abingdon-on-Thames: Taylor & Francis. ISBN 9781315280714.
- Cha, Hyeonji; Kim, Hyun Jin (2022). South Korea's Origins and Early Relations with the United States: The Lynchpin of Hegemonic Power. Abingdon-on-Thames: Taylor & Francis. ISBN 9781000578867.
