= Sack of Padua =

Destruction of the Roman city by the Huns (452 CE)

Hunnic invasion of Italy
- Part of the Hunnic invasion of Italy
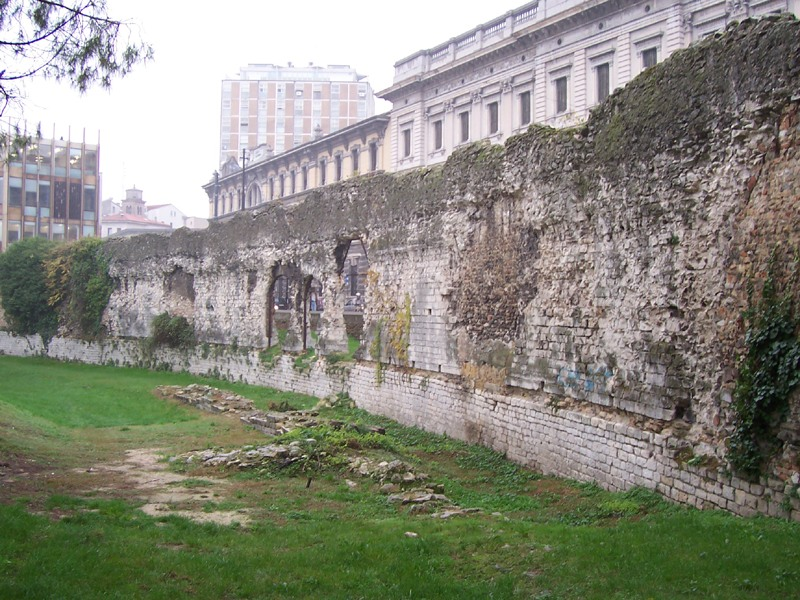
- Remnant of wall of Roman arena in Padua
Date	452 AD
Location	Padua, Western Roman Empire
Result	Hunnic victory; Hunnic invasion of Italy

Belligerents
Hunnic Empire	Western Roman Empire

Commanders and leaders
Attila the Hun	Unknown

Strength
Unknown	Unknown

Casualties and losses
Unknown	Padua sacked

The sack of Padua was carried out by Attila and his Huns and Germanic allies. It was part of the wars fought by Attila in Italy in 452 AD, during his invasion of the peninsula. It followed the Sack of Aquileia and preceded the Siege of Milan.

== Background ==
Aetius, who had grown up among the Huns, was hoping to cooperate with them against the Visigoths. He therefore left the mountain passes unguarded, but Attila, seeking the hand of Honoria, and part of the Western Empire as dowry, crossed them into northern Italy. In 452 the Huns entered the plains around Padua, and sacked Aquileia, an important Roman city which had historically been subject to sieges on account of its position on the "gates" of Italy.

== Siege ==
After sacking Aquileia in 452, they proceeded through the Paduan plains to Padua, in present-day Veneto. They attacked the city in the same year. Padua was sacked and suffered severely from this attack. Following the fall of Padua, the Huns conquered in swift succession Mantua, Vicentia, Verona, Brescia and Bergamo before reaching the former Western Roman capital Mediolanum, which they also besieged and captured.

Legend has it that the Roman survivors of the sieges of Aquileia, Verona, and Padua fled to the Venetian islands, where they founded Venice.
