= Devnya =

Devnya Девня
- Location of Devnya
- Coordinates: 43°13′N 27°34′E
- Country: Bulgaria
- Province (Oblast): Varna

Government
  - Mayor: Svilen Shitov
- Elevation: 48 m (157 ft)

Population (31.12.2009)
  - Total: 8,383
- Time zone: UTC+2 (EET)
  - Summer (DST): UTC+3 (EEST)
- Postal Code: 9160
- Area code: 0519

Devnya (Bulgarian: Девня [ˈdɛvnʲɐ]) is a town in Varna Province, Northeastern Bulgaria, located about 25 km away to the west from the city of Varna and The Black Sea Coast. It is the administrative centre of the homonymous Devnya Municipality. As of December 2009, the town had a population of 8,383.

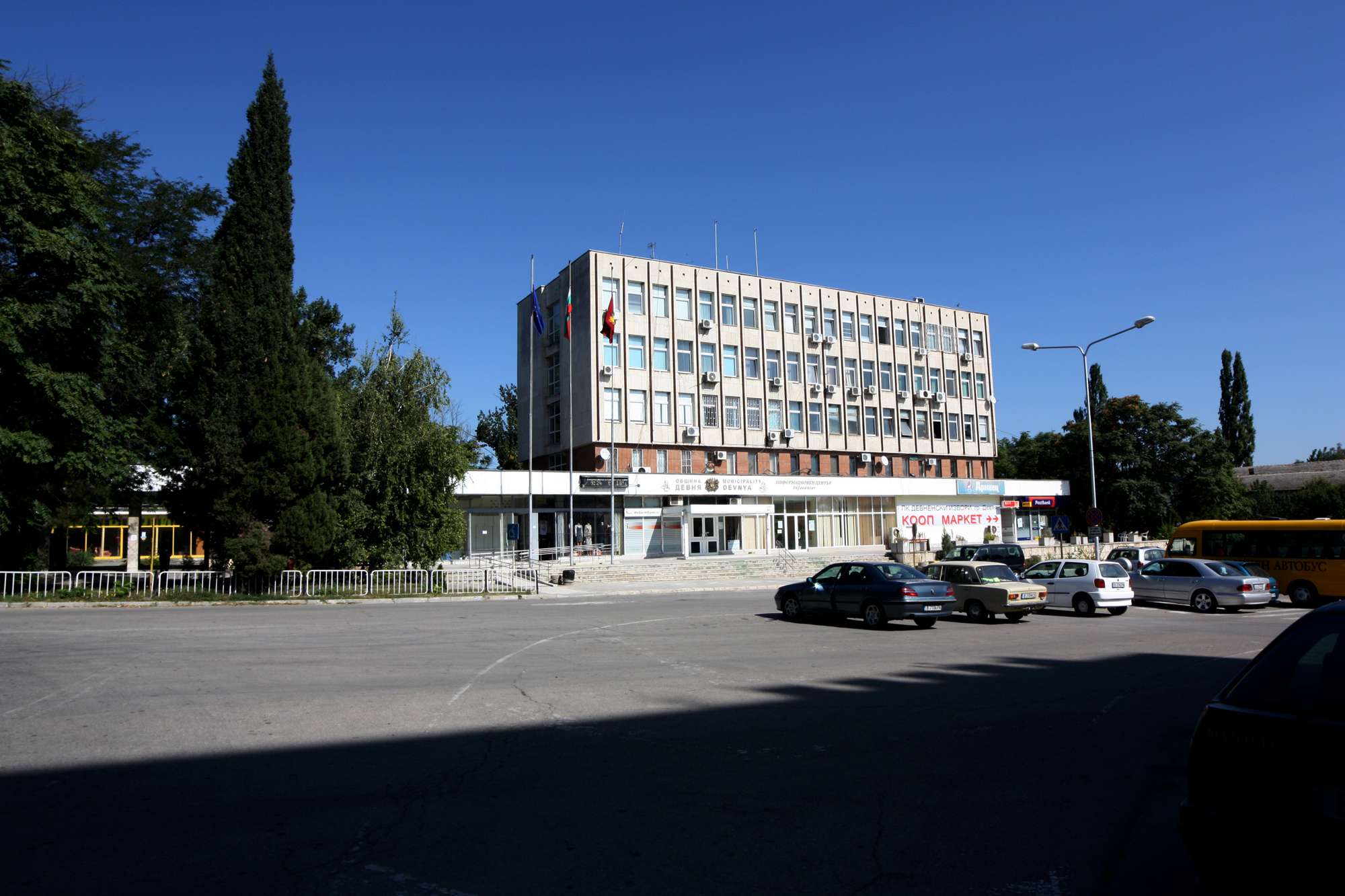
Devnya town hall

It lies at the western shore of Lake Beloslav in the northeastern end of the Devnya Valley and along the southern slopes of the Dobruja Plateau, in the close proximity to the Black Sea. Two rivers, Devnya and Provadiya, empty into the lake nearby. The landscape is mostly karst with 30 karst springs with a debit of 3700 litres per second used for water supply for Devnya, Varna and the local industries. One of the largest springs, feeding a pool, is open for visitors. Along the river mouths there are extensive wetlands once rich in fish and crabs but now polluted by industrial waste.

Local landmarks include Roman remains of ancient Marcianopolis, including an amphitheatre and the Mosaics Museum, featuring some exquisite Roman mosaics in situ, and Pobiti Kamani ("stone forest"), a rock phenomenon to the east.

== History ==
=== Ancient history ===
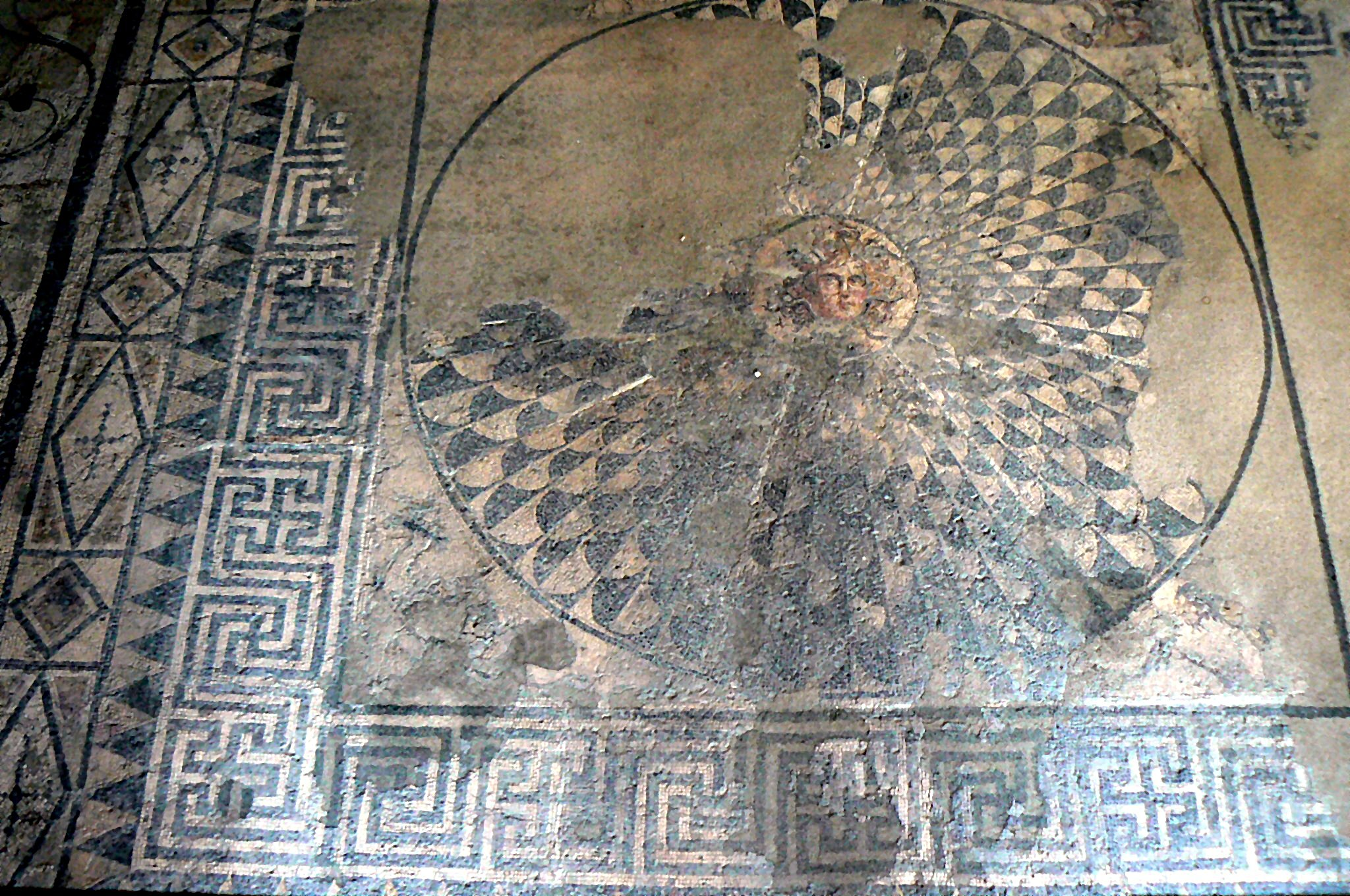
A mosaic featuring an image of the gorgon Medusa in Devnya's Mosaics Museum

Devnya lies at the site of the Ancient Roman and Early Byzantine city of Marcianopolis (Μαρκιανούπολις) founded by Roman Emperor Trajan after the Second Dacian War, which ended in 106. The city was named after Trajan's sister, Ulpia Marciana. An important strategic centre, the city was part of Roman Thrace until 187–193, and then belonged to Moesia inferior. Marcianopolis's prosperity under the Severan Dynasty was ended by a Gothic raid in 248-249 and subsequent barbarian invasions from the north.

Under Emperor Diocletian Marcianopolis became the centre of the province Moesia Secunda of the Diocese of Thrace, and was rebuilt thoroughly in the late 3rd and early 4th century. It grew in importance at the expense of neighbouring Odessos (Varna) in the 4th century. The city was an important episcopal centre and a basilica from the period was excavated in the 20th century. During Emperor Valens' conflict with the Goths (366–369), Marcianopolis was a temporary capital of the empire and the largest city of Thrace according to a source from the period.

The House of Antiope, a Late Roman villa decorated with several beautiful floor mosaics has been excavated and is on public display. The villa was constructed in the late 3rd or early 4th century AD.

Despite the regular barbarian attacks, Marcianopolis remained an important centre until an Avar raid finally destroyed it in 614–615, although it still continued to be mentioned in maps until much later.

=== Middle Ages, Ottoman rule and liberated Bulgaria ===
As the Slavs settled in the Balkans in the 7th century they called the ruins of the ancient city Devina, from Proto-Indo-European *dhew-(i)na or *dhew-eina ("spring, source, stream, current") through Thracian, but associated with Slavic deva ("virgin"). A small Bulgar fortress existed at the place during the Middle Ages, possibly built under Omurtag in the 9th century and extended to the north in the 10th or 11th century. A large 9th-century Bulgar mass grave has been excavated.

After the Ottoman invasion of the Balkans the fortress was destroyed and abandoned, with the settlement moved to the west. A village by the name of Devne is mentioned in a tax register from 1573, with other forms of the name also attested by foreign and Bulgarian travellers in the 16th and 17th century, sometimes used to designate the river.

After the Liberation of Bulgaria from Ottoman rule the village was called Devne until 1934, when it was substituted by the form Devnya. The lower river Devnya was a traditional industrial centre since Ottoman times with numerous watermills serving much or riverless Southern Dobruja, a breadbasket area. On 27 August 1969 the town of Devnya was formed through the merger of the villages Devnya, Reka Devnya and Povelyanovo.

== Economy ==
Devnya is part of the Varna-Devnya Industrial Complex and a number of important heavy industry facilities are located in or near the town, making it a chemical industry centre of national importance. Among these are:

- Solvay Sodi AD — sodium bicarbonate, dense and light soda ash, largest soda plant in Europe (2007); part of the Solvay Group
- Agropolychim AD — nitrogen, phosphate and compound fertilizers, exports to Europe (49% of output), the Americas (11%), Asia (9%), and supplying more than 50% of the Bulgarian market, member of the Acid & Fertilizers LLC (joint venture of Harland Investments Ltd., United States, with 99%, and Belgium's Cumerio with 1% share).
- Polimeri AD — liquid chlorine, dichloroethane, sodium hydroxide (caustic soda), hydrochloric acid, chlorine lime, carbide, and emulsion polyvinyl chloride; AKB Fores portfolio company
- Devnya Cement — cement; part of Italcementi
- Devnya Sugar Plant (Litex Sugar) — refined sugar; part of Litex Commerce JSC
- Deven AD — thermal power plant (steam station owned by Solvay Sodi)
- Provadsol AD — brine (near Provadiya; owned by Solvay Sodi)
- Devnya Limestone AD (owned by Solvay Sodi)

Devnya is also a major transportation hub with the inland Port of Varna West and two railway stations. The Devnya industrial cluster produced 14% of the Bulgarian exports by volume (2004). The privatization of Solvay Sodi AD (formerly Sodi Devnya EAD) was the second largest cash privatization deal in the nation after 1989.

== Municipality ==
Devnya is also the seat of Devnya municipality (part of Varna Province), which includes the following 2 villages:

- Kipra
- Padina

== Honour ==
Devnya Valley on Livingston Island in the South Shetland Islands, Antarctica is named after Devnya. Also there's a Devnya street in Alverca, Vila Franca de Xira, Portugal, its twin city.
