= Museum of Mosaics, Devnya =

Coordinates: 43°13′31.40″N 27°35′5.99″E

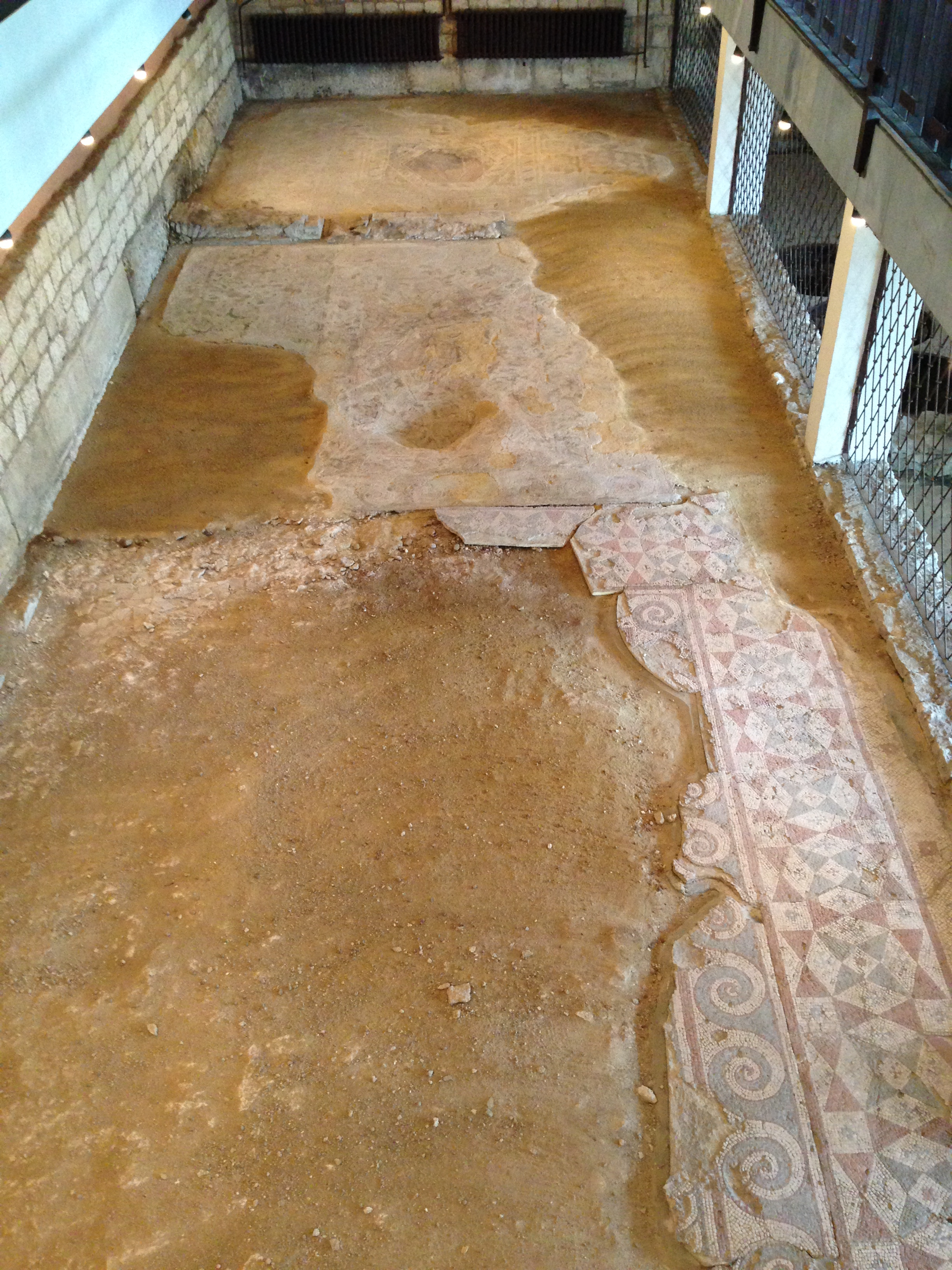
Mosaic floor of peristyle, House of Antiope

The Museum of Mosaics (Bulgarian: Музей на мозайките, Muzey na mozaykite) is a museum in the town of Devnya in Varna Province, northeastern Bulgaria. The museum, built on top of a large ruined Roman villa from Late Antiquity, exhibits mosaics from the Roman and early Byzantine city of Marcianopolis, as well as other archaeological artifacts.

== Villa and museum ==
The museum was founded as a result of archaeological research beginning in 1976, which uncovered the House of Antiope, a Late Roman villa decorated with floor mosaics. The villa was constructed in the late 3rd or early 4th century AD, perhaps during the rule of Roman Emperor Constantine the Great (r. 306–337). Constructed on the site of earlier buildings destroyed during the Gothic raids in 250–251, it was abandoned in the 7th century due to Avar and Slavic invasions.

The villa is nearly square in shape, measuring 37.15 m × 37.75 m (121.9 ft × 123.9 ft). It features 21 rooms situated around an inner courtyard (atrium) with a well; the rooms have a total area of 1,409 m^{2} (15,170 sq ft). The museum lies in a small park, with a well-preserved Roman street crossing under the building. Around the museum are several ancient walls, which, along with the villa, constitute most of the preserved ruins of Marcianopolis. The museum building only covers the western part of the villa; its eastern wing and the atrium are not covered. Many of the villa's walls were decorated with frescoes and stucco, while the floors of the portico and five premises were covered by elaborate mosaics. In addition to mosaics, the museum displays items pertaining to the Roman villa itself and to the life of its inhabitants.

The modern museum building was built to the design of architect Kamen Goranov. Museum curator Anastas Angelov has criticised the construction, claiming that 90% of the building's weight is carried by the Roman ruins. As of 2008, visible cracks were threatening the building, which was also sinking due to groundwater. In 2005, the museum was visited by a record 10,000 people; in 2006, the annual visitors were around 8,000. The Museum of Mosaics in Devnya is listed as #10 among the 100 Tourist Sites of Bulgaria.

== Mosaics ==
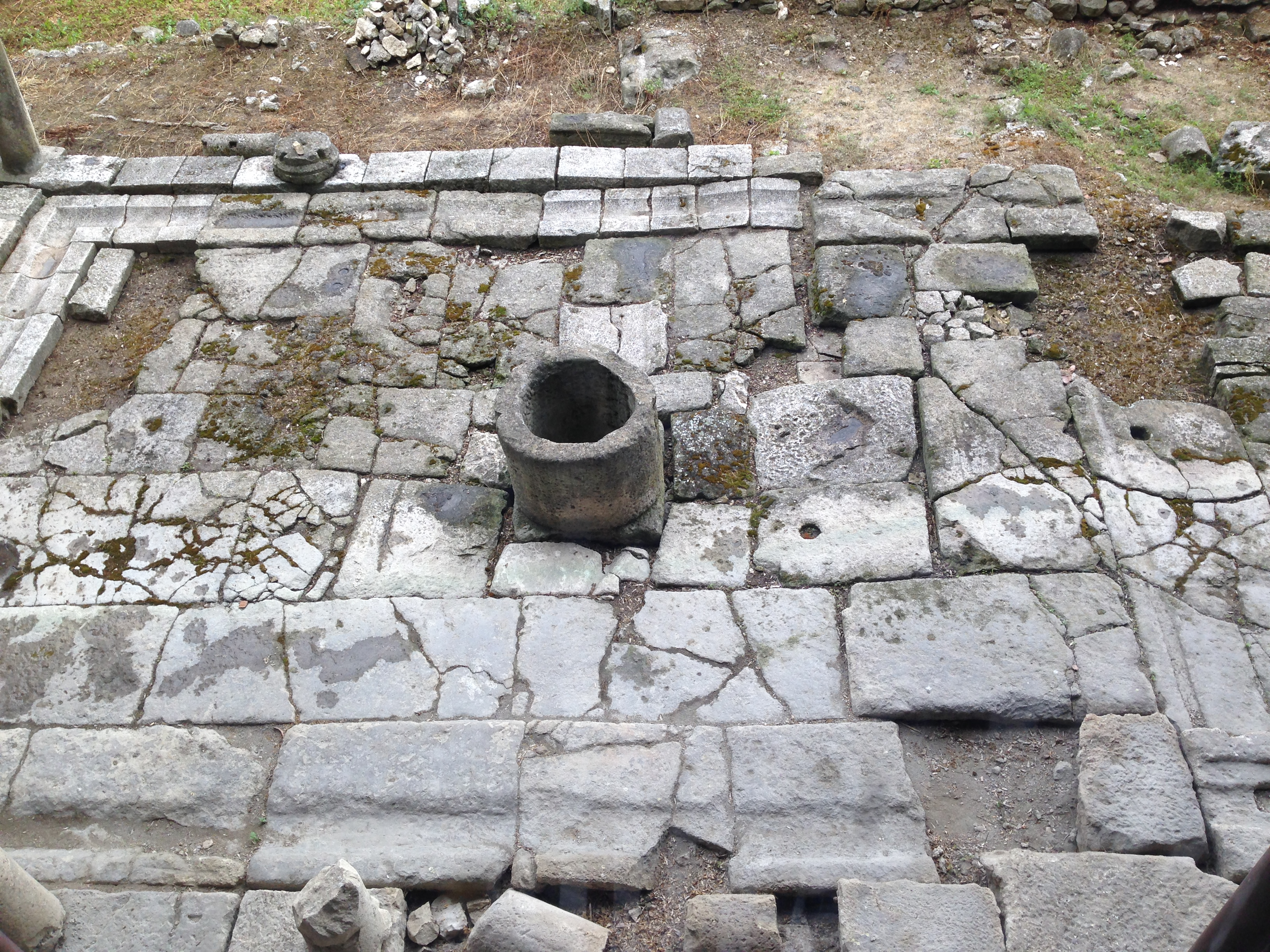
Atrium basin of House of Antiope, Marcianopolis

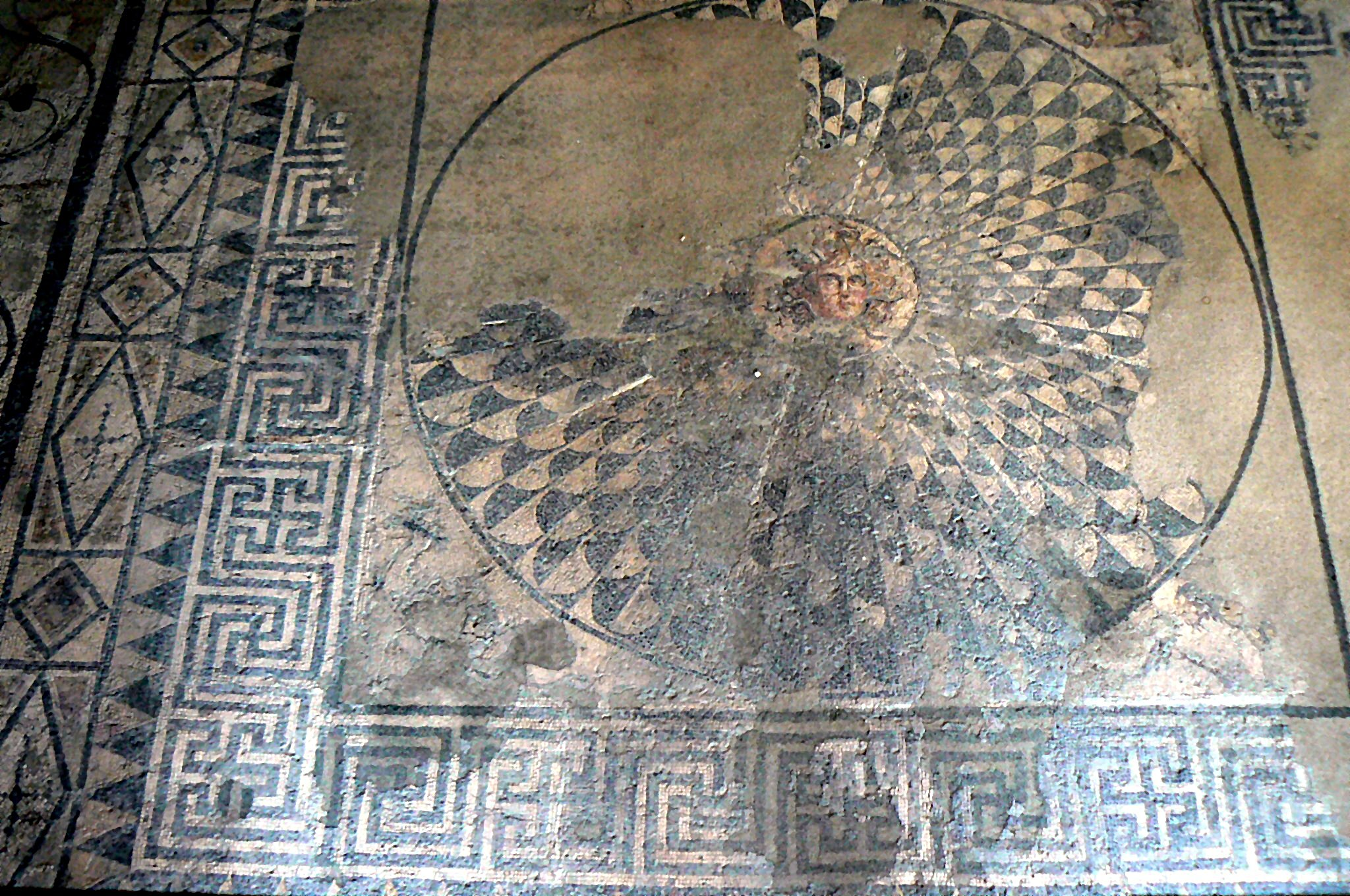
Mosaic of the gorgon Medusa

Three of the mosaics are exhibited in situ and the remaining have been moved from their original locations in order to be conserved and restored. As a whole, the mosaics were laid out using the opus tessellatum (tiles aligned in horizontal or vertical lines) and opus vermiculatum (tiles aligned so as to draw an outline around the shapes) techniques. The tiles were made of marble, clay, limestone and coloured glass and include 16 colour varieties.

Despite the rise of Christianity during the reign of Constantine, the mosaics in the House of Antiope are exclusively pagan in character. They feature depictions of characters from Greek and Roman mythology such as Zeus, Antiope, Ganymede and the gorgon Medusa, as well as floral and geometric motifs and images of exotic animals.

The best-known of the mosaics in the museum is the depiction of the gorgon Medusa, which covers the floor of the tablinum, or office of the house's owner, which is 8 m × 8 m (26 ft × 26 ft) in size. The image of Medusa is surrounded by a round geometric shield, the shield of Athena. Despite the gorgon's reputation as a horrible monster and the presence of snakes instead of hair, the image in the Museum of Mosaics is rather tame and not particularly frightening. Instead, the role of the mosaic was that of a talisman to protect the home from the forces of evil. Medusa is depicted with her face turned slightly to the right, though with her eyes staring left. Tiles of various shades have been employed in order to lend volume to the image.

The mosaic of Zeus and Antiope lies on the floor of the cubiculum, or bedchamber of the villa, which measures 5.60 m × 4.40 m (18.4 ft × 14.4 ft). Angelov claims that the image in the House of Antiope is among the few contemporaneous depictions of that episode. As in mythology, Zeus is portrayed as a young satyr who kidnaps Antiope, attracted by her beauty. The mosaic is accompanied by two inscriptions in Ancient Greek, which explicitly label the characters as ΣΑΤΥΡΟΣ ("satyr") and ΑΝΤΙΟΠΗ ("Antiope").

Other mosaics in the villa include the story of Ganymede, who is transported to Mount Olympus by Zeus transformed into an eagle, which covers the oecus, the largest premise; the badly damaged Seasons mosaic in the women's apartments, which features images of animals, geometric motifs and personifications of the four seasons, of which Autumn has been preserved; and the geometric Pannonian Volutes mosaic, moved to the museum from another ruined ancient building of Marcianopolis.
