= Arnegisclus =

Arnegisclus was a magister militum of the Eastern Roman Empire in 447 AD. Possibly of Gothic descent, Arnegisclus is mentioned in 441 as an officer in Thrace, where he murdered the magister militum Johannes (father of Iordanes), with whom he had feuded in the imperial palace. In 443 Arnegisclus was a comes in Thrace battling the Hunnic ruler Attila. In 447, Arnegisclus was appointed magister militum of Thrace. In the same year, he led from Marcianopolis an attack against Attila but was defeated at the Battle of the Utus and killed. Arnegisclus was the father of Anagast, who was a magister militum in Thrace in 468/469 AD.

== Sources ==
- Arnold Hugh Martin Jones, John Robert Martindale, John Morris: The Prosopography of the Later Roman Empire. Volume II: A.D. 395–527. Cambridge 1980, ISBN 978-0-521-20159-9, S. 151.
- Kulikowski, Michael (2019). Imperial Tragedy: From Constantine's Empire to the Destruction of Roman Italy AD 363-568 (The Profile History of the Ancient World Series). New York: Profile Books. ISBN 978-0-000-07873-5.
