= Battle of the Utus =

Conflict between the Huns and Eastern Roman Empire in 447

Coordinates: 43.61°N 24.68°E

- Part of Hunnic invasion of Balkans
Date	447 AD
Location	near the river Utus (today Vit, Bulgaria)
Result	Hunnic victory

Belligerents
Hunnic Empire	Eastern Roman Empire

Commanders and leaders
Attila the Hun	Arnegisclus †

Strength
30,000	3 field armies (totalling on paper about 71,232 men) and local forces they could meet en-route.

Casualties and losses
Heavy	Entire army killed

The Battle of the Utus was fought in 447 between the army of the Eastern Roman Empire, and the Huns led by Attila at Utus, a river that is today the Vit in Bulgaria. It was the last of the bloody pitched battles between the Eastern Roman Empire and the Huns, as the former attempted to stave off the Hunnic invasion.

The details about Attila's campaign which culminated in the battle of Utus, as well as the events afterwards, are obscure. Only a few short passages from Byzantine sources (Jordanes' Romana, the chronicle of Marcellinus Comes, and the Paschal Chronicle) are available. As with the whole activity of Attila's Huns in the Balkans, the fragmentary evidence does not permit an undisputed reconstruction of the events.

== Background ==
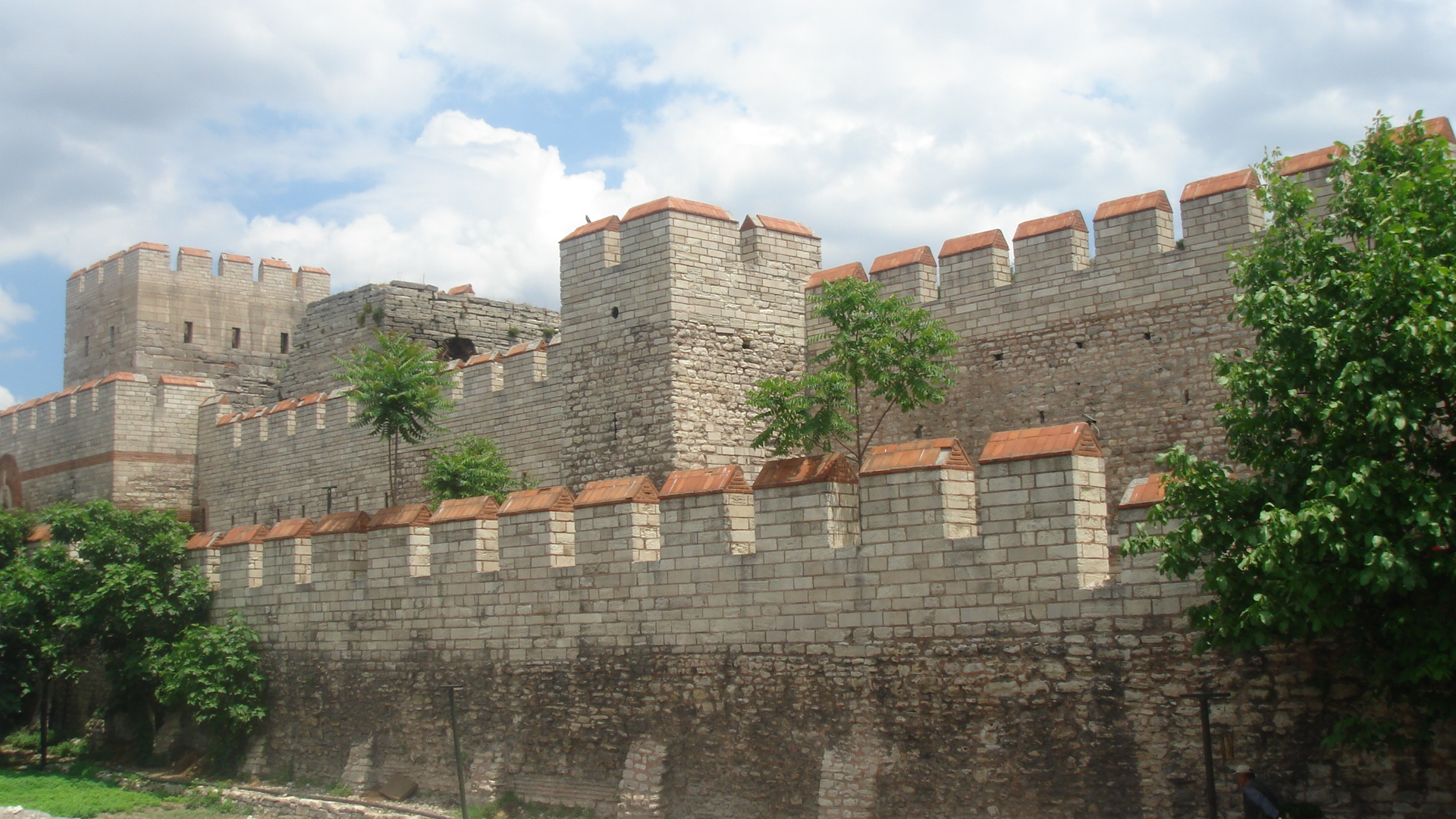
Restored section of the Theodosian Walls at the Selymbria Gate. The Outer Wall and the wall of the moat are visible, with a tower of the Inner Wall in the background.

Beginning in 443, when the Eastern Empire stopped its tribute to the Huns, Attila's army had invaded and ravaged the Balkan regions of the Eastern Empire. After the Danubian defenses were breached and the Huns had overrun Pannonia Secunda and devastated Moesia, Theodosius II recognized the need for a more proactive stance against the Huns in anticipation of future conflicts. In 443, both the Eastern and Western Roman Empires enacted a law imposing harsher penalties on limitanei who farmed land near their garrisons. At the same time, Theodosius II undertook a comprehensive overhaul of the Danubian defensive system, rebuilding patrol fleets and likely upgrading the limitanei forces across the empire, particularly in the East. Attila was preparing for another campaign in 446, and probably launched it in response to news of the collapse of a fifty-seven-tower long stretch of the Theodosian land walls in January 447, after the earthquake happened in Constantinople.

== Battle ==
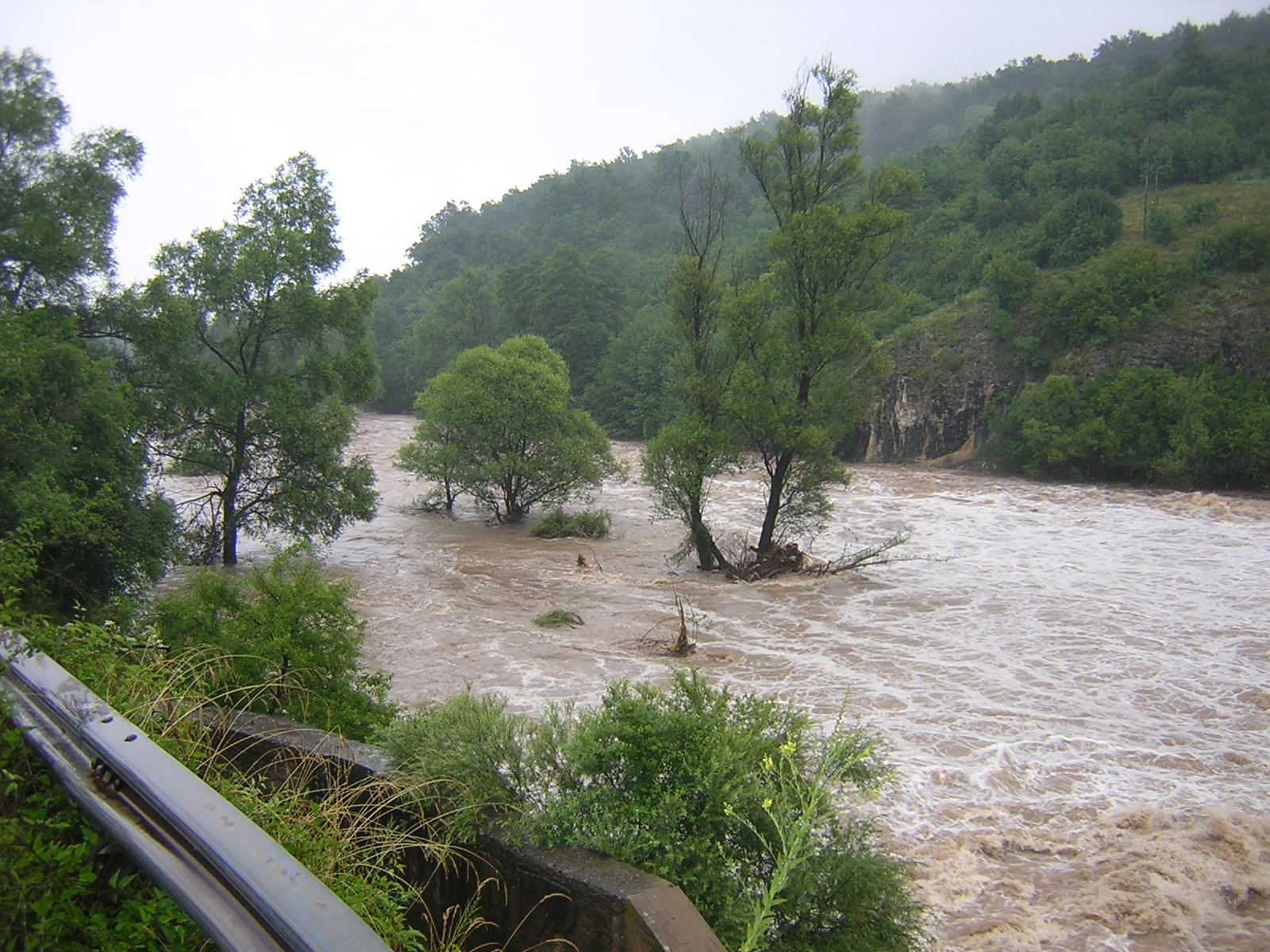
The River Vit near Toros, Bulgaria, during the floods of May 2005.

Theodosius II ordered Arnegisclus, Aspar and Areobindus to march out and meet Attila on the River Vit, in modern Bulgaria. Theodosius, with no other options, had reasoned it necessary to conduct a set-piece battle, which was a typical of the usual strategy. Under these three commanders were the combined forces of the Praesental Army (the Emperor's personal army), Thracian and Illyrian field armies, totalling on paper about 71,232 men, and likely whatever local forces they could meet en-route. The Romans were, according to most modern historians, defeated. This battle would be the event that inaugurated Attila’s infamous legacy. The combined Roman field armies were annihilated, with Arnegisclus killed in battle. (Arnegisclus' horse was killed and he fought on foot until he was cut down.) The defeat was so catastrophic that in 478, after thirty years of recovery, the Thracian army still numbered less than half its former strength.

== Aftermath ==
Marcianople fell immediately to the Huns, who destroyed it; the city then lay desolate until emperor Justinian restored it one hundred years later. Even worse, Constantinople, the capital of the eastern half of the Roman Empire, was especially vulnerable to attack by the Huns as its walls had been ruined during an earthquake in January 447, and its population had suffered from an ensuing plague. However, the Praetorian prefect of the East Constantinus managed to repair the walls in just two months by mobilizing the city's manpower, with the help of the Circus factions. These hasty repairs, combined with the urgent transfer of a body of Isaurian soldiers into the city, plus the heavy losses incurred by the Huns' army in the Battle of Utus, forced Attila to abandon any thought of besieging the capital.

Instead, Attila marched south and laid waste the now-defenseless Balkan provinces (including Illyricum, Thrace, Moesia, Scythia, and both provinces of Roman Dacia) until he was turned back at Thermopylae. The Huns also defeated a second Roman army in the Chersonesus. Callinicus of Rufinianae wrote in his Life of Saint Hypatius, who was still living in Thrace at the time, that "more than a hundred cities were captured, Constantinople almost came into danger and most men fled from it", although this was probably exaggerated. Peace was only restored when a treaty was signed in the fall of 447 or a year later in 448. By this treaty, the Eastern Emperor Theodosius II agreed to pay Attila a tribute of 6,000 lbs of gold up front and 2,100 lbs annually. Additionally, a no man's land in the Roman territory was created; this extended 300 miles from Singidunum to Novae, with a depth of 100 miles or five days' journey south of the Danube and functioned as a buffer zone.

== Sources ==
- Blockley, R.C. (1981). Fragmentary Classicising Historians of the Later Roman Empire, Volume 1: Eunapius, Olympiodorus, Priscus and Malchus (Arca). Francis Cairns. ISBN 0-905205-07-3.
- Heather, Peter (2010) [2005]. The Fall of the Roman Empire: A New History. London: Pan Macmillan. ISBN 9780330529839.
- Kim, Hyun Jin (2015). The Huns. Oxford: Routledge. ISBN 9781317340911.
- Martindale, J. R. (ed.). The Prosopography of the Later Roman Empire, Cambridge University Press, 1980, vol.2, ISBN 0-521-20159-4
- Thompson, E. A.; Heather, Peter. The Huns, Blackwell, 1999. ISBN 0-631-21443-7
- Williams, Stephen; Friell, Gerard (1999). The Rome that Did Not Fall: The Survival of the East in the Fifth Century. Oxford: Routledge. ISBN 978-0-415-15403-1.
- Taylor, Donathan (2016). Roman Empire at War: A Compendium of Roman Battles from 31 B.C. to A.D. 565. Pen and Sword.
