= Treaty of Margus =

435 treaty between the Huns and the Roman Empire

The Treaty of Margus was a treaty between the Huns and the Roman Empire, signed in Margus, Moesia Superior (modern-day Požarevac, Serbia). It was signed by Roman consul Flavius Plintha in 435. Among other stipulations, the treaty doubled the annual tributes the Romans agreed to pay in a previous treaty from 350 pounds of gold to 700 pounds of gold per annum. It also stipulated that the Romans would not enter into any alliances with enemies of the Huns and that they would return any Hunnic refugees in their borders.

When the Romans breached the treaty in 440, Bleda and Attila attacked Castra Constantia (Szentendre, Hungary), a Roman fortress and marketplace on the banks of the Danube.
