= Sack of Aquileia =

Destruction of the Roman city by the Huns (452)

- Part of the Hunnic invasion of Italy
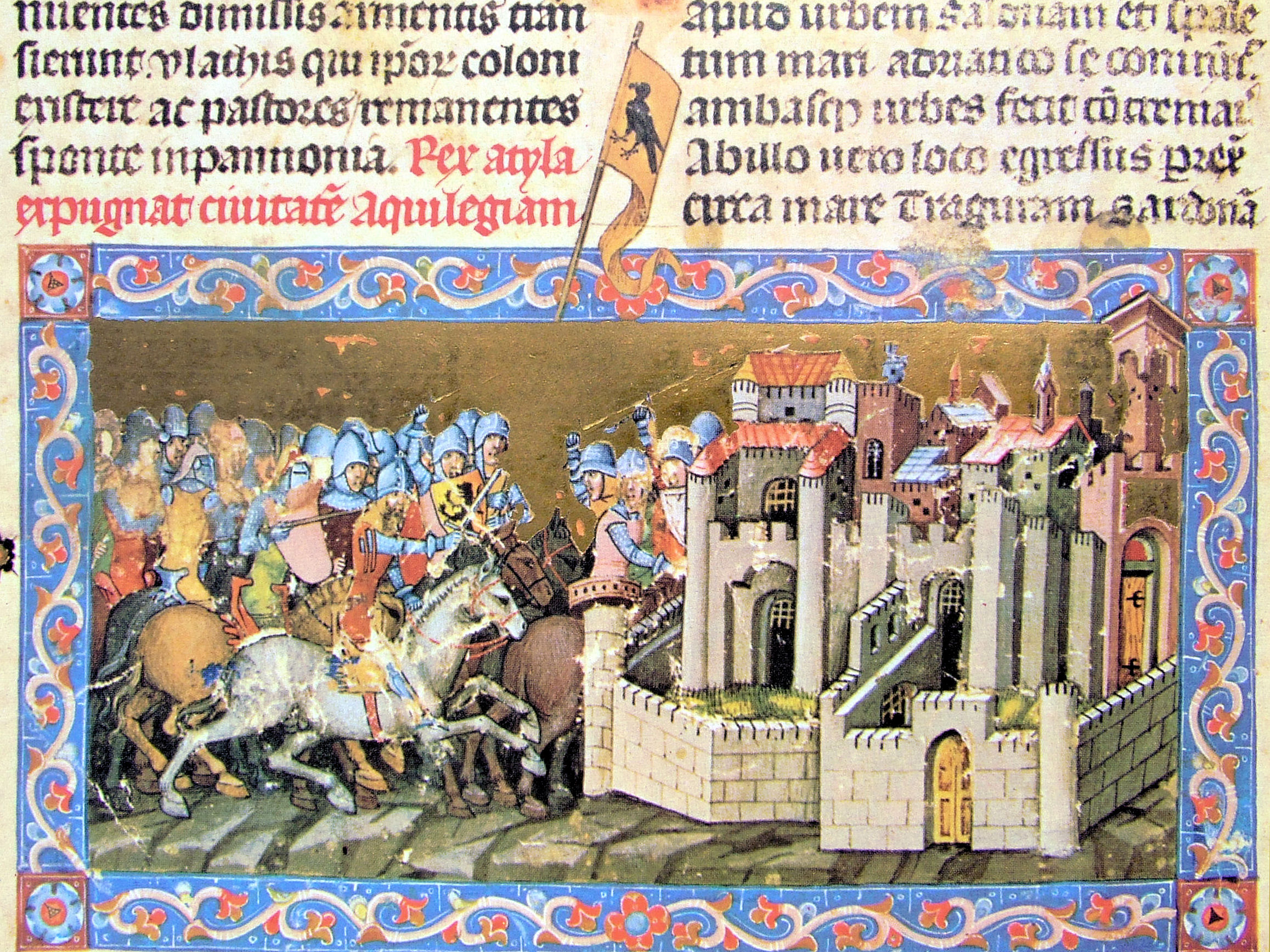
- Attila besieging Aquileia (Chronicon Pictum, 1358)
Date	18 July 452
Location	Aquileia, Western Roman Empire (now within Friuli-Venezia Giulia, Italy)
Result	Hunnic victory; Destruction of Aquileia

Belligerents
Hunnic Empire	Western Roman Empire

Commanders and leaders
Attila the Hun	Unknown

The Sack of Aquileia occurred in 452, and was carried out by the Huns under the leadership of Attila.

== Campaign ==
A year after the Battle of Catalaunian Fields, Attila launched an invasion of Italy, passing through Pannonia into Venetia, where he laid siege to Aquileia. Jordanes states that the city was well defended, to the point where Attila considered withdrawing. Indeed, Ian Hughes suggests that since Aetius was unable to blockade the Julian Alps, he instead reinforced the city garrison to force Attila into a siege, or otherwise risk Roman forces cutting off his potential retreat. The siege lasted for some time, and Jordanes states that as Attila was considering withdrawing, the city fell in a renewed assault and he razed it to the ground.

Before its destruction, Aquileia was a center of government (with an imperial residence), commerce and finance (with a mint), military defense, and Christianity (with a bishop). Its destruction and Attila's subsequent unimpeded ravaging of the province of Venetia (modern Veneto and Friuli) paved the way for the rise of Venice, which within a few centuries replaced and even surpassed it in importance.

== Aftermath ==
Attila then proceeded to raid Italy, with Aetius able to do little more than harass Attila at best. It was only when an embassy including Pope Leo I arrived that Attila finally ended his invasion, likely out of respect for the Pope or as a result of famine, disease, and an Eastern Roman Army approaching the Hunnic settlements near the Tisza.
