= Margum (city) =

Coordinates: 44°37′00″N 21°11′00″E

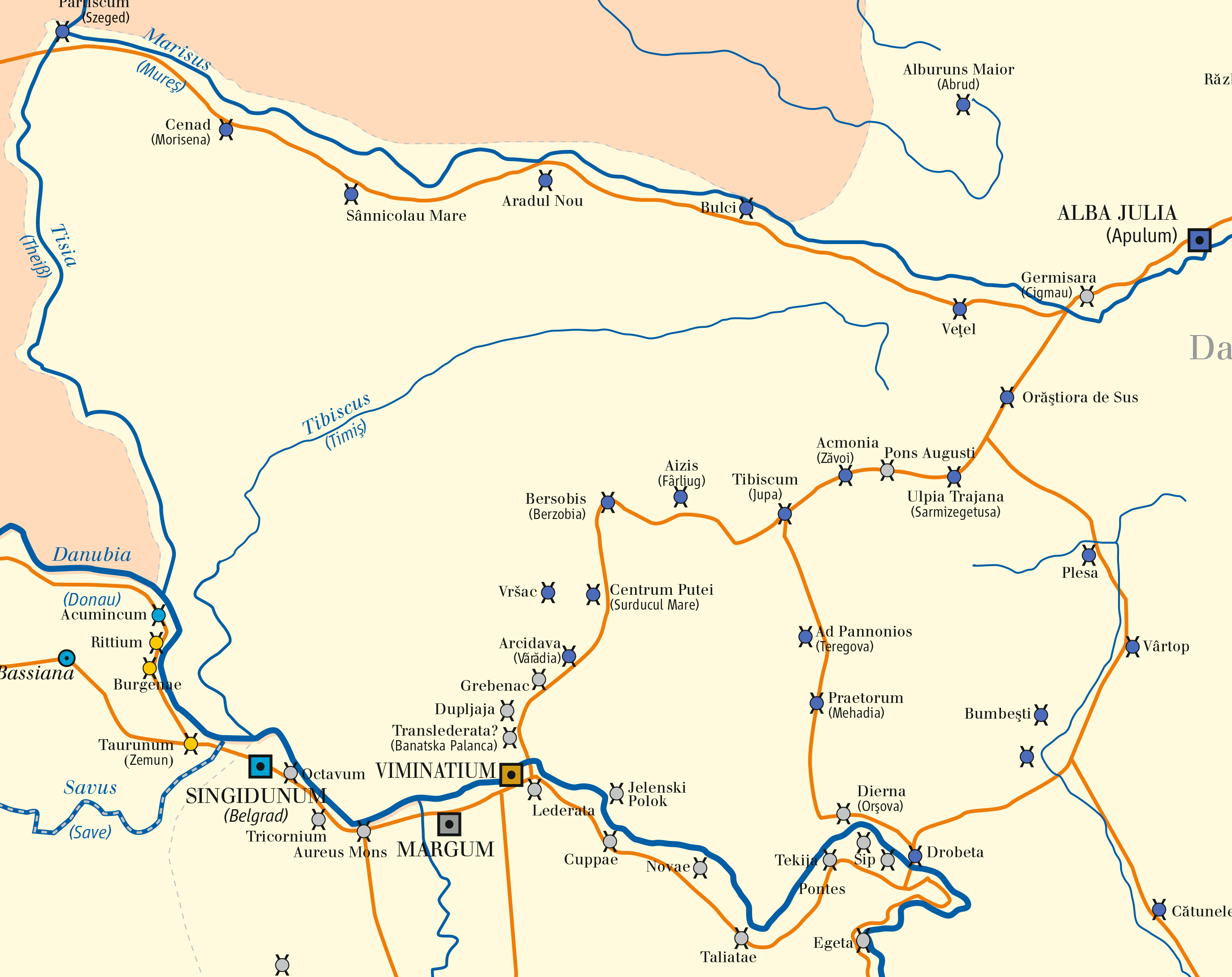
Roman Margum on the Moesian Limes

Margum (Latin: Margum, Greek: Μάργος [Márgos]) was an ancient Roman and early medieval Byzantine fortified city, now an archeological site situated in Dubravica, near the present-day Požarevac (Serbia). Located near the confluence of Great Morava and Danube, ancient Margum got its name from the Latin name of river Margus (Great Morava), while the later medieval city, renewed on the same site in the 9th century, got its name Morava (Greek: Μοράβος) or Moravski (Greek: Μορόβισκον) from the Slavic name for the same river. Before the Roman conquest in the first century BC, the area was inhabited by Triballi, Scordisci and other tribes. Roman Margum initially belonged to Moesia Superior, and later to Moesia Prima. It became an important stronghold on the Moesian Limes, and was located near Viminacium, the provincial capital.

In 435, the city of Margus, under the Eastern Roman Empire, was the site of a treaty between the Byzantine Empire and the Hun leaders Attila and Bleda. One pretext for the Hun invasion of the Eastern Roman Empire in 442 was that the Bishop of Margus had crossed the Danube to ransack and desecrate the royal Hun graves on the north bank of the Danube. When the Romans discussed handing over the Bishop, he slipped away and betrayed the city to the Huns, who then sacked the city and went on to invade as far as the gates of Constantinople itself.

Byzantine rule in Moesia Prima collapsed by the beginning of the 7th century, under the pressure of Avars and Slavs, while local cities and fortresses, including Margum, were captured and largely destroyed. The region was inhabited by South Slavs, and by the 9th century a fortified settlement was renewed on the site of former Margum, becoming known as the city or fortress of Morava. It came under the Bulgarian rule, and was later recaptured by the Byzantines. The city of Morava was an episcopal seat already in 879/880, and upon later transfer of episcopal residence to nearby Braničevo in the 11th century, local bishops continued to be titled as "of Morava and Braničevo".

== See also ==
- Battle of the Margus

== Sources ==
- Ivanišević, Vujadin; Krsmanović, Bojana (2018). "New Byzantine Seals from Morava (Margum) and Braničevo" (PDF). Старинар. 68: 111–124.
- Komatina, Predrag (2010). "The Slavs of the mid-Danube basin and the Bulgarian expansion in the first half of the 9th century" (PDF). Зборник радова Византолошког института. 47: 55–82. Archived from the original on 2026-02-27.
- Komatina, Predrag (2015). "The Church in Serbia at the Time of Cyrilo-Methodian Mission in Moravia" (PDF). Cyril and Methodius: Byzantium and the World of the Slavs. Thessaloniki: Dimos. pp. 711–718. Archived from the original on 2024-09-08.
- Komatina, Predrag (2016). "Military, Administrative and Religious Strongholds on the Danubian Frontier: The Example of Morava and Braničevo" (PDF). Processes of Byzantinisation and Serbian Archaeology. Belgrade: Institute for Byzantine Studie. pp. 103–107. Archived from the original on 2024-09-11.
- Mirković, Miroslava (1976). Inscriptions de la Mésie Supérieure. Vol. 1. Belgrade: Centre d'études épigraphiques et numismatiques.
- Mirković, Miroslava (2007). Moesia Superior: Eine Provinz an der mittleren Donau. Mainz am Rhein: Zabern.
