= Siege of Milan (452) =

Destruction of the Roman city by the Huns (452 CE)

Siege and capture of Milan
- Part of the Hunnic invasion of Italy
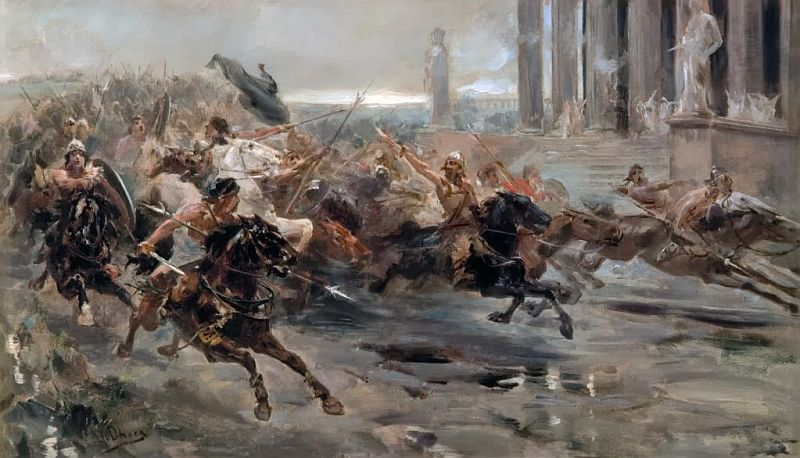
- The invasion of the Huns in Italy portrayed in an 1887 painting by Ulpiano Checa
Date	452 AD
Location	Milan, Western Roman Empire
Result	Hunnic victory; Destruction of Milan

Belligerents
Hunnic Empire	Western Roman Empire

Commanders and leaders
Attila the Hun	Unknown

Strength
Unknown	Unknown

Casualties and losses
Unknown	3,000 killed or more

The siege and capture of Milan was one of the episodes of the Hun wars fought in Italy. It was carried out by Attila and his Huns in 452, it resulted in the victory of the barbarians and the destruction of Milan. Milan, then called Mediolanum, had been the capital of the Western Roman Empire until 402 AD.

== Background ==
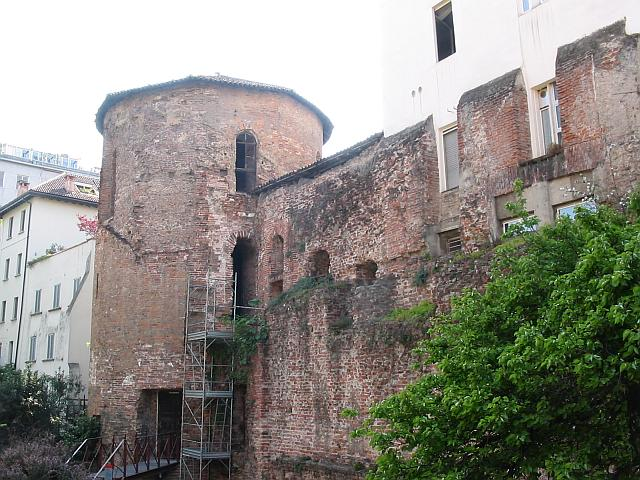
Surviving section of the Roman walls of Mediolanum

Attila invaded Italy in 452 to renew his marriage claim to Honoria. Attila launched an invasion of Italy, passing through Pannonia into Venetia, where he laid siege to Aquileia, a fortified city of great strategic importance: its possession made it possible to control a large part of northern Italy.

Attila besieged it for three months but in vain. Legend has it that just as he was about to retire, a white stork took off from a tower on the walls and left the city with its baby on its back. The superstitious Attila at that sight ordered his army to stay: shortly after the part of the walls where the tower left by the stork was located collapsed. Attila was thus able to take possession of the city, which he razed to the ground without leaving any trace of its existence.

He then proceeded towards Padua, which he sacked completely. Before his arrival, many of the city's inhabitants sought refuge in the lagoon, where they would later found Venice. After the capture of Aquileia, Attila's advance to Milan took place without difficulty as no city attempted resistance but all opened their doors to the invader out of fear.

== Siege ==
No chronicles have come down to us that have described the events in detail, but from indirect testimonies, such as the subsequent letter from Massimo II, bishop of Turin, to the Milanese, it is clear that the battle was bloody and the city was almost completely destroyed.

The singular way in which Attila asserted his superiority over Rome has remained famous: in the imperial palace in Milan there was a painting in which the Caesars were depicted seated on thrones and the Scythian princes at their feet; Attila, struck by the painting, had it modified: the Caesars were depicted in the act of emptying suppliant bags of gold in front of Attila's throne.

Flavius Aetius, the Magister militum of the Western Roman Empire had been unable to meet Atilla in battle. Instead he harassed Attila's force, managing to slow the Hunnic advance.
