= Marcianopolis =

Ancient Roman city in Thracia

- Μαρκιανούπολις (Ancient Greek)
- Location within Bulgaria
- 43.225°N 27.585°E
- Location: Bulgaria
- Region: Varna Province

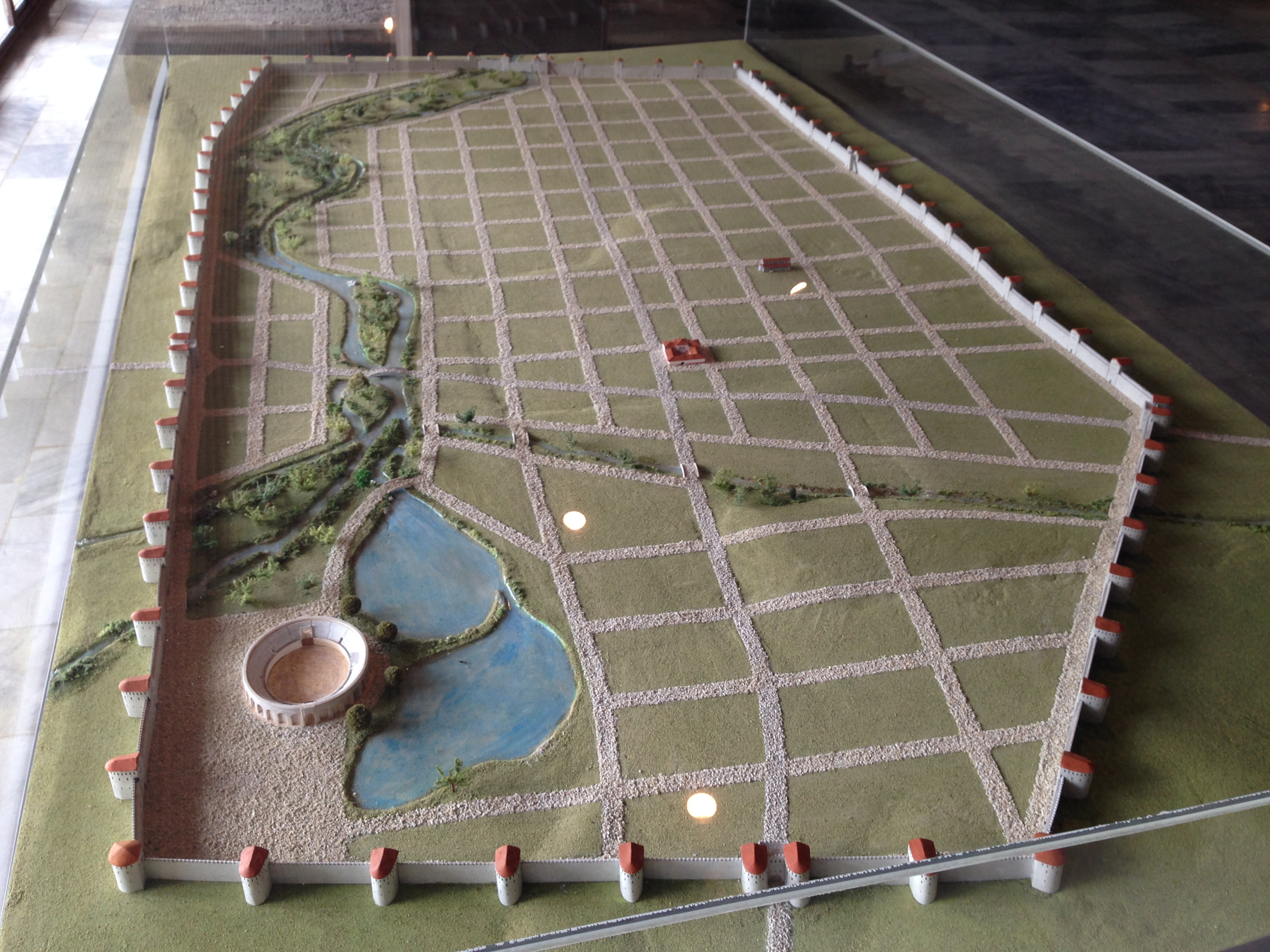
Marcianopolis city model (Devnya museum) and showing the location of the House of Antiope in the centre

Marcianopolis or Marcianople (Greek: Μαρκιανούπολις), also known as Parthenopolis, was an ancient Greek, then Roman capital city and archbishopric in Moesia Inferior. It is located at the site of modern-day Devnya, Bulgaria. The ancient city has been partially excavated and is renowned for its museum collection of ancient mosaic floors from villas in the city.

== History ==
Gothic Invasions 250-251

Roman Emperor Trajan renamed the ancient city of Parthenopolis after the Second Dacian War, which ended in 106. The city was renamed after Trajan's sister, Ulpia Marciana. An important strategic centre, the city was part of Roman Thrace until 187–193, and then belonged to Moesia inferior.

Marcianopolis's prosperity under the Severan Dynasty was ended by a Gothic raid in 248–249 and subsequent barbarian invasions from the north. The Romans repulsed another Gothic attack to this town in 267 (or 268), during the reign of Gallienus.

Under Emperor Diocletian Marcianopolis became the centre of the province Moesia Secunda of the Diocese of Thrace, and was rebuilt thoroughly in the late 3rd and early 4th century. It grew in importance at the expense of neighbouring Odessos (Varna) in the 4th century. The city was an important episcopal centre and a basilica from the period was excavated in the 20th century. During Emperor Valens' conflict with the Goths (366–369), Marcianopolis was a temporary capital of the empire and the largest city of Thrace according to a source from the period.

In 447, it was destroyed by the Huns under Attila, immediately after the bloody battle of the Utus river.

Emperor Justinian I restored and fortified it. In 587, it was sacked by the Avars but at once retaken by the Byzantines. The Byzantine army was quartered there in 596 before crossing the Danube to assault the Avars. Despite the regular barbarian attacks, Marcianopolis remained an important centre until an Avar raid finally destroyed it in 614–615, although it still continued to be mentioned on maps until much later.

As the Slavs settled in the Balkans in the 7th century, they called the ruins of the ancient city Devina.

== Sights ==
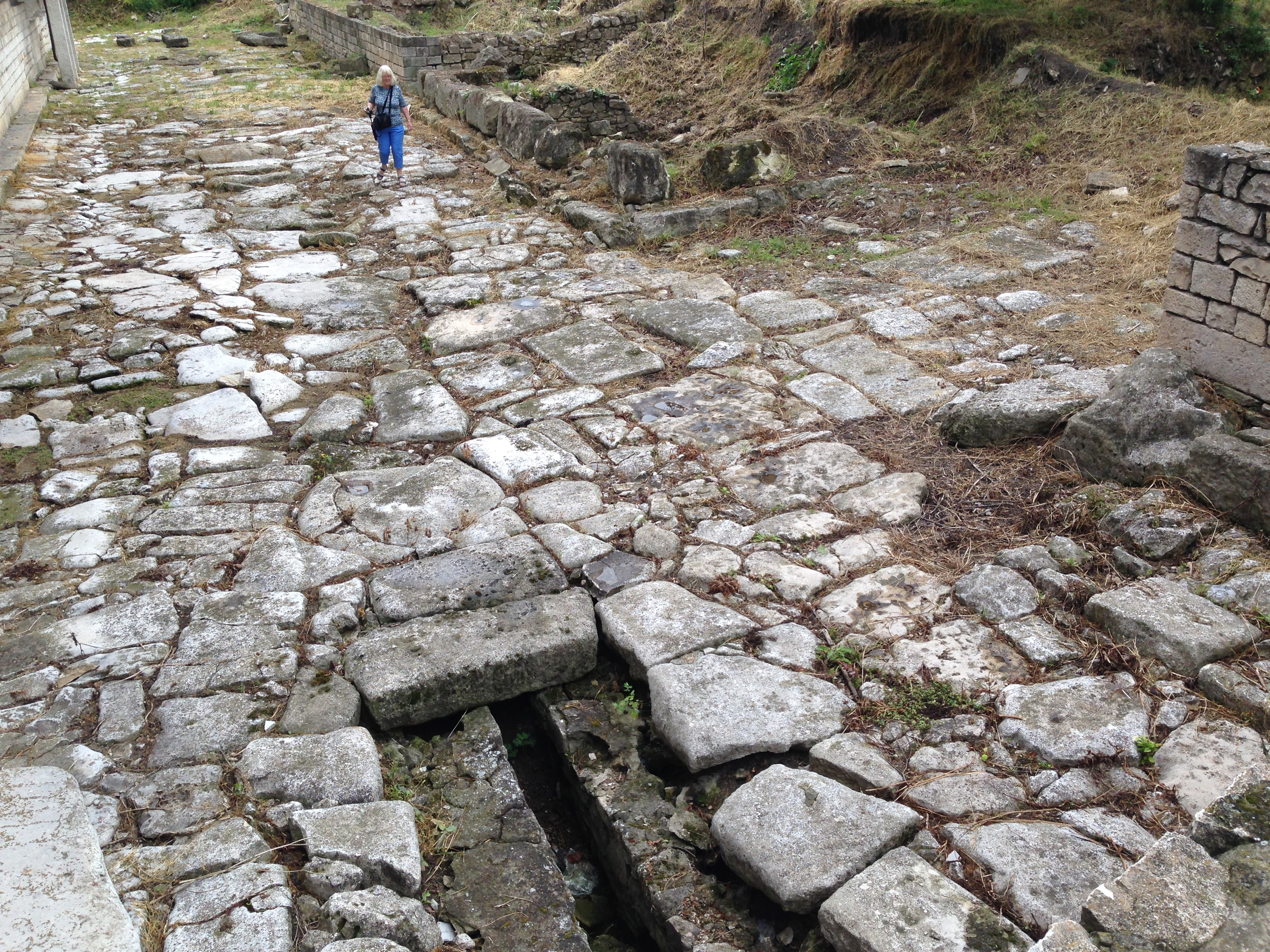
Main street of the city

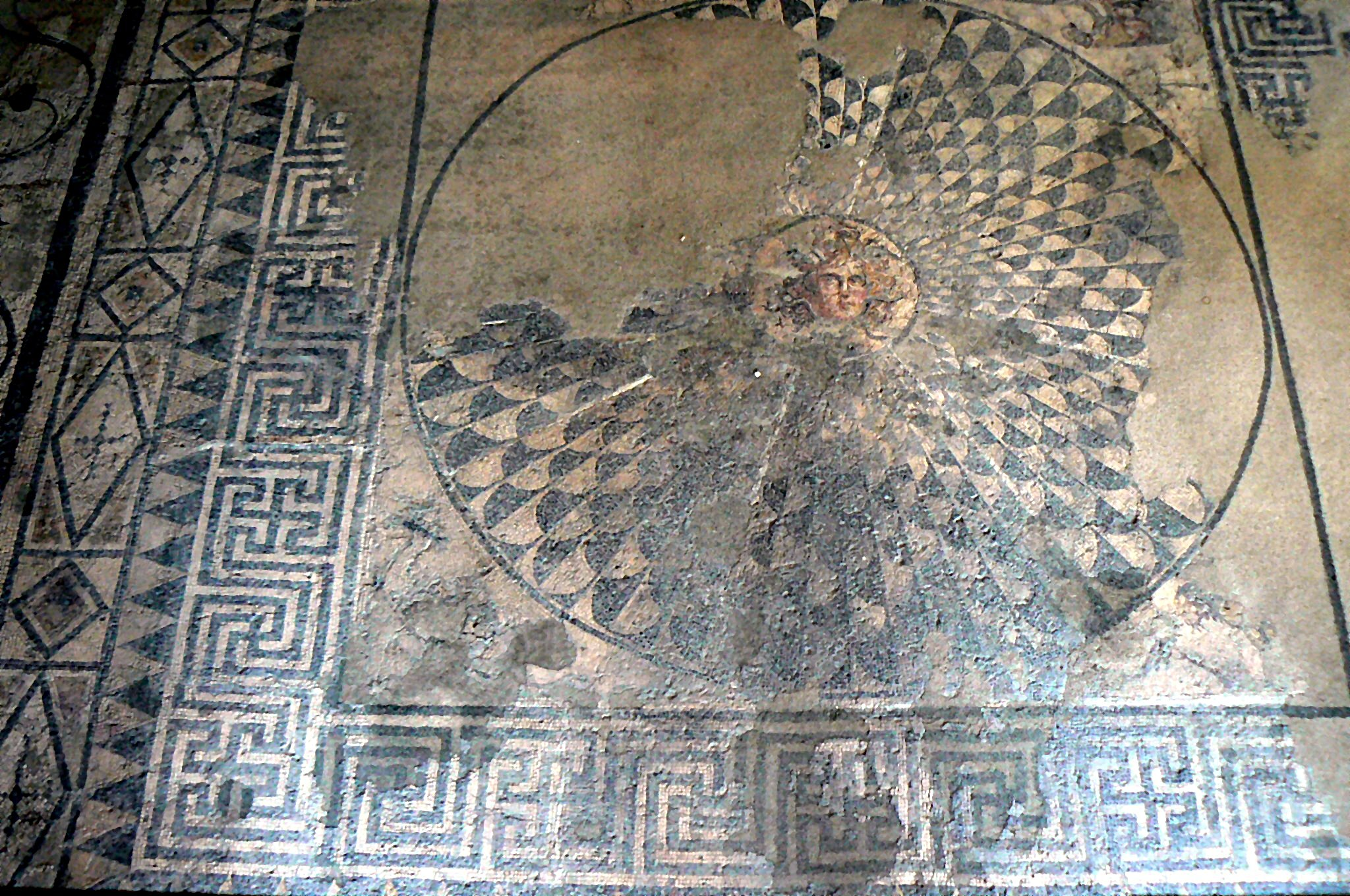
A mosaic featuring an image of the gorgon Medusa in Devnya's Museum of Mosaics

Remains of the Roman city include the amphitheatre, some streets and many exquisite mosaics of the House of Antiope, a Roman villa of the late 3rd or early 4th century AD which are exhibited in the Museum of Mosaics, some in situ.
