= Huns =

Extinct nomadic people in Eurasia (4th–6th centuries)

- 370s–469
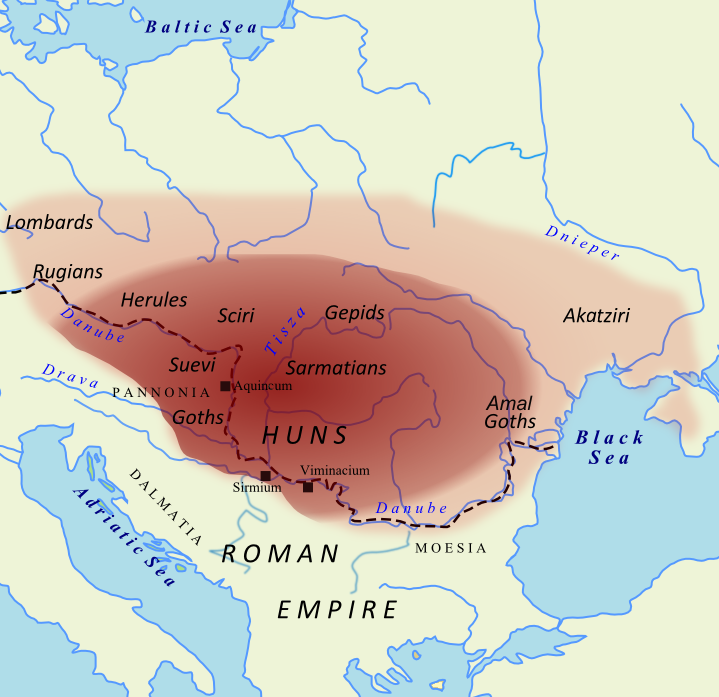
- Estimated territory under Hunnic political control under Attila, c. 450 CE
- Capital: Attila's Court (434–453)
- Common languages: Hunnic; Gothic; Various tribal languages
- Government: Tribal; Confederation
- King or chief
  - 370s?: Balamber?
  - c. 395 – ?: Kursich and Basich
  - c. 400–409: Uldin
  - c. 412 – ?: Charaton
  - c. 420s–430: Octar and Rugila
  - 430–435: Rugila
  - 435–445: Attila and Bleda
  - 445–453: Attila
  - 453–469: Dengizich and Ernak
  - 469–?: Ernak
- Historical era: Ancient history; Migration Period
  - Huns appear north-west of the Caspian Sea: pre 370s
  - Conquest of the Alans and Goths: 370s
  - Attila and Bleda become co-rulers of the united tribes: 437
  - Death of Bleda, Attila becomes sole ruler: 445
  - Battle of the Catalaunian Plains: 451
  - Invasion of northern Italy: 452
  - Battle of Nedao: 454
  - Dengizich, son of Attila, dies: 469

Area
- 441: 4,000,000 km^{2} (1,500,000 sq mi)
Preceded by
Alans
Greuthungi
Thervingi
Pannonia
Succeeded by
Gepids
Rugiland
Ostrogothic Kingdom
Kingdom of the Suebi (Danube)

The Huns were a nomadic people who lived in Central Asia, the Caucasus, and Eastern Europe between the 4th and 6th centuries CE. They were first reported living east of the Volga River, in an area that was part of Scythia at the time. By 370 CE, the Huns had arrived on the Volga, causing the westward movement of Goths and Alans. By 430, they had established a vast, but short-lived, empire on the Danubian frontier of the Roman empire in Europe. Several central and eastern European peoples seem to have maintained kingdoms under Hunnic hegemony, including not only the recently arrived Amali-led Goths, but also Gepids, Sarmatians, Heruli, Suebi, Sciri, and Rugii, who were all already associated with the Carpathian-Danubian region before the Huns arrived.

The Huns, especially under their King Attila, made frequent and devastating raids into the Eastern Roman Empire. In 451, they invaded the Western Roman province of Gaul, where they fought a combined army of Romans and Visigoths at the Battle of the Catalaunian Fields, and in 452, they invaded Italy. After the death of Attila in 453, the Huns ceased to be a major threat to Rome and lost much of their empire following the Battle of Nedao (c. 454). Descendants of the Huns, or successors with similar names, are recorded by neighboring populations to the south, east, and west as having occupied parts of Eastern Europe and Central Asia from about the 4th to 6th centuries. Variants of the Hun name are recorded in the Caucasus until the early 8th century.

In the 18th century, French scholar Joseph de Guignes became the first to propose a link between the Huns and the Xiongnu people, who lived in Mongolia and northern China from the 3rd century BCE to the late 1st century CE. Since Guignes's time, considerable scholarly effort has been devoted to investigating such a connection. The issue remains controversial, but recent archaeogenetic studies show some Hun-era individuals to have DNA similar to populations in ancient Mongolia. Their relationships with other entities, such as the Iranian Huns and the Huna people who invaded the Indian subcontinent, have also been disputed.

Very little is known about Hunnic culture, and very few archaeological remains have been conclusively associated with the Huns. They are believed to have used bronze cauldrons and to have performed artificial cranial deformation. No description exists of the Hunnic religion at the time of Attila, but practices such as divination are attested, as well as the likely existence of shamans. It is also known that the Huns had a language of their own; however, only three words and personal names attest to it.

Economically, the Huns are known to have practiced a form of nomadic pastoralism. As their contact with the Roman world grew, their economy became increasingly tied with Rome through tribute, raiding, and trade. They do not seem to have had a unified government when they entered Europe but rather to have developed a unified tribal leadership in the course of their wars with the Romans. The Huns ruled over a variety of peoples who spoke numerous languages, and some maintained their own rulers. Their main method of warfare was mounted archery.

The Huns may have initiated the Great Migration, a contributing factor in the collapse of the Western Roman Empire. The memory of the Huns also lived on in the hagiographies of various Christian saints, where the Huns play the role of antagonist, as well as in Germanic heroic legend, where the Huns are variously the antagonists or allies of the main Germanic figures. In Hungary, a legend developed based on medieval chronicles that the Hungarians, and in particular the Székely ethnic group, are descended from the Huns. However, mainstream scholarship has dismissed a close connection between the Hungarians and Huns. Modern culture generally associates the Huns with extreme cruelty and barbarism and is intertwined with the Mongol Empire.

== Origin ==
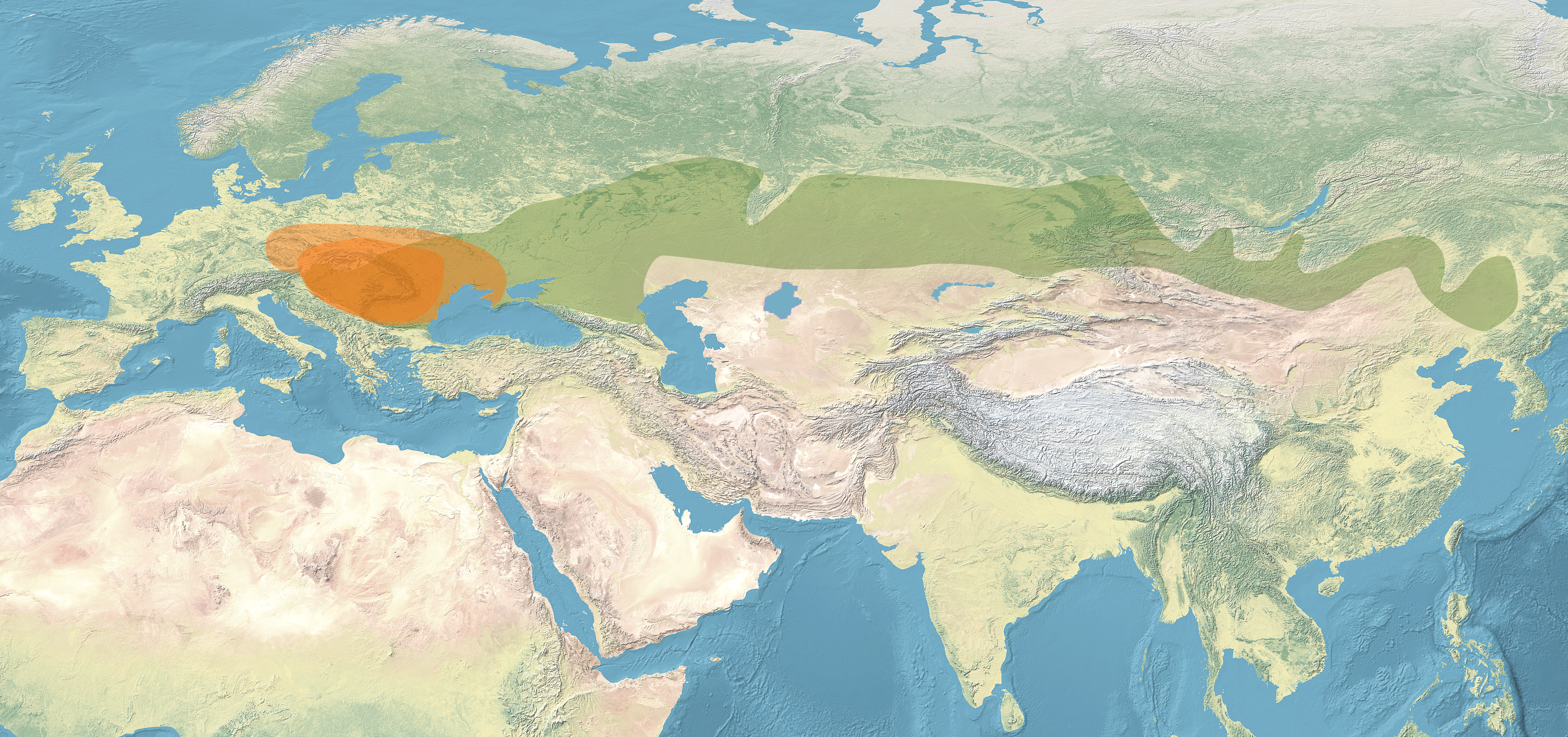
The Eurasian Steppe Belt ( ), and main contemporary continental Asian polities circa 400 CE. Towards the east of the Steppe Belt, the rise of the powerful Rouran Khaganate may have encouraged the migration of the Huns to the west. On the other hand, some historians have noted a high synchronicity between the "reign of terror" of Attila in the west and the southern expansion of the Hephthalites, a vassal state of the Rourans, with extensive territorial overlap between the Huns and the Hephthalites in Central Asia.

The origins of the Huns and their links to other steppe people remain uncertain: they likely originated in Central Asia but their origins are disputed. Classical sources assert that they appeared in Europe suddenly around 370.

=== Roman-era sources ===
Most typically, Roman writers' attempts to elucidate the origins of the Huns simply equated them with earlier steppe peoples. Roman writers repeated a tale that the Huns had entered the domain of the Goths while they were pursuing a wild stag, or else one of their cows that had escaped, across the Kerch Strait into Crimea. Discovering the land fertile, they then attacked the Goths. Jordanes's Getica relates that the Goths held the Huns to be offspring of "unclean spirits" and Gothic witches (Getica 24:121).

=== Relation to the Xiongnu and other peoples called Huns ===
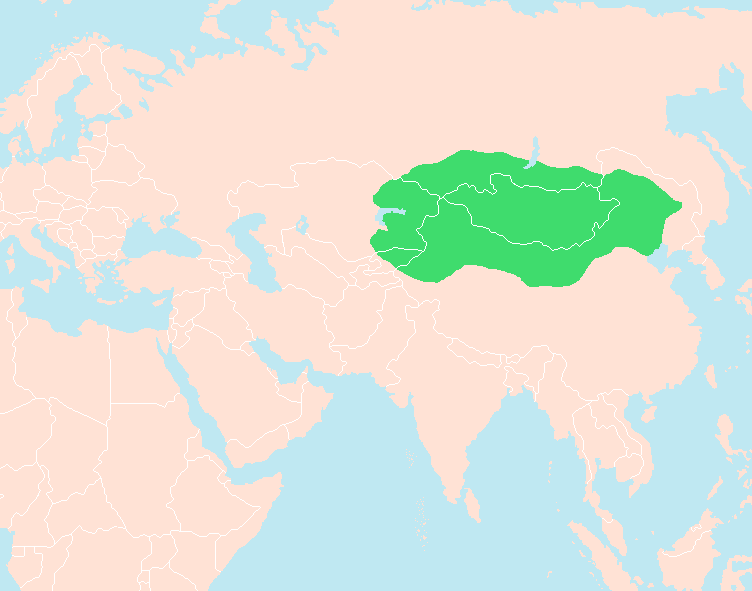
Domain and influence of Xiongnu under Modu Chanyu around 205 BCE: the area hypothesised to have formed the cradle of Hun culture

Since Joseph de Guignes in the 18th century, modern historians have associated the Huns who appeared on the borders of Europe in the 4th century CE with the Xiongnu who had invaded numerous Central Plain polities from the Mongolian Plateau between the 3rd century BCE and the 2nd century CE. After the devastating defeat by the Han dynasty, the northern branch of the Xiongnu retreated north-westward; their descendants may have migrated through the Eurasian Steppe and consequently they may have some degree of cultural and genetic continuity with the Huns. Scholars also discussed the relationship between the Xiongnu, the Huns, and a number of people in central Asia who were also known as or came to be identified with the name "Hun" or "Iranian Huns". The most prominent of these were Chionites, the Kidarites, and the Hephthalites.

Modern depiction of Attila the Hun

Otto J. Maenchen-Helfen was the first to challenge the traditional approach, based primarily on the study of written sources, and to emphasize the importance of archaeological research. Since Maenchen-Helfen's work, the identification of the Xiongnu as the Huns' ancestors has become controversial. Additionally, several scholars have questioned the identification of the "Iranian Huns" with the European Huns. Walter Pohl cautions that

none of the great confederations of steppe warriors was ethnically homogenous, and the same name was used by different groups for reasons of prestige, or by outsiders to describe their lifestyle or geographic origin. [...] It is therefore futile to speculate about identity or blood relationships between H(s)iung-nu, Hephthalites, and Attila's Huns, for instance. All we can safely say is that the name Huns, in late antiquity, described prestigious ruling groups of steppe warriors.

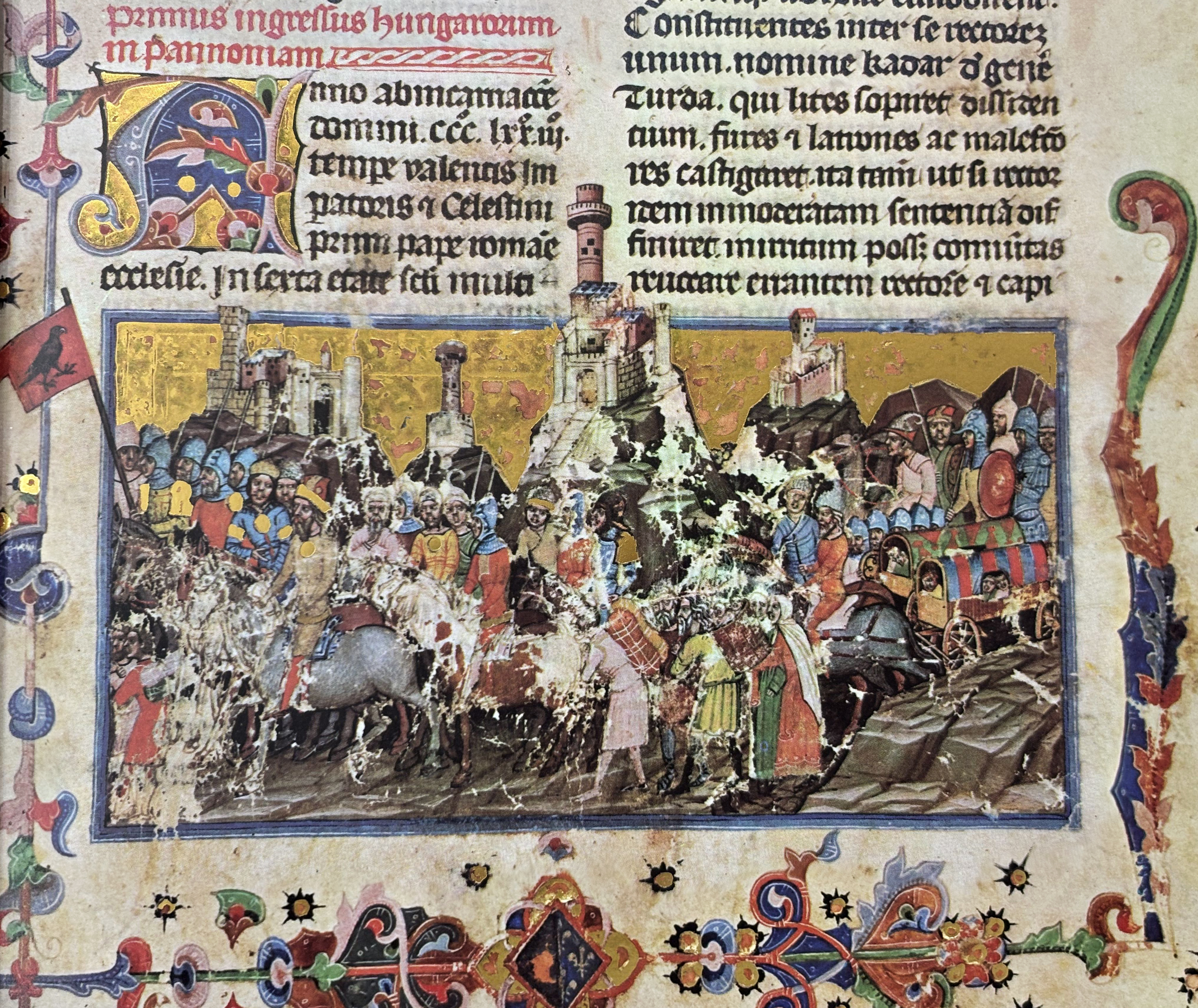
Arrival of the Huns in Pannonia (Chronicon Pictum, 1358)

As of October 2026, there is no general consensus on the issue of a Hun–Xiongnu connection. Recent supporters of a connection between the Huns and Xiongnu include Hyun Jin Kim and Etienne de la Vaissière. De la Vaissière argues that ancient Chinese and Indian sources used Xiongnu and Hun to translate each other, and that the various "Iranian Huns" were similarly identified with the Xiongnu. Kim believes that the term Hun was "not primarily an ethnic group, but a political category" and argues for a fundamental political and cultural continuity between the Xiongnu and the European Huns, as well as between the Xiongnu and the "Iranian Huns".

=== Etymology ===
The name Hun is attested in classical European sources as Greek Οὖννοι (Oûnnoi) and Latin Hunni or Chuni. John Malalas records their name as Οὖννα (Oûnna). Another possible Greek variant may be Χοῦνοι (Khoûnoi), although this group's identification with the Huns is disputed. Classical sources also frequently use the names of older and unrelated steppe nomads instead of the name Hun, calling them Massagetae, Scythians, and Cimmerians, among other names.

The etymology of Hun is unclear. Various proposed etymologies generally assume at least that the names of the various Eurasian groups known as Huns are related. There have been a number of proposed Turkic etymologies, deriving the name variously from Turkic ön, öna (to grow), qun (glutton), kün, gün, a plural suffix "supposedly meaning 'people'", qun (force), and hün (ferocious). Maenchen-Helfen dismisses all of these Turkic etymologies as "mere guesses" and proposes an Iranian etymology, from a word akin to Avestan hūnarā (skill), hūnaravant- (skillful). He suggests that it may originally have designated a rank rather than an ethnicity. Robert Werner has advanced an etymology from Tocharian ku (dog), suggesting—as the Chinese called the Xiongnu dogs—that the dog was the totem animal of the Hunnic tribe. He also compares the name Massagetae, noting that the element saka in that name means dog. Others such as Harold Bailey, S. Parlato, and Jamsheed Choksy have argued that the name derives from an Iranian word akin to Avestan Ẋyaona, and was a generalized term meaning "hostiles, opponents". Christopher Atwood dismisses this possibility on phonological and chronological grounds. While not arriving at an etymology per se, Atwood derives the name from the Ongi River in Mongolia, which was pronounced the same as, or similarly to, the name Xiongnu, and suggests that it was originally a dynastic name rather than an ethnic name.

=== Physical appearance ===
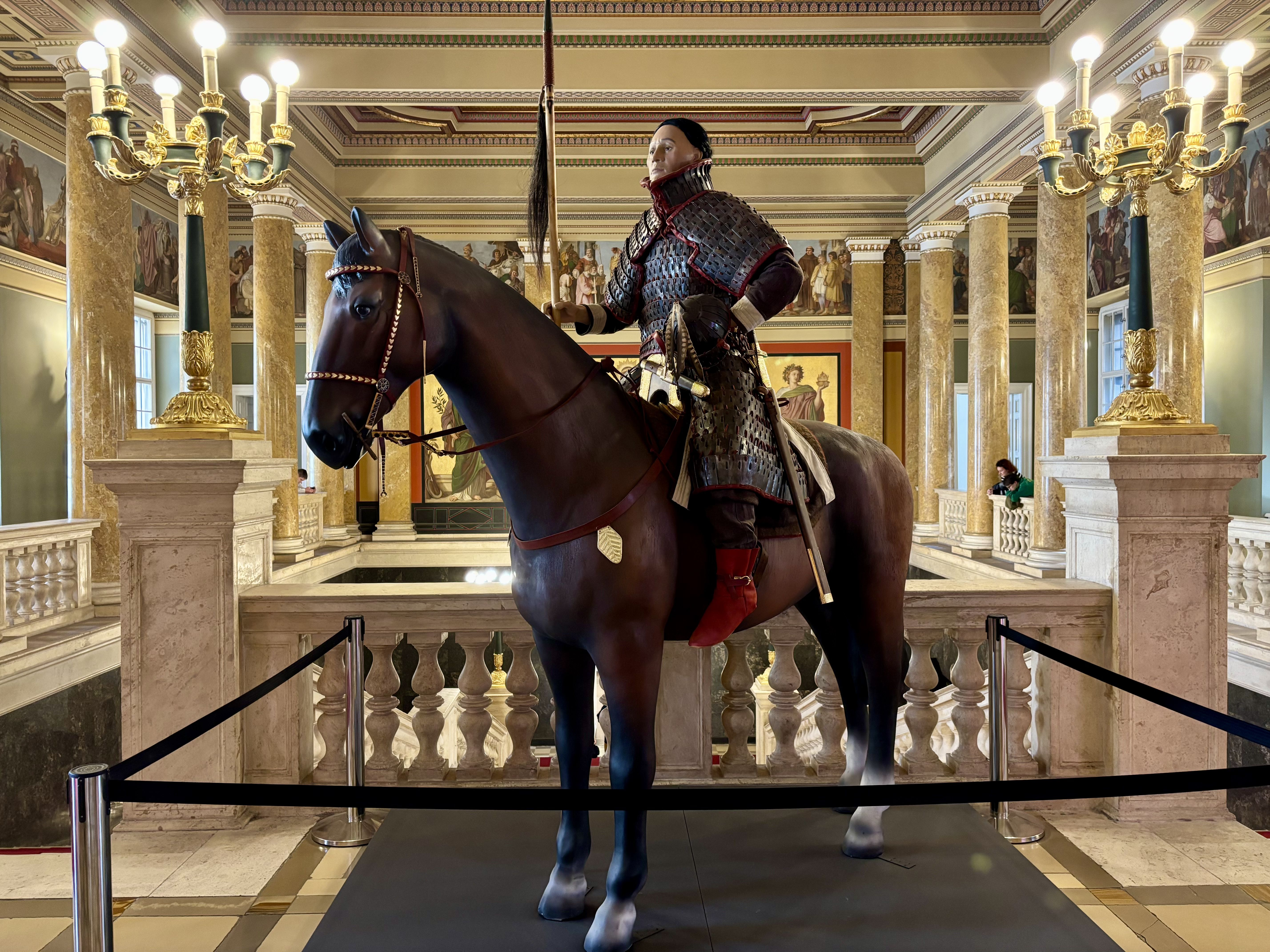
A reconstructed Hun warrior (Hungarian National Museum - Attila exhibition, 2026)

Most of the ancient descriptions of the Huns stress their strange appearance from a Roman perspective. These descriptions typically caricature the Huns as monsters. Jordanes stresses that the Huns were short of stature, had tanned skin and round and shapeless heads. Various writers mention that the Huns had small eyes and flat noses. The Roman writer Priscus gives the following eyewitness description of Attila: "Short of stature, with a broad chest and a large head; his eyes were small, his beard thin and sprinkled with grey; and he had a flat nose and tanned skin, showing evidence of his origin."

Many scholars take these to be unflattering depictions of East Asian (obsolete "Mongoloid") racial characteristics. Maenchen-Helfen argues that, while many Huns had East Asian racial characteristics, they were unlikely to have looked as Asiatic as the Yakut or Tungus. He notes that archaeological finds of presumed Huns suggest that they were a racially mixed group containing only some individuals with East Asian features. Kim similarly cautions against seeing the Huns as a homogenous racial group, while still arguing that they were "partially or predominantly of Mongoloid extraction (at least initially)." Some archaeologists have argued that archaeological finds have failed to prove that the Huns had any "Mongoloid" features at all, and some scholars have argued that the Huns were predominantly "Caucasian" in appearance. Other archaeologists have argued that "Mongoloid" features are found primarily among members of the Hunnic aristocracy, which, however, also included Germanic leaders who were integrated into the Hun polity. Kim argues that the composition of the Huns became progressively more "Caucasian" during their time in Europe; he notes that by the Battle of Chalons (451), "the vast majority" of Attila's entourage and troops appears to have been of European origin, while Attila himself seems to have had East Asian features.

=== Genetics ===
Genetic data is difficult to apply to steppe nomad societies, because they frequently migrated, intermixed, and were assimilated into each other. Genetics can still supply information on migrations from East Asia to Europe and vice versa.

In a genetic study of individuals from around the Tian Shan mountains of central Asia dating from the late second century CE, Damgaard et al. 2018 found that these individuals represented a population of mixed East Asian and West Eurasian origin. They argued that this population descended from Xiongnu who expanded westward and mixed with Iranian Sakas. This population in the Tian Shan mountains may be connected to the European Huns by individual burials that contains objects stylistically related to those used by the European Huns, although this could be a sign of the exchange of goods and the connections between elites rather than a sign of migration.

As of 2023, there is little genetic data from the Carpathian basin in the Hunnic period (5th century), and the population living there during the Hunnic period shows a variety of genetic signatures. Maróti et al. 2022 showed that the genomes of nine Hun-era individuals who lived in the basin varied from European to Northeast Asian connections, with those individuals showing associations with Northeast Asia being most similar to groups found in Mongolia such as the Xiongnu and the Xianbei. An analysis of Hun-era genomes by Gnecchi-Ruscone et al. 2022 likewise found a wide range of genetic variability, with two individuals showing a connection to ancient Northeast Asians and others showing European ancestry.

== History ==
=== Before Attila ===
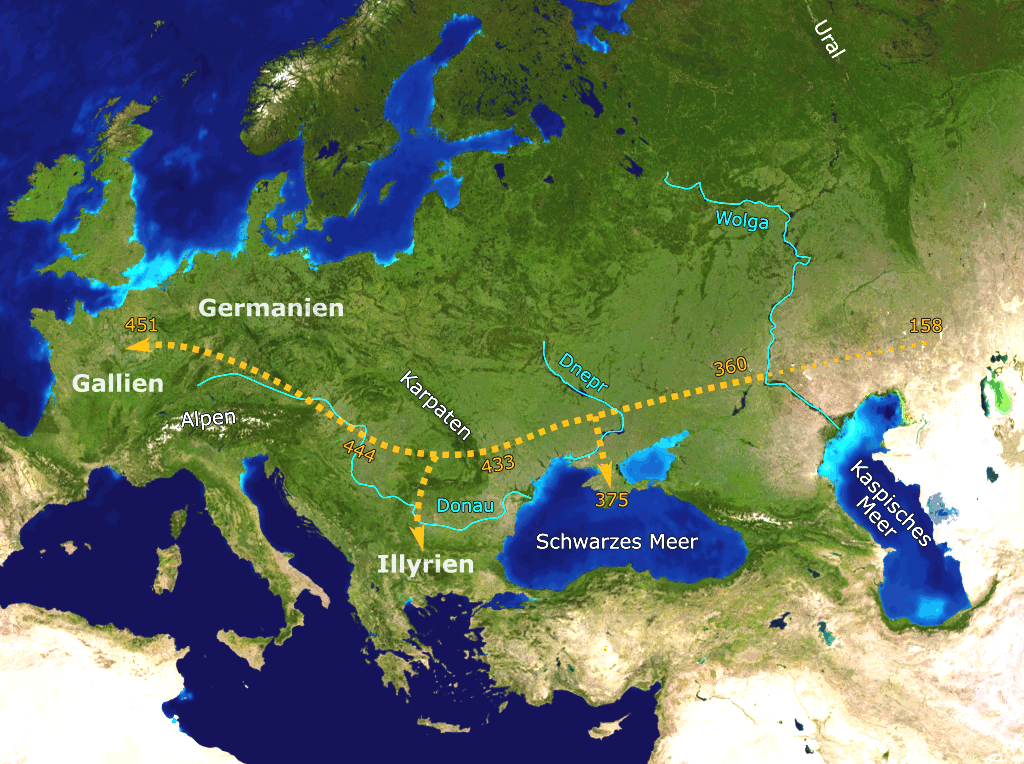
A suggested path of the Huns' movement westwards (labels in German)

The history of the Huns in the fourth century is unclear, and the Huns left no sources themselves. The Romans became aware of the Huns (Note: There is a misconception, e.g. as expressed by World History Encyclopedia, that Tacitus (c. 56 – c. 120 CE) had first mentioned the Huns in 91 CE. However, T. D. Barnes (1977) already points out that Tacitus had not at all mentioned the Huns; and that Orosius (c. 375/385 – c. 420 CE) did not ascribe knowledge about the Huns to Tacitus, but simply identified the Alans, Goths, and Huns of his time with the Scythians whom Tacitus and Justin had already mentioned.) when the latter's invasion of the Pontic steppes forced thousands of Goths to move to the Lower Danube to seek refuge in the Roman Empire in 376. The Huns conquered the Alans, most of the Greuthungi or Eastern Goths, and then most of the Thervingi or Western Goths, with many fleeing into the Roman Empire. In 395 the Huns began their first large-scale attack on the Eastern Roman Empire. Huns attacked in Thrace, overran Armenia, and pillaged Cappadocia. They entered parts of Syria, threatened Antioch, and passed through the province of Euphratesia. At the same time, the Huns invaded the Sasanian Empire. This invasion was initially successful, coming close to the capital of the empire at Ctesiphon; however, they were defeated badly during the Persian counterattack.

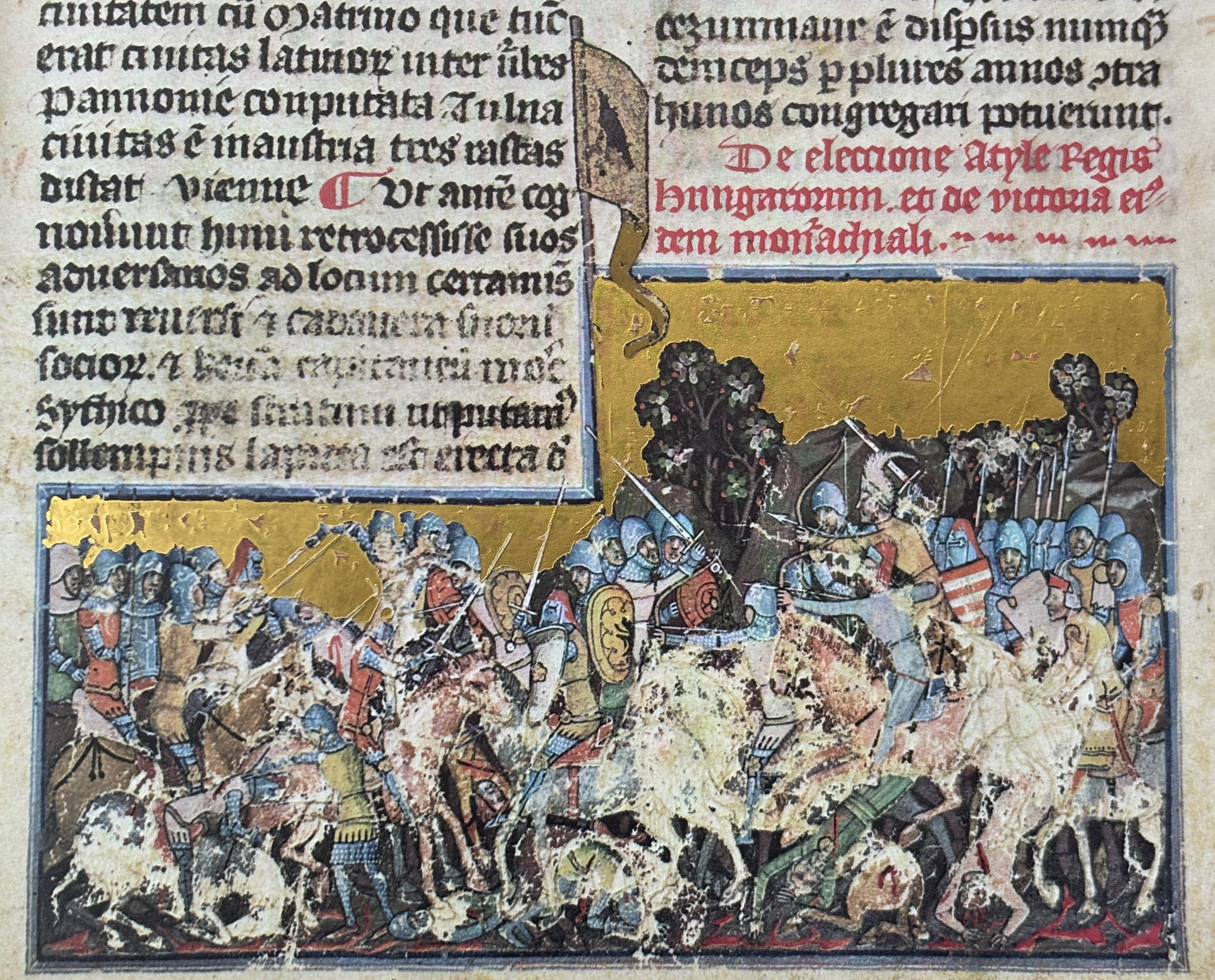
The depicted battle is the legendary Battle of Zeiselmauer when the Huns conquered Pannonia from the Romans (Chronicon Pictum, 1358)

During their brief diversion from the Eastern Roman Empire, the Huns may have threatened tribes further west. Uldin, the first Hun identified by name in contemporary sources, headed a group of Huns and Alans fighting against Radagaisus in defense of Italy. Uldin was also known for defeating Gothic rebels who troubled the East Romans around the Danube and for beheading the Goth Gainas around 400–401. The East Romans began to feel the pressure from Uldin's Huns again in 408. Uldin crossed the Danube and pillaged Thrace. The East Romans tried to buy off Uldin, but his sum was too high so they instead bought off Uldin's subordinates. This resulted in many desertions from Uldin's group of Huns. Uldin himself escaped back across the Danube, after which he is not mentioned again in history.

Hunnish mercenaries are mentioned on several occasions being employed by the East and West Romans, as well as the Goths, during the late 4th and 5th century. In 433 some parts of Pannonia were ceded to them by Flavius Aetius, the magister militum of the Western Roman Empire.

=== Under Attila ===
From 434 the brothers Attila and Bleda ruled the Huns together. Attila and Bleda were as ambitious as their uncle Rugila. In 435 they forced the Eastern Roman Empire to sign the Treaty of Margus, giving the Huns trade rights and an annual tribute from the Romans. When the Romans breached the treaty in 440, Attila and Bleda attacked Castra Constantias, a Roman fortress and marketplace on the banks of the Danube. War broke out between the Huns and Romans, and the Huns overcame a weak Roman army to raze the cities of Margus, Singidunum and Viminacium. Although a truce was concluded in 441, two years later Constantinople again failed to deliver the tribute and war resumed. In the following campaign, Hun armies approached Constantinople and sacked several cities before defeating the Romans at the Battle of Chersonesus. The Eastern Roman Emperor Theodosius II gave in to Hun demands and in autumn 443 signed the Peace of Anatolius with the two Hun kings. Bleda died in 445, and Attila became the sole ruler of the Huns.

In 447, Attila invaded the Balkans and Thrace. The war came to an end in 449 with an agreement in which the East Romans agreed to pay Attila an annual tribute of 2100 pounds of gold. Throughout their raids on the Eastern Roman Empire, the Huns had maintained good relations with the Western Empire. However, Honoria, sister of the Western Roman Emperor Valentinian III, sent Attila a ring and requested his help to escape her betrothal to a senator. Attila claimed her as his bride and half the Western Roman Empire as dowry. Additionally, a dispute arose about the rightful heir to a king of the Salian Franks. In 451, Attila's forces entered Gaul. Once in Gaul, the Huns first attacked Metz, then their armies continued westward, passing both Paris and Troyes to lay siege to Orléans. Flavius Aetius was given the duty of relieving Orléans by Emperor Valentinian III. A combined army of Roman and Visigoths then fought the Huns at the Battle of the Catalaunian Plains.

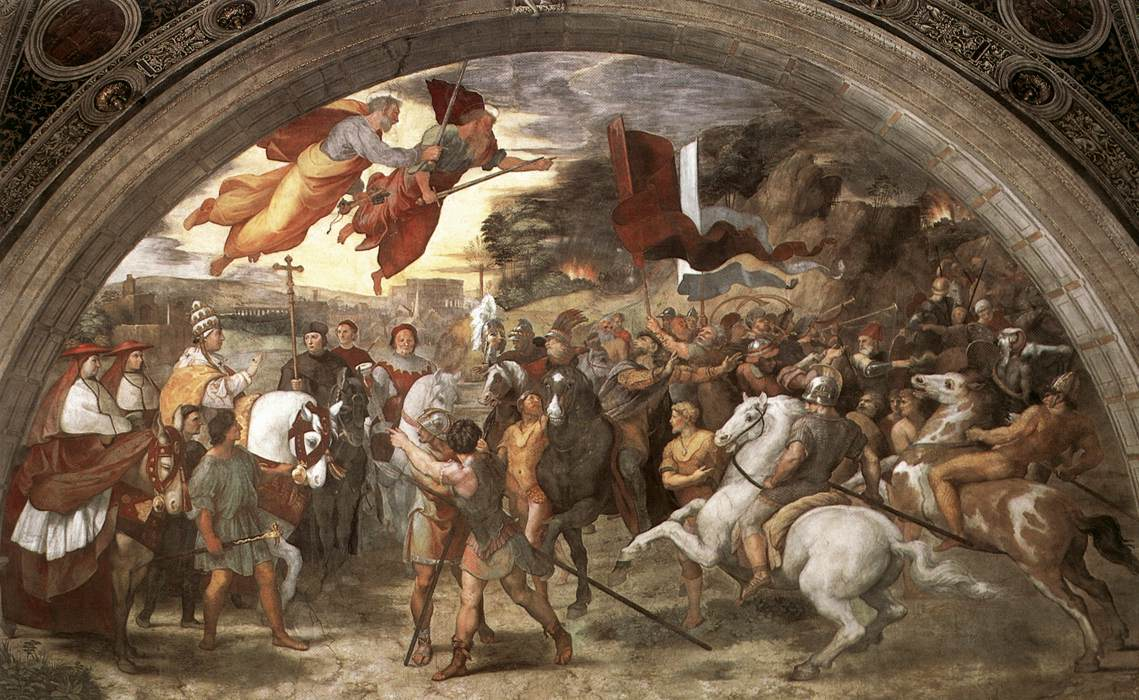
Raphael's The Meeting between Leo the Great and Attila depicts Pope Leo I, escorted by Saint Peter and Saint Paul, meeting with the Hun emperor outside Rome

The following year, Attila renewed his claims to Honoria and territory in the Western Roman Empire. Leading his army across the Alps and into Northern Italy, he sacked and razed a number of cities. Hoping to avoid the sack of Rome, Emperor Valentinian III sent three envoys, the high civilian officers Gennadius Avienus and Trigetius, as well as Pope Leo I, who met Attila at Mincio in the vicinity of Mantua, and obtained from him the promise that he would withdraw from Italy and negotiate peace with the emperor. The new Eastern Roman Emperor Marcian then halted tribute payments, resulting in Attila planning to attack Constantinople. However, in 453 Attila died of a hemorrhage on his wedding night.

=== After Attila ===
After Attila's death in 453, the Hunnic Empire faced an internal power struggle between its vassalized Germanic peoples and the Hunnic ruling body. Led by Ellak, Attila's favored son and ruler of the Akatziri, the Huns engaged the Gepid king Ardaric at the Battle of Nedao, who led a Germanic coalition to overthrow Hunnic imperial authority. The Amali Goths would revolt the same year under Valamir, allegedly defeating the Huns in a separate engagement. However, this did not result in the complete collapse of Hunnic power in the Carpathian region, but did result in the loss of many of their Germanic vassals. At the same time, the Huns were also dealing with the arrival of more Oghur Turkic-speaking peoples from the East, including the Oghurs, Saragurs, Onogurs, and the Sabirs. In 463, the Saragurs defeated the Akatziri, or Akatir Huns, and asserted dominance in the Pontic region.

The western Huns under Dengizich experienced difficulties in 461 when they were defeated by Valamir in a war against the Sadages, a people allied with the Huns. His campaigning was also met with dissatisfaction from Ernak, ruler of the Akatziri Huns, who wanted to focus on the incoming Oghur speaking peoples. Dengizich attacked the Romans in 467, without the assistance of Ernak. He was surrounded by the Romans and besieged, and came to an agreement that he would surrender if his people were given land for their herds and his starving forces given food. During the negotiations, a Hun in service of the Romans named Chelchel persuaded the enemy Goths to attack their Hun overlords. The Romans, under their General Aspar and with the help of his bucellarii, then attacked the quarreling Goths and Huns, defeating them. In 469, Dengizich was defeated and killed in Thrace.

After Dengizich's death, the Huns seem to have been absorbed by other ethnic groups such as the Bulgars. Kim, however, argues that the Huns continued under Ernak, becoming the Kutrigur and Utigur Hunno-Bulgars. This conclusion is still subject to some controversy. Some scholars also argue that another group identified in ancient sources as Huns, the North Caucasian Huns, were genuine Huns. The rulers of various post-Hunnic steppe peoples are known to have claimed descent from Attila in order to legitimize their right to the power, and various steppe peoples were also called "Huns" by Western and Byzantine sources from the fourth century onward.

== Lifestyle and economy ==
=== Pastoral nomadism ===
The Huns have traditionally been described as pastoral nomads, living off of herding and moving from pasture to pasture to graze their animals. Hyun Jin Kim, however, holds the term "nomad" to be misleading:

The term 'nomad', if it denotes a wandering group of people with no clear sense of territory, cannot be applied wholesale to the Huns. All the so-called 'nomads' of Eurasian steppe history were peoples whose territory/territories were usually clearly defined, who as pastoralists moved about in search of pasture, but within a fixed territorial space.

Maenchen-Helfen notes that pastoral nomads (or "seminomads") typically alternate between summer pastures and winter quarters: while the pastures may vary, the winter quarters always remained the same. This is, in fact, what Jordanes writes of the Hunnic Altziagiri tribe: they pastured near Cherson on the Crimea and then wintered further north, with Maenchen-Helfen holding the Syvash as a likely location. Ancient sources mention that the Huns' herds consisted of various animals, including cattle, horses, and goats; sheep, though unmentioned in ancient sources, "are more essential to the steppe nomad even than horses" and must have been a large part of their herds. Sheep bones are frequently found in Hun period graves. Additionally, Maenchen-Helfen argues that the Huns may have kept small herds of Bactrian camels in the part of their territory in modern Romania and Ukraine, something attested for the Sarmatians.

Ammianus Marcellinus says that the majority of the Huns' diet came from the meat of these animals, with Maenchen-Helfen arguing, on the basis of what is known of other steppe nomads, that they likely mostly ate mutton, along with sheep's cheese and milk. They also "certainly" ate horse meat, drank mare's milk, and likely made cheese and kumis. In times of starvation, they may have boiled their horses' blood for food.

Ancient sources uniformly deny that the Huns practiced any sort of agriculture. Thompson, taking these accounts at their word, argues that "[w]ithout the assistance of the settled agricultural population at the edge of the steppe they could not have survived". He argues that the Huns were forced to supplement their diet by hunting and gathering. Maenchen-Helfen, however, notes that archaeological finds indicate that various steppe nomad populations did grow grain; in particular, he identifies a find at Kunya Uaz in Khwarezm on the Ob River of agriculture among a people who practiced artificial cranial deformation as evidence of Hunnic agriculture. Kim similarly argues that all steppe empires have possessed both pastoralist and sedentary populations, classifying the Huns as "agro-pastoralist".

=== Horses and transportation ===
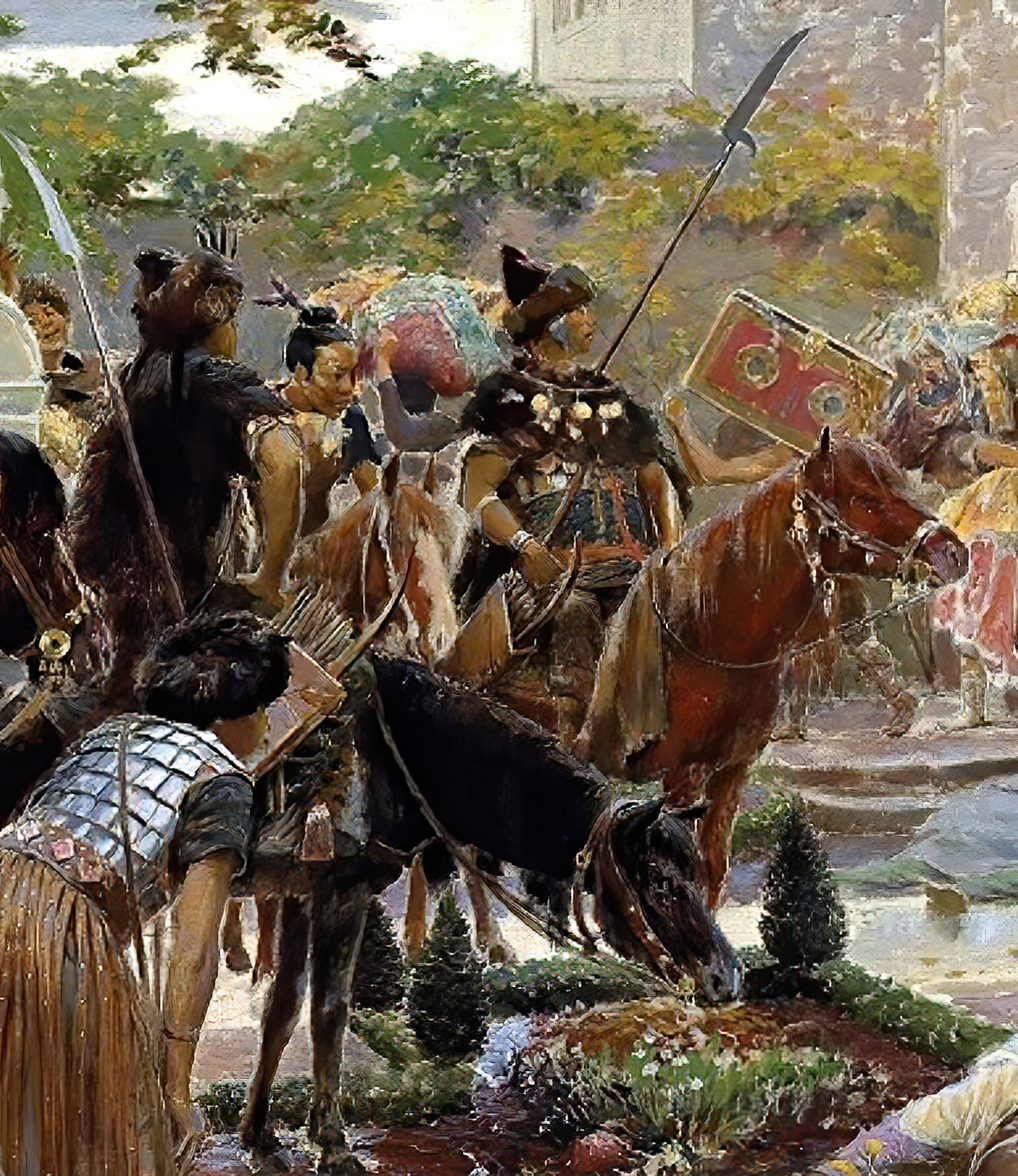
Huns by G. Rochegrosse (detail)

As a nomadic people, the Huns spent a great deal of time riding horses: Ammianus claimed that the Huns "are almost glued to their horses", Zosimus claimed that they "live and sleep on their horses", and Sidonius claimed that "scarce had an infant learnt to stand without his mother's aid when a horse takes him on his back". They appear to have spent so much time riding that they walked clumsily, something observed in other nomadic groups. Roman sources characterize the Hunnic horses as ugly. It is not possible to determine the exact breed of horse the Huns used, despite a relatively good description by the Roman writer Vegetius. Sinor believes that it was likely a breed of Mongolian pony. However, horse remains are absent from all identified Hun burials. Based on anthropological descriptions and archaeological finds of other nomadic horses, Maenchen-Helfen believes that they rode mostly geldings.

Apart from horses, ancient sources indicate that the Huns used wagons for transportation. Maenchen-Helfen suggests that these wagons were mainly used to carry their tents, loot, as well as the elderly, women, and children.

=== Economic relations with the Romans ===
The Huns received a large amount of gold from the Romans, either in exchange for fighting for them as mercenaries or as tribute. Raiding and looting also furnished the Huns with gold and other valuables. Denis Sinor has argued that at the time of Attila, the Hunnic economy became almost entirely dependent on plunder and tribute from the Roman provinces.

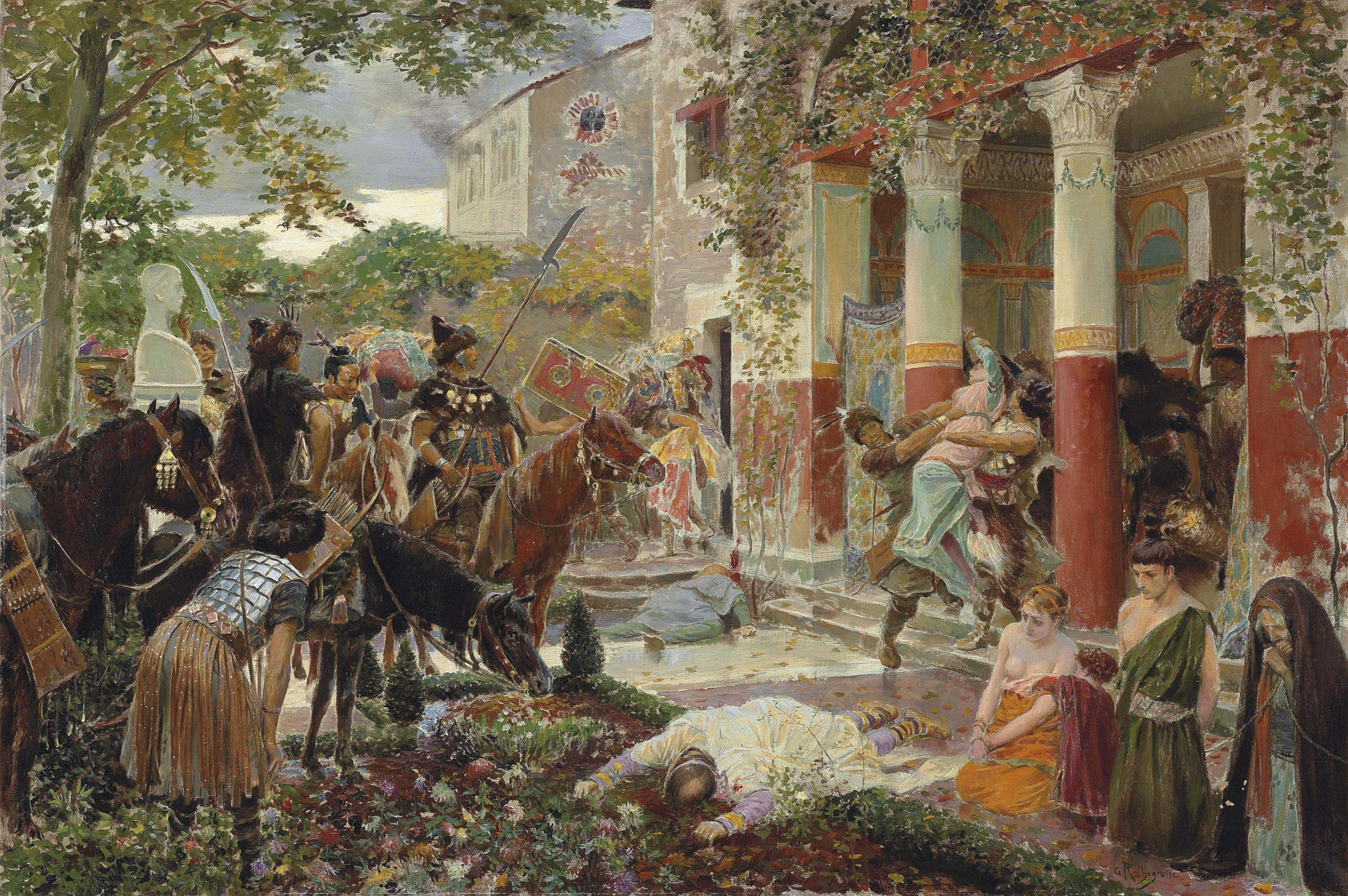
1910 Rochegrosse depiction of a Roman villa in Gaul sacked by the hordes of Attila the Hun

Civilians and soldiers captured by the Huns might also be ransomed back, or else sold to Roman slave dealers as slaves. The Huns themselves, Maenchen-Helfen argued, had little use for slaves due to their nomadic pastoralist lifestyle. More recent scholarship, however, has demonstrated that pastoral nomadists are actually more likely to use slave labor than sedentary societies: the slaves would have been used to manage the Huns' herds of cattle, sheep, and goats. Priscus attests that slaves were used as domestic servants, but also that educated slaves were used by the Huns in positions of administration or even architects. Some slaves were even used as warriors.

The Huns also traded with the Romans. E. A. Thompson argued that this trade was very large scale, with the Huns trading horses, furs, meat, and slaves for Roman weapons, linen, and grain, and various other luxury goods. While Maenchen-Helfen concedes that the Huns traded their horses for what he considered to have been "a very considerable source of income in gold", he is otherwise skeptical of Thompson's argument. He notes that the Romans strictly regulated trade with the barbarians and that, according to Priscus, trade only occurred at a fair once a year. While he notes that smuggling also likely occurred, he argues that "the volume of both legal and illegal trade was apparently modest". He does note that wine and silk appear to have been imported into the Hunnic Empire in large quantities, however. Roman gold coins appear to have been in circulation as currency within the whole of the Hunnic Empire.

=== Connections to the Silk Road ===
Christopher Atwood has suggested that the purpose of the original Hunnic incursion into Europe may have been to establish an outlet to the Black Sea for the Sogdian merchants under their rule, who were involved in the trade along the Silk Road to China. Atwood notes that Jordanes describes how the Crimean city of Cherson, "where the avaricious traders bring in the goods of Asia", was under the control of the Akatziri Huns in the sixth century.

== Empire and rule ==
=== Government ===
Hunnic governmental structure has long been debated. Peter Heather argues that the Huns were a disorganized confederation in which leaders acted completely independently and that eventually established a ranking hierarchy, much like Germanic societies. Denis Sinor similarly notes that, with the exception of the historically uncertain Balamber, no Hun leaders are named in the sources until Uldin, indicating their relative unimportance. Thompson argues that permanent kingship only developed with the Huns' invasion of Europe and the near-constant warfare that followed. Regarding the organization of Hunnic rule under Attila, Peter Golden comments "it can hardly be called a state, much less an empire". Golden speaks instead of a "Hunnic confederacy". Kim, however, argues that the Huns were far more organized and centralized, with some basis in organization of the Xiongnu state. Walter Pohl notes the correspondences of Hunnic government to those of other steppe empires, but nevertheless argues that the Huns do not appear to have been a unified group when they arrived in Europe.

Ammianus wrote that the Huns of his day had no kings, but rather that each group of Huns instead had a group of leading men (primates) for times of war. E. A. Thompson supposes that, even in war, the leading men had little actual power. He further argues that they most likely did not acquire their position purely hereditarily. Heather, however, argues that Ammianus merely meant that the Huns didn't have a single ruler; he notes that Olympiodorus mentions the Huns having several kings, with one being the "first of the kings". Ammianus also mentions that the Huns made their decisions in a general council (omnes in commune) while seated on horseback. He makes no mention of the Huns being organized into tribes, but Priscus and other writers do, naming some of them.

The first Hunnic ruler known by name is Uldin. Thompson takes Uldin's sudden disappearance after he was unsuccessful at war as a sign that the Hunnic kingship was "democratic" at this time rather than a permanent institution. Kim, however, argues that Uldin is actually a title and that he was likely merely a subking. Priscus calls Attila "king" or "emperor" (βασιλέυς), but it is unknown what native title he was translating. With the exception of the sole rule of Attila, the Huns often had two rulers; Attila himself later appointed his son Ellac as co-king. Heather argues that by the time of the report of Olympiodorus, the Huns at some point developed a system of ranked kings, including a senior king by the time of Charaton.

Priscus also speaks of "picked men" or logades (λογάδες) forming part of Attila's government, naming five of them. Some of the "picked men" seem to have been chosen because of birth, others for reasons of merit. Thompson argued that these "picked men" "were the hinge upon which the entire administration of the Hun empire turned": he argues for their existence in the government of Uldin, and that each had command over detachments of the Hunnic army and ruled over specific portions of the Hunnic empire, where they were responsible also for collecting tribute and provisions. Maenchen-Helfen, however, argues that the word logades denotes simply prominent individuals and not a fixed rank with fixed duties. Kim affirms the importance of the logades for Hunnic administration, but notes that there were differences of rank between them, and suggests that it was more likely lower ranking officials who gathered taxes and tribute. He suggests that various Roman defectors to the Huns may have worked in a sort of imperial bureaucracy. Unlike the Iranian Huns, who quickly began to mint their own coinage, the European Huns did not strike their own coins.

=== Extent of Hunnic territory ===
The extent of Hunnish control in Barbarian Europe is poorly understood, as it is not much covered in Roman sources. It is generally assumed that they established an empire that stretched as far West as the Rhine and perhaps as far north as the Baltic, though it is difficult to establish its boundaries with certainty. Some scholars, such as Otto Maenchen-Helfen and Peter Golden, believe that the extent of Attila's empire has been exaggerated and he probably only controlled Pannonia and some adjacent areas.

In the 390s, the majority of the Huns were probably based around the Volga and Don on the Pontic Steppe. But by the 420s, the Huns were based on the Great Hungarian Plain, the only large grassland near the Roman empire capable of supporting large numbers of horses. However, Aleksander Paroń believes that they likely continued to control the Pontic Steppe north of the Black Sea. They had conquered the Hungarian Plain in stages. The precise date that they conquered the north bank of the Danube is unclear. Maenchen-Helfen argued that they may have already taken control of it in the 370s. The dates when they gained control of the Roman territory south of the Middle Danube, Pannonia Valeria and the other provinces of Pannonia, is likewise disputed, but probably in 406/407 and 431/433 respectively. Otherwise, the Huns made no attempt to conquer or settle on Roman territory. Following Attila's death, the Huns were driven out of Pannonia and some appear to have returned to the Pontic Steppe, while one group settled in Dobruja.

One of the only written sources for the size of Attila's domain is given by the Roman historian Priscus. Priscus refers to Attila ruling as far as the islands in the "ocean" (Ὠκεανός), but it is unclear if this meant the Baltic Sea or the world-encircling Ocean that the Greeks and Romans believed in. In either case, the description of Attila ruling as far as the islands in the "ocean" may be hyperbole. Archaeology is often used to argue for an area having been under Hunnic control; however, nomadic peoples often control territories beyond their immediate settlement. A large number of major finds from Silesia and Lesser Poland, north of the Carpathian Mountains, have been attributed to the time of Attila and associated with the nomadic milieu of the Huns. While scholars have speculated about direct Hunnic control and settlement here, it is entirely unclear what kind of relationship the population of these regions had to the Huns.

=== Subject peoples ===
The Huns ruled over numerous other groups, including Goths, Gepids, Sarmatians, Heruli, Alans, Rugii, Suevi, and Sciri, alongside other groups where they occasionally asserted control. Peter Heather suggests that some of these groups were resettled along the Danube by the Huns. Subject peoples of the Huns were led by their own kings. Those recognized as ethnic Huns appear to have had more rights and status, as evidenced by the account of Priscus.

=== Warfare ===
One of the principal sources of information on Hunnic warfare is Ammianus Marcellinus, who includes an extended description of the Huns' methods of war:

They also sometimes fight when provoked, and then they enter the battle drawn up in wedge-shaped masses, while their medley of voices makes a savage noise. And as they are lightly equipped for swift motion, and unexpected in action, they purposely divide suddenly into scattered bands and attack, rushing about in disorder here and there, dealing terrific slaughter; and because of their extraordinary rapidity of movement they are never seen to attack a rampart or pillage an enemy's camp. And on this account you would not hesitate to call them the most terrible of all warriors, because they fight from a distance with missiles having sharp bone, instead of their usual points, joined to the shafts with wonderful skill; then they gallop over the intervening spaces and fight hand to hand with swords, regardless of their own lives; and while the enemy are guarding against wounds from the sabre-thrusts, they throw strips of cloth plaited into nooses over their opponents and so entangle them that they fetter their limbs and take from them the power of riding or walking.

Based on Ammianus' description, Maenchen-Helfen argues that the Huns' tactics did not differ markedly from those used by other nomadic horse archers. He argues that the "wedge-shaped masses" (cunei) mentioned by Ammianus were likely divisions organized by tribal clans and families, whose leaders may have been called a cur. This title would then have been inherited as it was passed down the clan. Like Ammianus, the sixth-century writer Zosimus also emphasizes the Huns' almost exclusive use of horse archers and their extreme swiftness and mobility. These qualities differed from other nomadic warriors in Europe at this time: the Sarmatians, for instance, relied on heavily armored cataphracts armed with lances. The Huns' use of terrible war cries are also found in other sources. However, a number of Ammianus's claims have been challenged by modern scholars. In particular, while Ammianus claims that the Huns knew no metalworking, Maenchen-Helfen argues that a people so primitive could never have been successful in war against the Romans.

Hunnic armies relied on their high mobility and "a shrewd sense of when to attack and when to withdraw". An important strategy used by the Huns was a feigned retreat—pretending to flee and then turning and attacking the disordered enemy. This is mentioned by the writers Zosimus and Agathias. They were, however, not always effective in pitched battle, suffering defeat at the Battle of Toulouse in 439, barely winning at the Battle of the Utus in 447, likely losing or stalemating at the Battle of the Catalaunian Plains in 451, and losing at the Battle of Nedao (454?). Christopher Kelly argues that Attila sought to avoid "as far as possible, [...] large-scale engagement with the Roman army". War and the threat of war were frequently used tools to extort Rome; the Huns often relied on local traitors to avoid losses. Accounts of battles note that the Huns fortified their camps by using portable fences or creating a circle of wagons.

The Huns' nomadic lifestyle encouraged features such as excellent horsemanship, while the Huns trained for war by frequent hunting. Several scholars have suggested that the Huns had trouble maintaining their horse cavalry and nomadic lifestyle after settling on the Hungarian Plain, and that this in turn led to a marked decrease in their effectiveness as fighters.

The Huns are almost always noted as fighting alongside non-Hunnic, Germanic or Iranian subject peoples or, in earlier times, allies. As Heather notes, "the Huns' military machine increased, and increased very quickly, by incorporating ever larger numbers of the Germani of central and eastern Europe". At the Battle of the Catalaunian Plains, Attila is noted by Jordanes to have placed his subject peoples in the wings of the army, while the Huns held the center.

Peter Heather notes that the Huns were able to successfully besiege walled cities and fortresses in their campaign of 441: they were thus capable of building siege engines. Heather makes note of multiple possible routes for acquisition of this knowledge, suggesting that it could have been brought back from service under Aetius, acquired from captured Roman engineers, or developed through the need to pressure the wealthy silk road city states, and carried over into Europe.

== Society and culture ==
=== Artificial cranial deformation ===
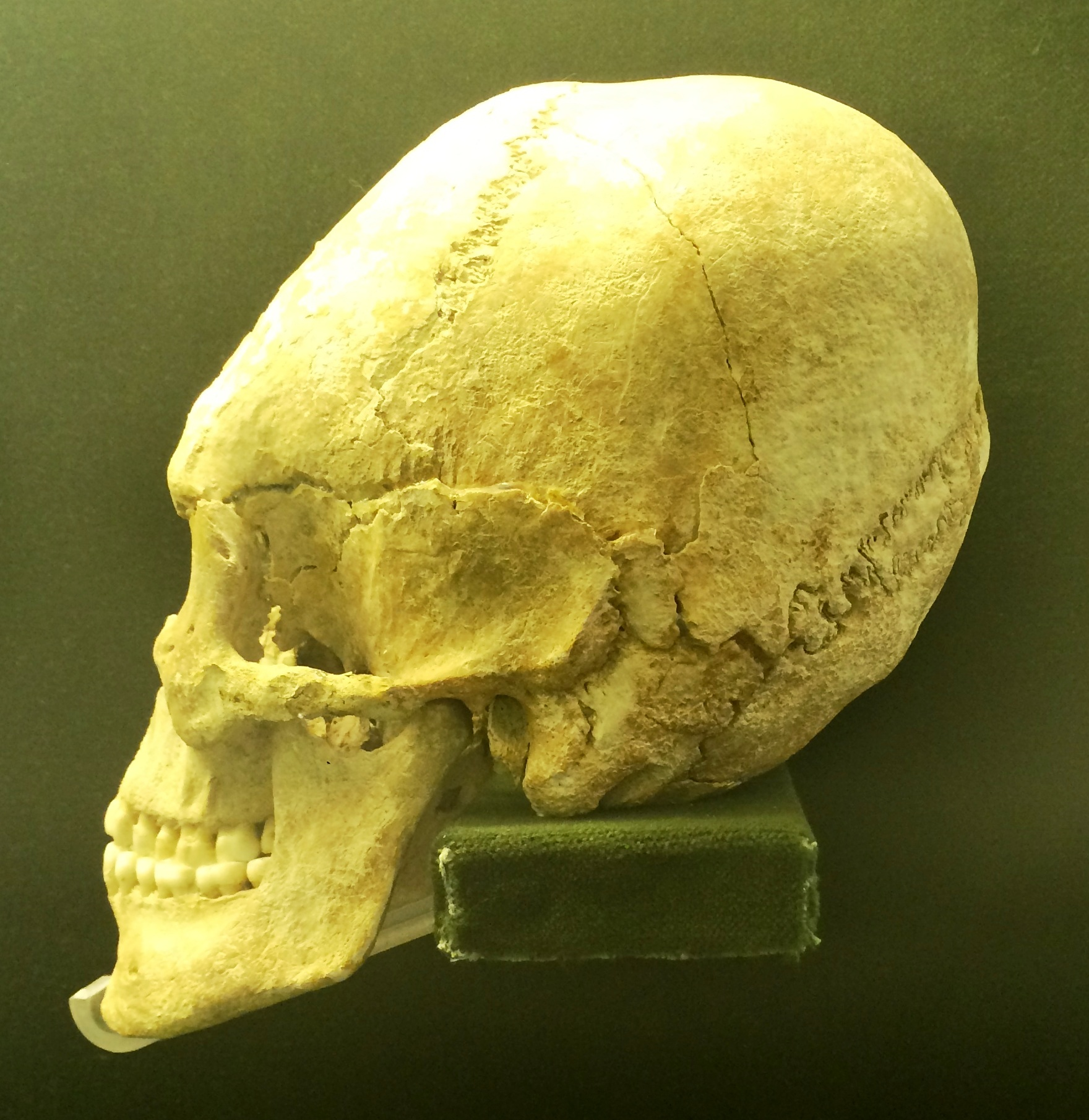
Skull of a Hun-period person found in Hungary showing artificial cranial deformation. Over 200 artificially deformed skulls have been found in the Carpathian Basin from the Hun and Avar periods.

Artificial cranial deformation, the process of artificially lengthening the skulls of babies by binding them, first appears in Europe on the Pontic Steppe in the 2nd and 3rd centuries CE, before spreading to the Carpathian basin, becoming common there in the 5th century. During the Hun period, between 50% and 80% of all burials in the Carpathian basin contain individuals with artificial cranial deformation. This chronology and its spread in Europe has been linked to nomadic invasions from Asia and in particularly the spread of the Huns, with the argument that it was practiced by their nobility and then taken up by Germanic groups influenced by them, in particular the Gepids. Some scholars argue that the practice was not originally introduced to Europe by the Huns, however, but rather with the Alans, with whom the Huns were closely associated, and Sarmatians.

In Kim's view, the goal of this process was "to create a clear physical distinction between the nobility and the general populace". Susanne Hakenbeck, however, notes that graves with individuals who had undergone artificial cranial deformation are not usually distinct from other individuals; she suggests instead that the process was used to show kinship and distinguish families, something attested for the practice in Mesoamerica.

=== Languages ===
A variety of languages were spoken within the Hun Empire. Priscus noted that the Hunnic language differed from other languages spoken at Attila's court. He recounts how Attila's jester Zerco made Attila's guests laugh also by the "promiscuous jumble of words, Latin mixed with Hunnish and Gothic." Priscus said that Attila's "Scythian" subjects spoke "besides their own barbarian tongues, either Hunnish, or Gothic, or, as many have dealings with the Western Romans, Latin; but not one of them easily speaks Greek, except captives from the Thracian or Illyrian frontier regions". Some scholars have argued that Gothic was used as the lingua franca of the Hunnic Empire. Hyun Jin Kim argues that the Huns may have used as many as four languages at various levels of government, without any one being dominant: Hunnic, Gothic, Latin, and Sarmatian.

As to the Hunnic language itself, there is no consensus on its relationship to other languages. Only three words are recorded in ancient sources as being "Hunnic," all of which appear to be from an Indo-European language. All other information on Hunnic is contained in personal names and tribal ethnonyms. On the basis of these names, scholars have proposed that Hunnic may have been a Turkic language, a language between Mongolic and Turkic, an Eastern Iranian language, or a Yeniseian language. However, given the small corpus, many hold the language to be unclassifiable.

=== Marriage and the role of women ===
The elites of the Huns practiced polygamy, while the commoners were probably monogamous. Ammianus Marcellinus claimed that the Hunnish women lived in seclusion; however, the first-hand account of Priscus shows them freely moving and mixing with men. Priscus describes Hunnic women swarming around Attila as he entered a village, as well as the wife of Attila's minister Onegesius offering the king food and drink with her servants. Priscus was able to enter the tent of Attila's chief wife, Hereca, without difficulty.

Priscus also attests that the widow of Attila's brother Bleda was in command of a village that the Roman ambassadors rode through: her territory may have included a larger area. Thompson notes that other steppe peoples, such as the Utigurs and the Sabirs, are known to have had female tribal leaders, and argues that the Huns probably held widows in high respect. Due to the pastoral nature of the Huns' economy, the women likely had a large degree of authority over the domestic household.

=== Religion ===
Almost nothing is known about the religion of the Huns. Roman writer Ammianus Marcellinus claimed that the Huns had no religion, while the fifth-century Christian writer Salvian classified them as Pagans. Jordanes' Getica also records that the Huns worshipped "the sword of Mars", an ancient sword that signified Attila's right to rule the whole world. Maenchen-Helfen notes a widespread worship of a war god in the form of a sword among steppe peoples, including among the Xiongnu. Denis Sinor, however, holds the worship of a sword among the Huns to be apocryphal. Additionally, Maenchen-Helfen argues that, while the Huns themselves do not appear to have regarded Attila as divine, some of his subject people clearly did. A belief in prophecy and divination is also attested among the Huns. Maenchen-Helfen argues that the performers of these acts of soothsaying and divination were likely shamans. (Note: He argues for the existence of Hunnic shamans on the basis of the presence of the element kam in the Hunnic names Atakam and Eskam, which he derives from the Turkic qam, meaning shaman.) Sinor also finds it likely that the Huns had shamans, although they are completely unattested. Maenchen-Helfen further deduces a belief in water-spirits from a custom mentioned in Ammianus. (Note: He derives this belief from a Hunnic custom, attested in Ammianus, that the Huns did not wash their clothes: among later steppe peoples, this is done to avoid offending the water-spirits.) He furthermore suggests that the Huns may have made small metal, wooden, or stone idols, which are attested among other steppe tribes, and which a Byzantine source attests for the Huns in Crimea in the sixth century. Moreover, he connects archaeological finds of Hunnish bronze cauldrons found buried near or in running water to possible rituals performed by the Huns in the Spring.

John Man argues that the Huns of Attila's time likely worshipped the sky and the steppe deity Tengri, who is also attested as having been worshipped by the Xiongnu. Maenchen-Helfen also suggests the possibility that the Huns of this period may have worshipped Tengri, but notes that the god is not attested in European records until the ninth century. Worship of Tengri under the name "T'angri Khan" is attested among the Caucasian Huns in the Armenian chronicle attributed to Movses Dasxuranci during the later seventh-century. Movses also records that the Caucasian Huns worshipped trees and burnt horses as sacrifices to Tengri, and that they "made sacrifices to fire and water and to certain gods of the roads, and to the moon and to all creatures considered in their eyes to be in some way remarkable."

There is some evidence for human sacrifice among the European Huns. Maenchen-Helfen argues that humans appear to have been sacrificed at Attila's funerary rite, recorded in Jordanes under the name strava. Priscus claims that the Huns sacrificed their prisoners "to victory" after they entered Scythia, but this is not otherwise attested as a Hunnic custom and may be fiction.

In addition to these Pagan beliefs, there are numerous attestations of Huns converting to Christianity and receiving Christian missionaries. The missionary activities among the Huns of the Caucasus seem to have been particularly successful, resulting in the conversion of the Hunnish prince Alp Ilteber. Attila appears to have tolerated both Nicene and Arian Christianity among his subjects. However, a pastoral letter by Pope Leo the Great to the church of Aquileia indicates that Christian slaves taken from there by the Huns in 452 were forced to participate in Hunnic religious activities.

=== Burials and burial customs ===
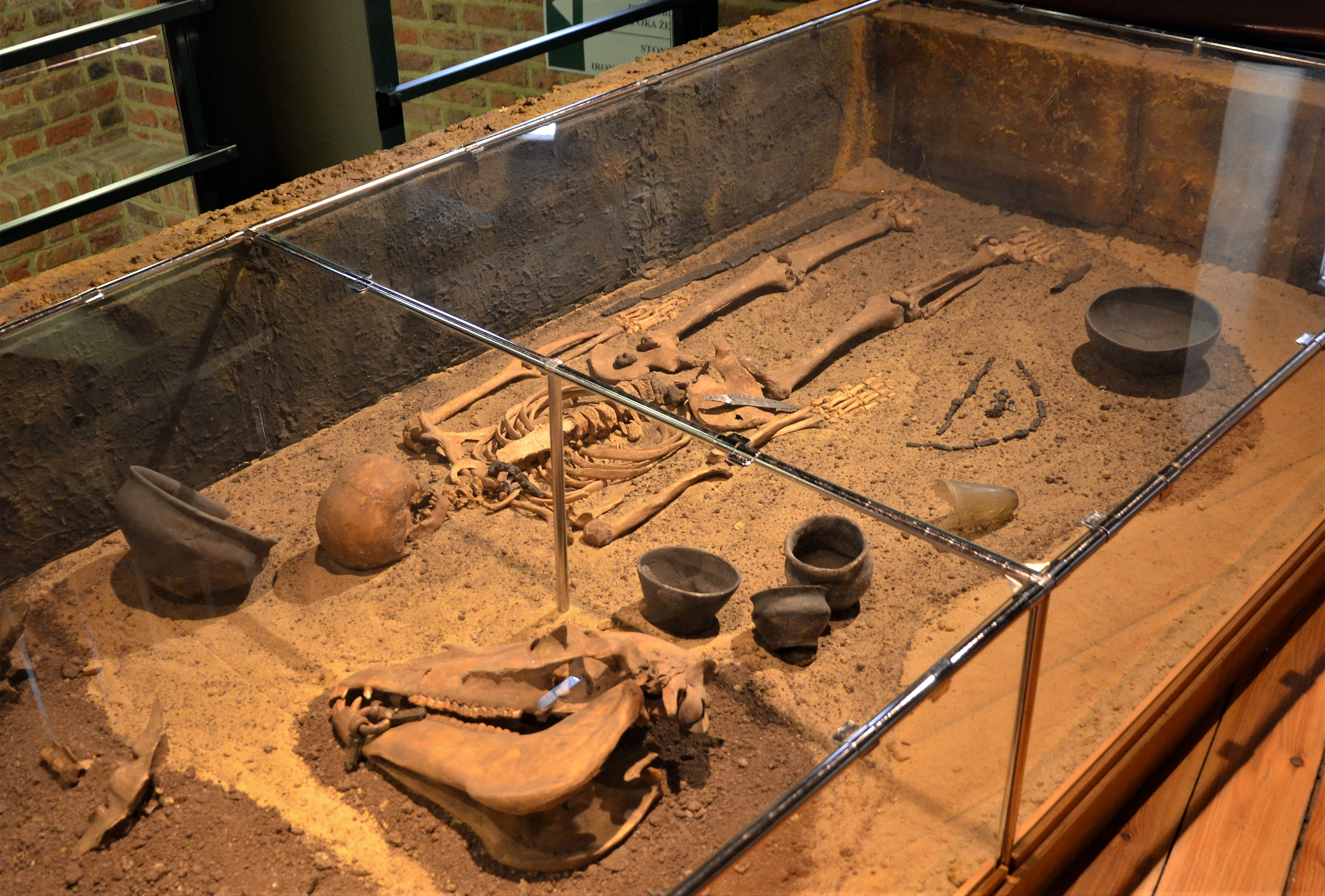
Nomad-style burial of a warrior from Ługi, Migration period in Silesia. The grave shows many similarities to burials along the Black Sea among the Alano-Sarmatian milieu.

An account of the funeral of Attila is provided by Jordanes, who may derive it from Priscus: Jordanes reports that the Huns cut their hair and disfigured their faces with swords as part of the rite, a widely attested custom among steppe peoples. After this, Attila's coffin was placed in a silk tent, and horsemen rode around it singing funeral dirges called a strava. The coffin was then covered in precious metals and buried secretly together with weapons, and the slaves who dug the grave were killed to keep the location secret. Maenchen-Helfen suggests that the dirges and the horsemanship were likely separate events, with the latter possibly representing funereal horse races as found among other steppe peoples, while the killing of the slaves may have been a sacrifice.

Although a great amount of archaeological material has been unearthed since 1945, as of 2005 there were only 200 burials that have plausibly identified as Hunnic, including both in the Carpathian Basin and the Pontic Steppe. Hun-period burials identified with the nomadic milieu on the Eurasian steppe and in the Carpathian Basin typically feature rich deposits of grave goods, which modern archaeologists call Totenopfer (offerings to the dead). However, the richest nomad-related burials have all been found in other locations than the Carpathian Basin, although this was Attila's center of power and one would expect to find elite burials clustered there. Most burials from the Carpathian Basin match the material culture of the previously indigenous Germanic peoples; the dearth of Hun related burials may indicate that most Hunnish funerals may have disposed of the body in such a way that no remains were left, or that they adopted Germanic material culture.

Frequently, nomad-related graves from the Hun period contain evidence of objects being burned, probably as part of the burial ceremonies. The common nomadic practice of burying parts of animals, such as their shoulder blades or limbs, with the deceased is only attested rarely in the Carpathian Basin. Likewise, while Central Asian and East European nomad burials frequently feature kurgans, these are entirely absent in the Carpathian basin.

== Material culture ==
There are two sources for the material culture of the Huns: ancient descriptions and archaeology. Roman descriptions of the Huns are often highly biased, stressing the Huns' supposed primitiveness. Unfortunately, the nomadic nature of Hun society means that they have left very little in the archaeological record. It can be difficult to distinguish Hunnic archaeological finds from those of the Sarmatians, as both peoples lived in close proximity and seem to have had very similar material cultures. Kim thus cautions that it is difficult to assign any artifact to the Huns ethnically.

=== Cauldrons ===
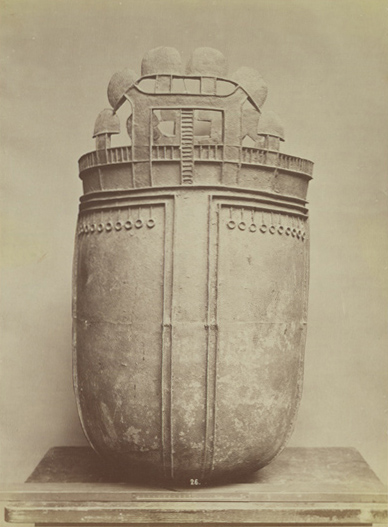
A Hunnish cauldron

Archaeological finds have produced a large number of cauldrons that have since the work of Paul Reinecke in 1896 been identified as having been produced by the Huns. Although typically described as "bronze cauldrons", the cauldrons are often made of copper, which is generally of poor quality. Maenchen-Helfen lists 19 known finds of Hunnish cauldrons from all over Central and Eastern Europe and Western Siberia. He argues from the state of the bronze castings that the Huns were not very good metalsmiths, and that it is likely that the cauldrons were cast in the same locations where they were found. They come in various shapes, and are sometimes found together with vessels of various other origins. Maenchen-Helfen argues that the cauldrons were cooking vessels for boiling meat, but that the fact that many are found deposited near water and were generally not buried with individuals may indicate a sacral usage as well. The cauldrons appear to derive from those used by the Xiongnu.

=== Clothing ===
Good descriptions of Hun period clothing, known from contemporary Central Asian burials to have probably been the khalat, are lacking in Greco-Roman sources. The East Roman historian Priscus reports seeing a Greek merchant who he took for a Hun due to his wearing "Scythian" clothing; this appears to show that the Huns wore a distinct outfit that was part of ethnic identification. Ammianus reports that the Huns wore clothes made of linen or the furs of mice and leggings of goatskin, which they did not wash. While the use of furs and linen may be accurate, the description of the Huns in dirty animal skins and wearing the skins of mice is clearly derived from negative stereotypes and topoi about primitive barbarians. Priscus also mentions the use of various expensive and rare animal furs, and mentions the handmaidens of Attila's queen Kreka weaving decorative linen.

Using finds from modern Kazakhstan, archaeologist Joachim Werner has described Hunnic clothing as probably consisting of knee-length, sleeved smocks (the khalat), which were sometimes made of silk, as well as trousers and leather boots. Saint Jerome and Ammianus both describe the Huns as wearing a round cap that was probably made of felt. Because nomadic clothing had no need for brooches, the absence of this otherwise common item in some Barbarian burials may indicate Hunnic cultural influence. According to Maenchen-Helfen, the Huns' shoes were likely made of sheep's leather. The Bántapuszta figurine is wearing high, bulky boots that are connected to the warrior's chainmail by straps, of a type also described by Priscus.

=== Artistic decoration ===
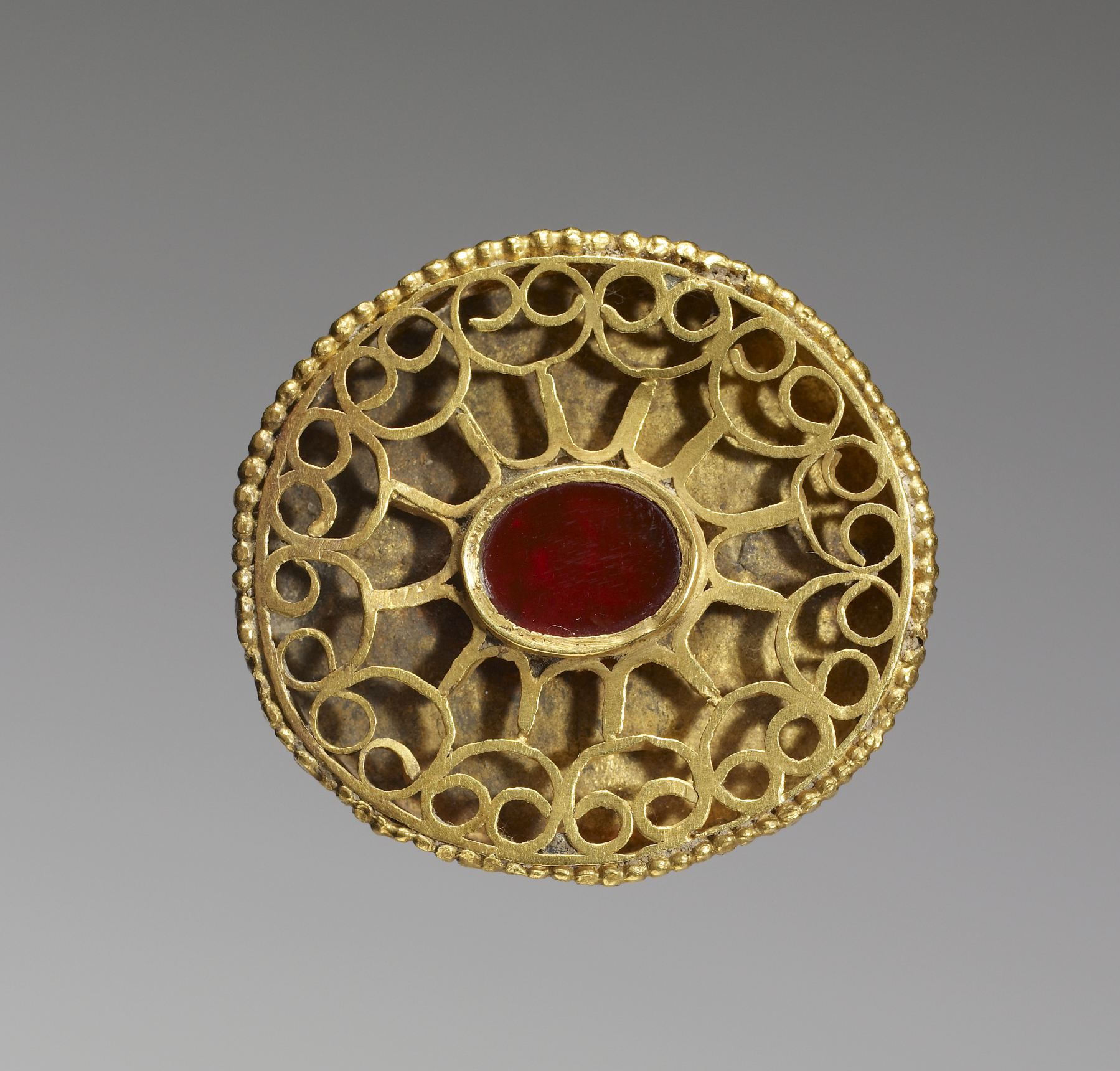
A Hunnish oval openwork fibula set with a carnelian and decorated with a geometric pattern of gold wire, 4th century, Walters Art Museum

Jewelry and weapons attributed to the Huns are often decorated in a polychrome, cloisonné style. Archaeologist Joachim Werner argued that the Huns developed a unique "Danubian" style of art that combined Asiatic goldsmithing techniques with the enormous amount of gold given as tribute to the Huns by the Romans; this style then influenced European art. In the 1970s, A. K. Ambroz argued that the polychrome style originated with the Huns; however, more recent archaeological discoveries show that it predates their arrival in Europe. Warwick Ball, moreover, argues that the decorated artifacts of the Hunnish period were probably made by local craftsmen for the Huns rather than by the Huns themselves.

A now headless copper-plated Hun-period figurine discovered at Bántapuszta near Veszprém, Hungary, shows a man in armor whose pants and collars have been decorated by ringlets. Archaeological finds indicate that the Huns wore gold plaques as ornaments on their clothing, as well as imported glass beads. The golden plaques were probably used to decorate the hems of both male and female festive clothing; this fashion seems to have been adopted both by the Huns and East Germanic elites. Both men and women have been found wearing shoe buckles made of gold and jewels in Eastern Europe, but of iron or bronze in Central Asia; the golden shoe buckles are also found in non-Hunnic graves in Europe.

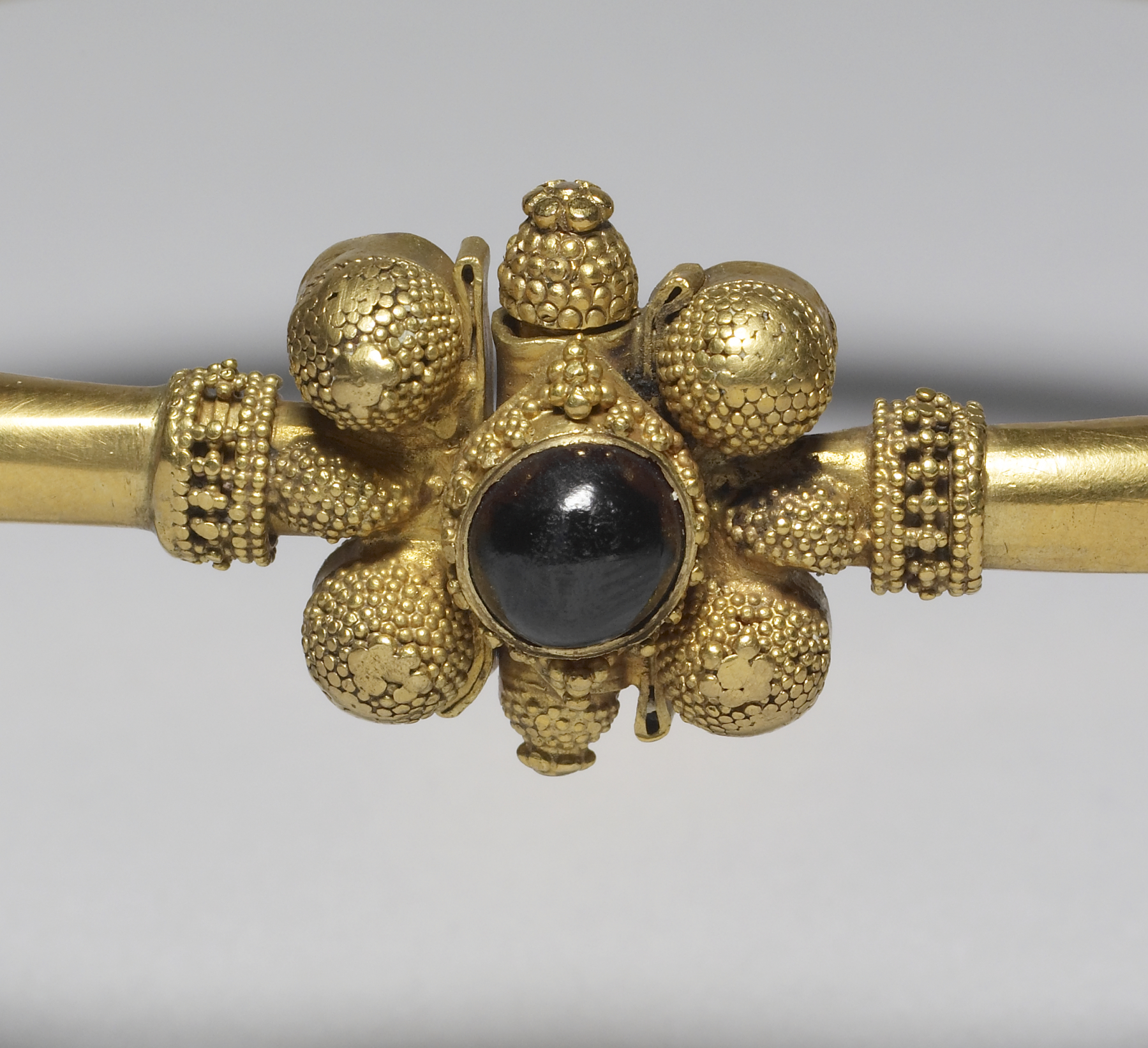
Detail of Hunnish gold and garnet bracelet, 5th century, Walters Art Museum

Both ancient sources and archaeological finds from graves confirm that the Hunnic women wore elaborately decorated golden or gold-plated diadems. These diadems, as well as elements of bonnets, were probably symbols of rulership. Women are also found buried with small mirrors of an originally Chinese type, which often appear to have been intentionally broken when placed into a grave. Hunnic women seem to have worn necklaces and bracelets of mostly imported beads of various materials as well. Men are often found buried with single or paired earrings and, unusually for a nomadic people, bronze or golden neck rings.

=== Tents and dwellings ===
Ammianus reports that the Huns had no buildings, but in passing mentions that the Huns possessed tents and also lived in wagons. No tents or wagons have been found in Hunnic archaeological contexts as they were evidently not buried with the deceased. Maenchen-Helfen believes that the Huns likely had "tents of felt and sheepskin": Priscus once mentions Attila's tent, and Jordanes reports that Attila lay in state in a silk tent. However, by the middle of the fifth century, Priscus mentions that the Huns owned permanent wooden houses, which Maenchen-Helfen believes were built by their Gothic subjects.

=== Bows and arrows ===
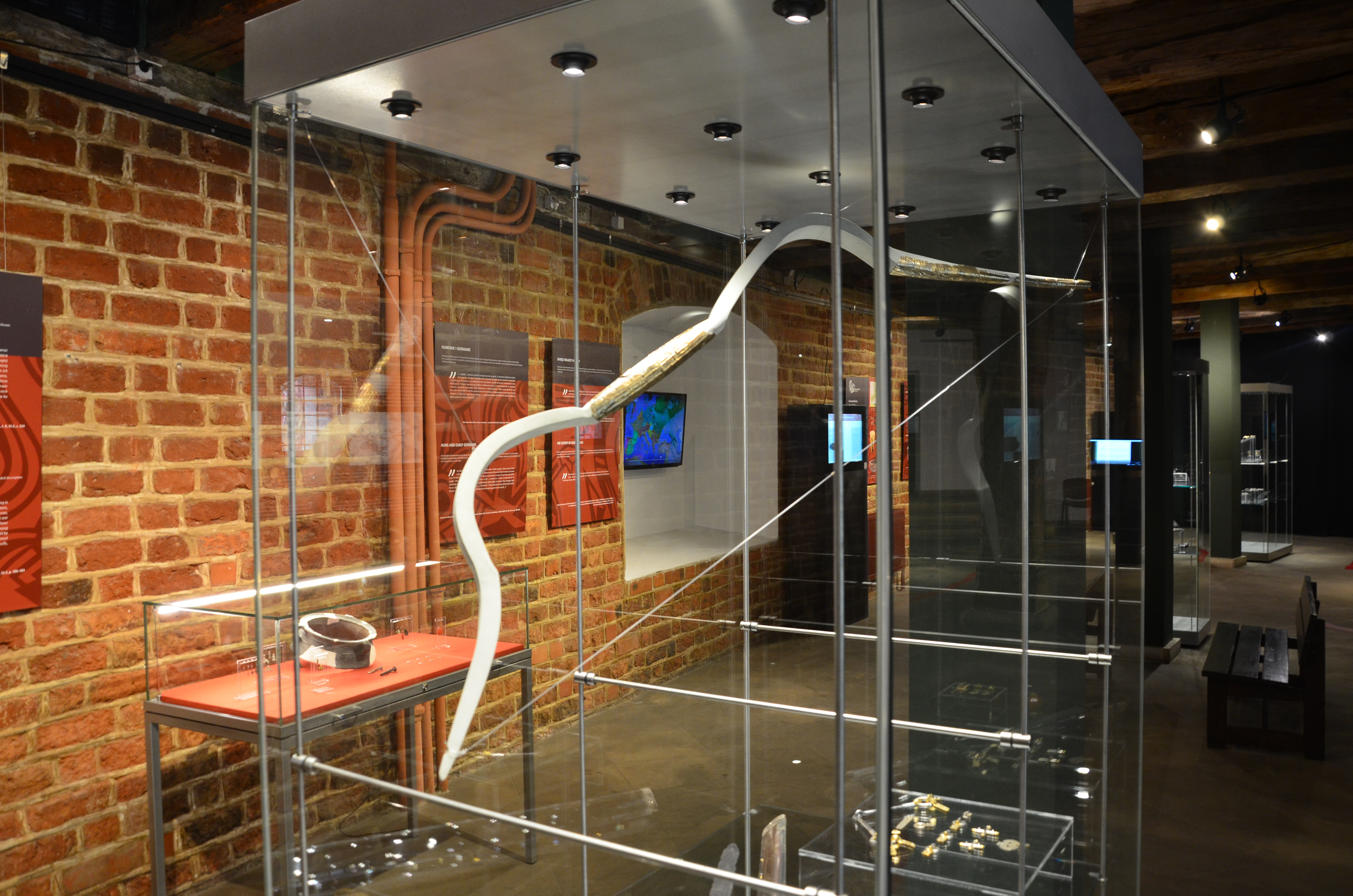
A ceremonial "Hun-style" reflex bow reconstructed from sheet gold found in a nomad burial at Jakuszowice, modern Poland

Ancient Roman sources stress the importance of the bow to the Huns, and it was the Huns' main weapon. The Huns used a composite or reflex bow of what is often called the "Hun-type", a style that had spread to all steppe nomads on the Eurasian steppe by the beginning of the Hun period. They measured between 120 and 150 centimeters. Examples are vary rare in the archaeological record, with finds in Europe clustering on the Pontic steppe and Middle Danube region. The rarity of surviving examples means that making precise statements about the advantages of this weapon is challenging. The bows were difficult to construct and probably objects of great value: They were made out of a flexible wood, strips of either antler or bone, and animal sinew. The bone used to strengthen the bow made it more durable but probably less powerful. The graves of figures identified as "princes" among the Huns have been found buried with golden, ceremonial bows in a wide area from the Rhine to the Dnieper. Bows were buried with the object placed across the chest of the deceased.

The bows shot larger arrows than the earlier "Scythian type" bows, with the appearance of iron, three-lobed arrowheads in the archaeological record taken as a sign of their spread. Ammianus, while recognizing the importance of Hunnic bows, does not appear well informed about them and claims, among other things, that the Huns only used bone-pointed arrows.

=== Riding gear ===
Riding equipment and harnesses are frequent finds from Hun-period burials. The Huns did not have spurs, and so used whips to drive their horses; the handles of such whips have been found in nomad graves. The Huns have customarily been considered the inventors of a wooden framed saddle. Maenchen-Helfen, for instance, argued that the surviving ornamentation from nomad graves dating to the Hun period showed that the saddles must have had a wooden frame. However, Oleksandr Symonenko argues more recent work has shown that the Huns still used an earlier style of saddle made of padding.

The Huns are also commonly credited with having introduced the stirrup to Europe. These appear to have been used by other Xiongnu successor groups in Asia from the 5th century CE onward. However, no stirrups have been found in Hunnic burials, nor is there any textual evidence of their use. Maenchen-Helfen also argues against the Huns having used stirrups, on the grounds that there is no evidence for their use after the end of the Hun empire even though they could easily have been copied by subject peoples. Without stirrups, the Huns would not have had the stability to fight in close combat on horseback and thus appear to have preferred fighting using bows and arrows. The lack of stirrups would have required special techniques for firing arrows from horseback.

=== Armor ===
Defensive equipment and chainmail are rare finds in Hunnic period graves. Ammianus makes no mention of any use of armor among the Huns. However, it is believed that the Huns made use of lamellar armor, a style of armor popular among steppe nomads during this time. Metal armor was probably a rarity. The Huns may have used a type of helmet known as the Spangenhelm, but Hunnic nobles may have worn helmets of various types.

=== Swords and other weapons ===
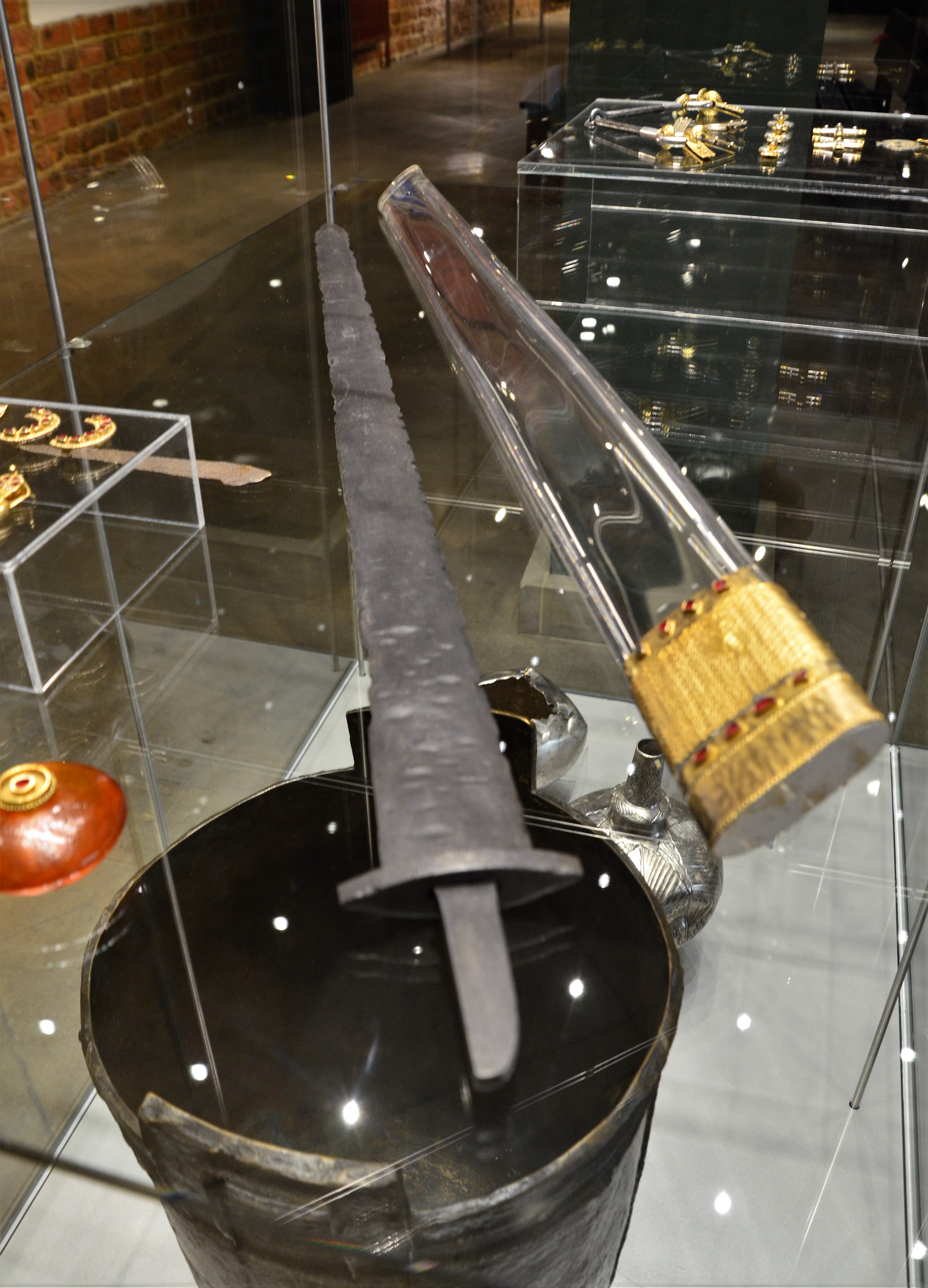
A spatha buried in a Hun-period grave with a nomadic background from Jakuszowice in modern Poland

Ammianus reports that the Huns used iron swords, and ceremonial swords, daggers, and decorated scabbards are frequent finds in Hun-period burials. Additionally, pearls are often found with swords; these decorative elements may have had a religious meaning. Beginning with Joachim Werner, archaeologists have argued that the Huns may have originated the fashion of decorating swords with cloisonné; however, Philip von Rummel argues these swords show strong Mediterranean influence, are rare in the Carpathian Basin from the Hun period, and may have been produced by Byzantine workshops.

Thompson is skeptical that the Huns could cast iron themselves, but Maenchen-Helfen argues that "[t]he idea that the Hun horsemen fought their way to the walls of Constantinople and to the Marne with bartered and captured swords is absurd." One characteristic sword used by the Huns and their subject peoples was the narrow-bladed long seax. Since the work of J. Werner in the 1950s, many scholars have believed that the Huns introduced this type of sword to Europe. In the earliest versions, these swords seem to have been shorter, stabbing weapons. The Huns, along with the Alans and the Eastern Germanic peoples, also used a type of sword known as an East Germanic or Asian spatha, a long, double-edged iron sword with an iron cross-guard. These swords would have been used to cut down enemies who had already been driven to flight by the Huns' volleys of arrows. Roman sources also mention lassos as weapons used at close range to immobilize opponents.

Some Huns or their subject peoples may also have carried heavy lances, as is attested for some Hunnic mercenaries in Roman sources.

== Legacy ==
=== In Christian hagiography ===
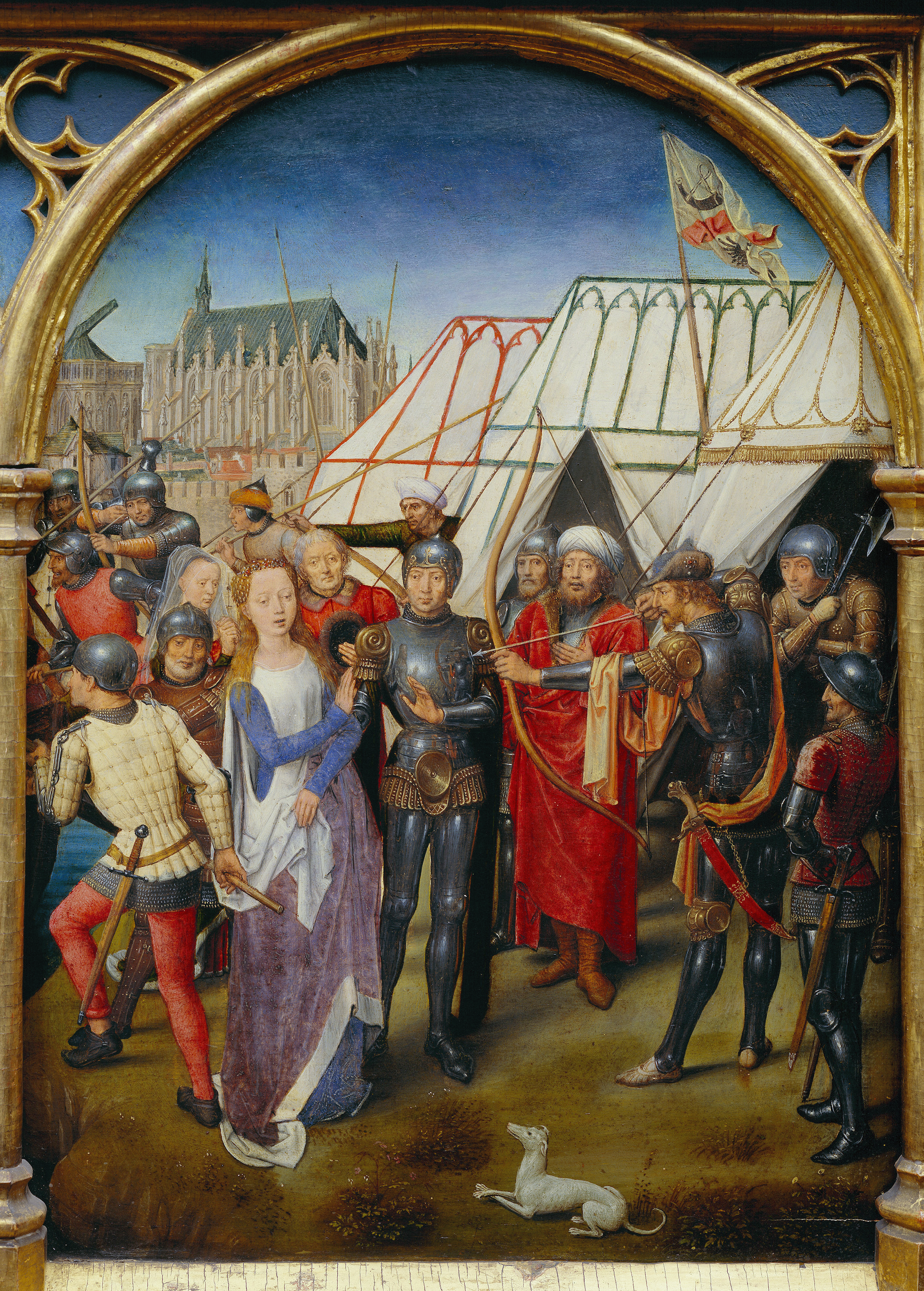
Martyrdom of Saint Ursula, by Hans Memling. The turbaned and armored figures represent Huns.

After the fall of the Hunnic Empire, various legends arose concerning the Huns. Among these are a number of Christian hagiographic legends in which the Huns play a role. In an anonymous medieval biography of Pope Leo I, Attila's march into Italy in 452 is stopped because, when he meets Leo outside Rome, the apostles Peter and Paul appear to him holding swords over his head and threatening to kill him unless he follows the pope's command to turn back. In other versions, Attila takes the pope hostage and is forced by the saints to release him. In the legend of Saint Ursula, Ursula and her 11,000 holy virgins arrive at Cologne on their way back from a pilgrimage just as the Huns, under an unnamed prince, are besieging the city. Ursula and her virgins are killed by the Huns with arrows after they refuse the Huns' sexual advances. Afterwards, the souls of the slaughtered virgins form a heavenly army that drives away the Huns and saves Cologne. Other cities with legends regarding the Huns and a saint include Orléans, Troyes, Dieuze, Metz, Modena, and Reims. In legends surrounding Saint Servatius of Tongeren dating to at least the eighth century, Servatius is said to have converted Attila and the Huns to Christianity, before they later became apostates and returned to their paganism.

=== In Germanic legend ===
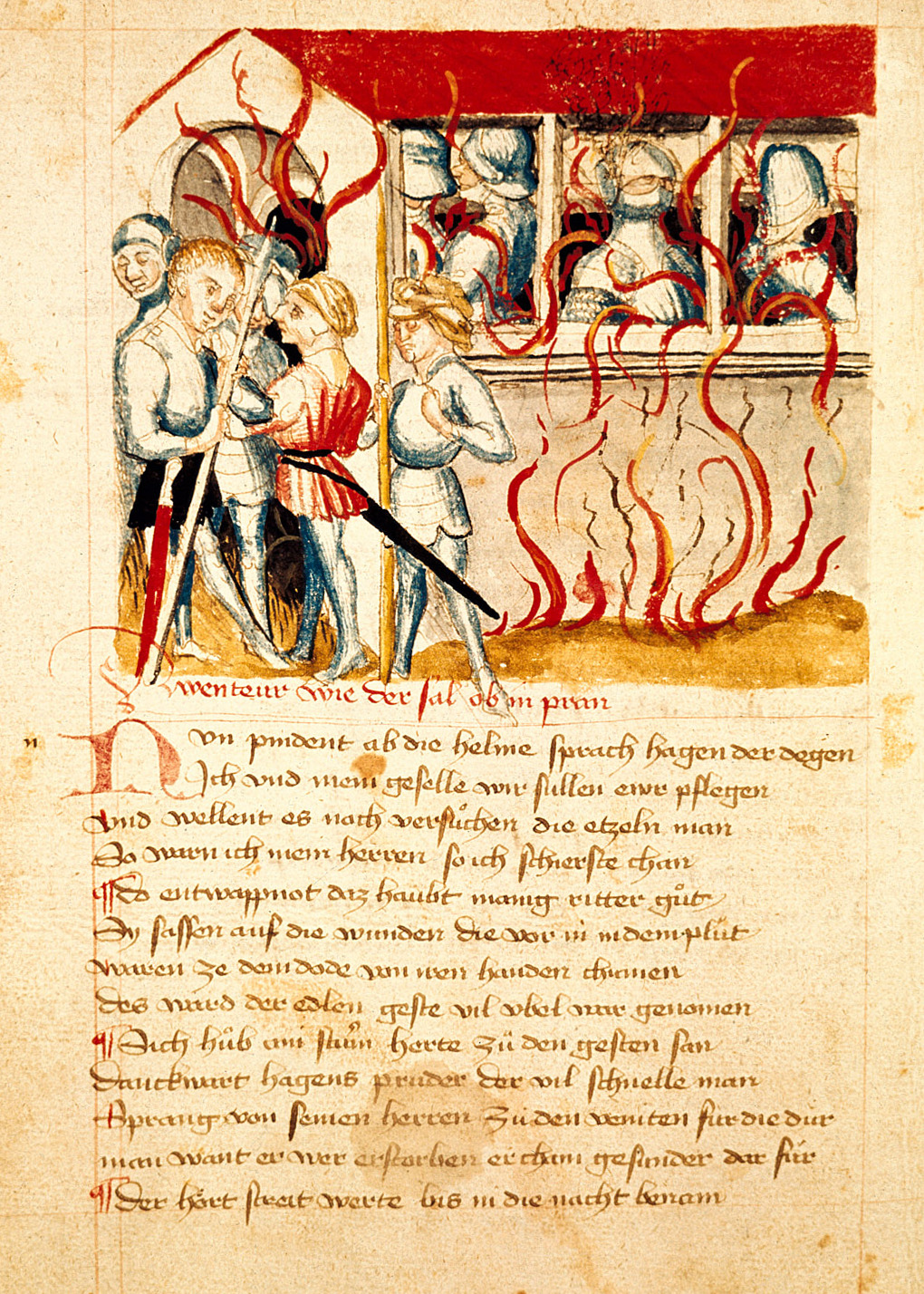
The Huns (outside) set fire to their own hall to kill the Burgundians. Illustration from the Hundeshagen Codex of the Nibelungenlied.

The Huns also play an important role in Germanic heroic legends, which frequently convey versions of events from the migration period and were originally transmitted orally. The Huns and Attila form central figures in the two most-widespread Germanic legendary cycles, that of the Nibelungs and of Dietrich von Bern (the historical Theoderic the Great). The Nibelung legend, particularly as recorded in the Old Norse Poetic Edda and Völsunga saga, as well as in the German Nibelungenlied, connects the Huns and Attila (and in the Norse tradition, Attila's death) to the destruction of the Burgundian kingdom on the Rhine in 437. In the legends about Dietrich von Bern, Attila and the Huns provide Dietrich with a refuge and support after he has been driven from his kingdom at Verona. Memories of the conflicts between the Goths and Huns in Eastern Europe appear to be maintained in the Old English poem Widsith as well as in the Old Norse poem "The Battle of the Goths and Huns", which is transmitted in the thirteenth-century Icelandic Hervarar Saga. Generally, the continental Germanic traditions paint a more positive picture of Attila and the Huns than the Scandinavian sources, where the Huns appear in a distinctly negative light.

In medieval German legend, the Huns were identified with the Hungarians, with their capital of Etzelburg (Attila-city) being identified with Esztergom or Buda. The Old Norse Thidrekssaga, however, which is based on North German sources, locates Hunaland in northern Germany, with a capital at Soest in Westphalia, while Attila is described as an usurper from Frisia, who conquered the Hun country after its king Milias died. In other Old Norse sources, the term Hun is sometimes applied indiscriminately to various people, particularly from south of Scandinavia. From the thirteenth-century onward, the Middle High German word for Hun, hiune, became a synonym for giant, and continued to be used in this meaning in the forms Hüne and Heune into the modern era. In this way, various prehistoric megalithic structures, particularly in Northern Germany, came to be identified as Hünengräber (Hun graves) or Hünenbetten (Hun beds).

=== Links to the Hungarians ===
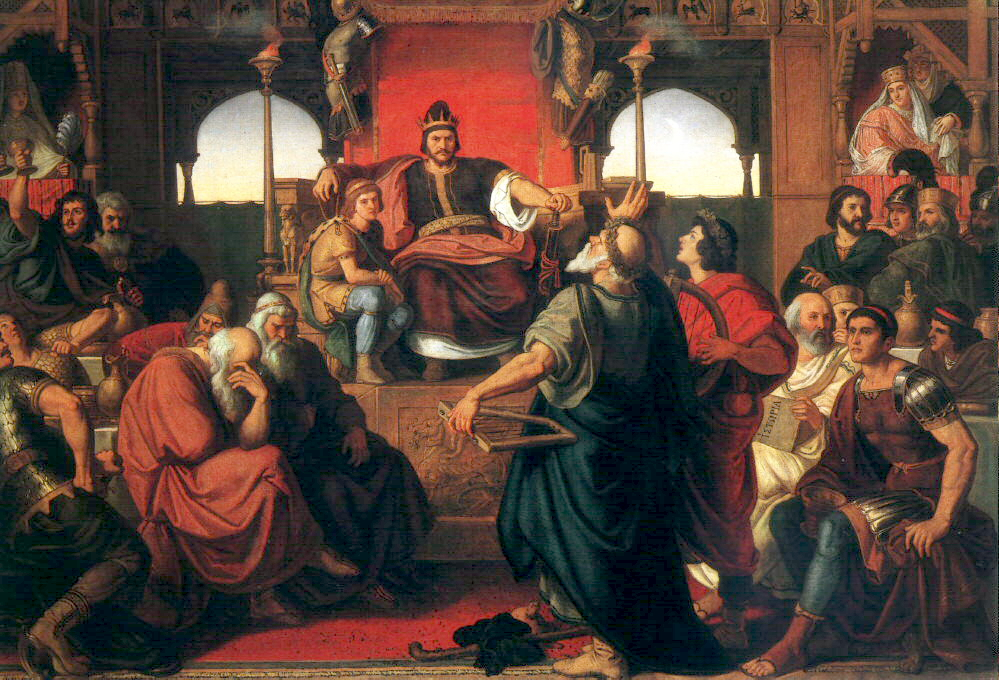
'Feast of Attila'. Hungarian romantic painting by Mór Than (1870).

Beginning in the High Middle Ages, Hungarian sources have claimed descent from or a close relationship between the Hungarians (Magyars) and the Huns. The claim appears to have first arisen in non-Hungarian sources and only gradually been taken up by the Hungarians themselves because of its negative connotations. The Anonymous Gesta Hungarorum (after 1200) is the first Hungarian source to mention that the line of Árpádian kings were descendants of Attila, but he makes no claim that the Hungarian and Hun peoples are related. The first Hungarian author to claim that Hun and Hungarian peoples were related was Simon of Kéza in his Gesta Hunnorum et Hungarorum (1282–1285). Simon claimed that the Huns and Hungarians were descended from two brothers, named Hunor and Magor. (Note: Szűcs argues that the name Hunor as a Hungarian ancestor is genuinely reflective of the Magyar oral legends, but that it actually derives from the name Onogur; Simon therefore merely used the resemblance of Hunor to Hun to support his theory.) These claims gave the Hungarians an ancient pedigree and served to legitimize their conquest of Pannonia.

Modern scholars largely dismiss these claims. Regarding the claimed Hunnish origins found in these chronicles, Jenő Szűcs writes:

The Hunnish origin of the Magyars is, of course, a fiction, just like the Trojan origin of the French or any of the other origo gentis theories fabricated at much the same time. The Magyars in fact originated from the Ugrian branch of the Finno-Ugrian peoples; in the course of their wanderings in the steppes of Eastern Europe they assimilated a variety of (especially Iranian and different Turkic) cultural and ethnic elements, but they had neither genetic nor historical links to the Huns.

Generally, the proof of the relationship between the Hungarian and the Finno-Ugric languages in the nineteenth century is taken to have scientifically disproven the Hunnic origins of the Hungarians. While the Magyars may not be descendants of the Huns, they were historically closely associated with Turkic peoples. Hyun Jin Kim supposes that the Hungarians might be linked to the Huns via the Bulgars and Avars, both of whom he holds to have had Hunnish elements.

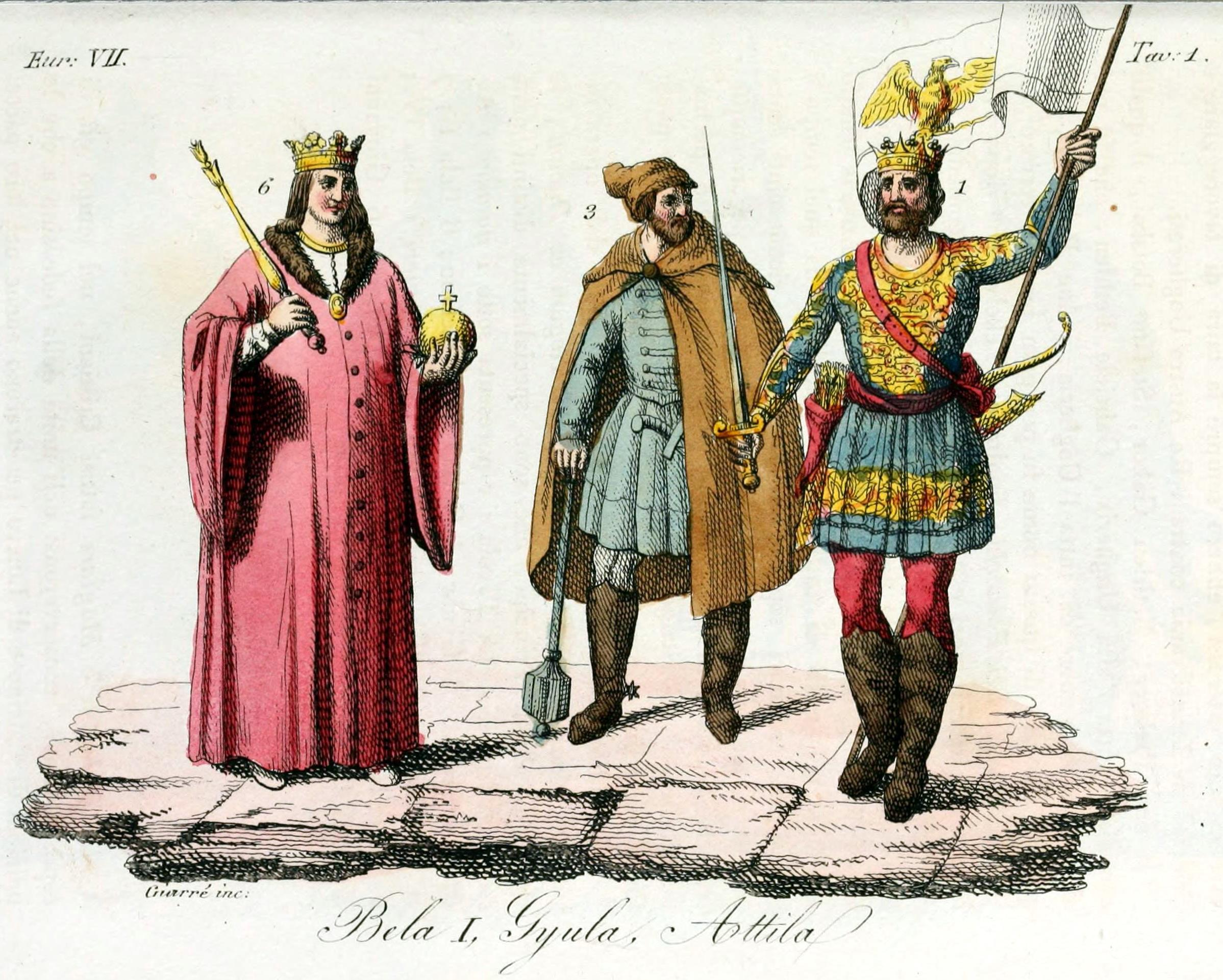
Attila (right) as a king of Hungary together with Gyula and Béla I, Illustration for Il costume antico e moderno by Giulio Ferrario (1831).

Another claim, also derived from Simon of Kéza, is that the Hungarian-speaking Székely people of Transylvania are descended from Huns, who fled to Transylvania after Attila's death, and remained there until the Hungarian conquest of Pannonia. While the origins of the Székely are unclear, modern historians and archaeologists do not consider the Székelys to be of Hunnic origin due to a lack of evidence. László Makkai notes as well that some archaeologists and historians believe Székelys were a Hungarian tribe or an Onogur-Bulgar tribe drawn into the Carpathian Basin at the end of the 7th century by the Avars (who were identified with the Huns by contemporary Europeans). Unlike in the legend, the Székely were resettled in Transylvania from Western Hungary in the eleventh century. Their language similarly shows no evidence of a change from any non-Hungarian language to Hungarian, as one would expect if they were Huns.

While the notion that the Hungarians are descended from the Huns has been rejected by mainstream scholarship, the idea has continued to exert a relevant influence on Hungarian nationalism and national identity. A majority of the Hungarian aristocracy continued to ascribe to the Hunnic view into the early twentieth century. The Fascist Arrow Cross Party similarly referred to Hungary as Hunnia in its propaganda. The supposed Hunnic origins of the Hungarians also played a large role in the modern radical right-wing party Jobbik's ideology of Pan-Turanism. Legends concerning the Hunnic origins of the Székely minority in Romania, meanwhile, continue to play a large role in that group's ethnic identity. Members of the Hungarian right wing, previously with the support of the government of former prime minister Viktor Orbán and academic institutions such as the Institute of Hungarian Research (Magyarságkutató Intézet, MKI), continue to promote Hungarian descent from the Huns.

=== Modern associations with savagery ===
Modern culture generally associates the Huns with extreme cruelty and barbarism. During the First World War, Allied propaganda often called the Germans "Huns" in order to paint the Germans as savage barbarians; this usage continued to a limited extent during the Second World War as well.

In Nazi propaganda, historical references to the Huns were utilized to characterize Slavic peoples and the Soviet Union as a primitive "Asiatic" threat to European civilization. This narrative was most prominently detailed in the 1942 SS-Hauptamt brochure Der Untermensch, which depicted the populations of the Eastern Front as biological and spiritual successors to the nomadic "hordes" of Attila. By framing the war as a defense against a "new Hunnic storm," the Nazi regime sought to provide a historical and racial justification for the war of annihilation (Vernichtungskrieg) and the implementation of Generalplan Ost.

== See also ==
- Severians
- Amal dynasty
- Huna people
- List of Huns
- List of rulers of the Huns
- Nomadic empire
