= Hunnic raid of 395 =

395 AD invasion by the Huns

Date	395 AD
Location	near Ctesiphon, Sasanian Empire
Result	Sasanian victory

Belligerents
Hunnic Empire	Sasanian Empire

Commanders and leaders
Basiq; Kursich	Bahram IV

The Hunnic raid of 395 was an invasion by the Huns into Roman and Sasanian provinces.

== Background ==
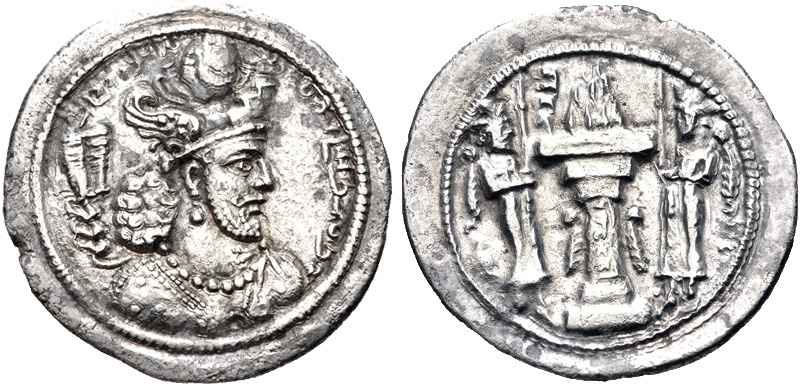
Bahram IV of the Sasanian Empire defeated the Huns who had broken through the Roman borders, and freed 18,000 Roman prisoners, which improved Roman-Persian relations

In 395 the Huns, led by commanders Basiq and Kursich, crossed the Don and turning southeast crossed the Caucasus. Initially, the Huns invaded the Roman regions of Sophene, Armenia, Mesopotamia, and Syria, capturing and enslaving Roman subjects. The Huns then besieged the Roman fortress of Ziatha, burning it and killing and enslaving its inhabitants. The two contingents then proceeded into Persia proper.

== Invasion ==
Basiq and Kursich led two detachments down the Euphrates, threatening the capital Ctesiphon. Upon hearing that the Sasanian army was marching against them, the Huns retreated. However, one group was overtaken, and some were killed. The Sasanians took nearly all of the booty, and freed 18,000 captives. The other group of Huns successfully retreated through the Derbent Pass.

== Aftermath ==
Years later, the Sasanian Emperor Yazdegerd I returned the Roman prisoners taken by the Huns.

== Sources ==
- Greatrex, G.; Greatrex, M. (1999). "The Hunnic Invasion of the East of 395 and the Fortress of Ziatha". Byzantion. 69 (1). Peeters Publishers: 65–75. JSTOR 44172154.
- Maenchen-Helfen, Otto J. (1973). Knight, Max (ed.). The World of the Huns Studies in Their History and Culture. University of California Press. p. 54. ISBN 9780520357204.
- Schottky, Martin (2012). "Huns". Encyclopaedia Iranica.
- Sinor, Denis (1990). "The Hun Period". The Cambridge history of early Inner Asia (1. ed.). Cambridge [u.a.]: Cambridge University Press. pp. 177, 183–184, 203. ISBN 9780521243049.
