= Kursich =

Hun general

- Born: 4th century
- Died: After 395 AD

Kursich (fl. 395) was a Hun general and royal family member. He led a Hunnish army in the Hunnic invasion of Persia in 395 AD.

== Etymology ==
Omeljan Pritsak derived Kursich's name from a proposed Altaic root *kür or *kür+ä, meaning "brave, noble, powerful, universal," together with a suffix *-siġ, meaning "like, similar to". Otto Maenchen-Helfen considered the name to be a hybrid of Turkic and another language. He took the ending -ich to be a Turkic diminutive suffix -iq, while he compared kurs to the name Churs, attested as the name of an Armenian prince, Ossetian xors and the Ias name Horz. Gerhard Doerfer takes the name for Hunnish but rejects attempts to etymologize it. Historian Hyun Jin Kim argued that the name was Turkic.

== Biography ==
The Huns started to seriously threaten the Eastern Roman Empire in 395, crossing over the Caucasus mountains in the summer of that year. The following winter, another Hunnic force pillaged Thrace and threatened Dalmatia. The Huns then invaded Armenia, Persia and the Asian Roman provinces. Kursich and another commander, Basich, led two armies down the Euphrates, up to threatening the Sassanid Persian capital of Ctesiphon. One army was defeated by the Persians, while the other successfully retreated by Derbent Pass.

Priscus recorded that Kursich later came to the city of Rome to make an alliance. Maenchen-Helfen suggested that he and Basich came to Rome in 404 or 407, as mercenaries.

== Works cited ==
- Doerfer, Gerhard (1973). "Zur Sprache der Hunnen". Central Asiatic Journal. 17 (1): 1–50. JSTOR 41927011.
- Kim, Hyun Jin (2015). The Huns. Taylor & Francis. ISBN 9781317340904.
- Maenchen-Helfen, Otto J. (1973). The World of the Huns: Studies in Their History and Culture. University of California Press. ISBN 9780520015968.
- Pritsak, Omeljan (1982). "The Hunnic Language of the Attila Clan". Harvard Ukrainian Studies. 4 (4): 428–476. ISSN 0363-5570. JSTOR 41036005.
