= Basich =

Hun general

- Born: 4th century
- Died: After 395 AD

Basich or Basikh (Greek: Βασίχ, fl. 395) was a Hun military commander who co-led an invasion of Persia in 395 AD together with Kursich.

== Etymology ==
Otto Maenchen-Helfen took the ending -ich for the Turkic diminutive -iq; he proposed that Basich came from basiq, meaning "little captain". Omeljan Pritsak instead understood there to be a suffix -siġ, meaning "like something"; he derived Basich from Turkic *bars-siġ with loss of the -r- and degemination, giving a meaning "feline-like". Gerhard Doerfer takes the name as having a Hunnish origin, but has criticized both Turkic explanations as relying on unproductive suffixes that are not easily proven to have existed.

== Biography ==
The sources identify Basich and Kursich as "royal Huns". They are the first Huns definitively named in ancient sources. He was probably the chieftain of a Hunnish tribe, though it is not excluded that he and Kursich were two kings ruling in a dual-monarchy, similar to that of the Huns' predecessors, the Xiongnu.

=== Invasion of Persia ===
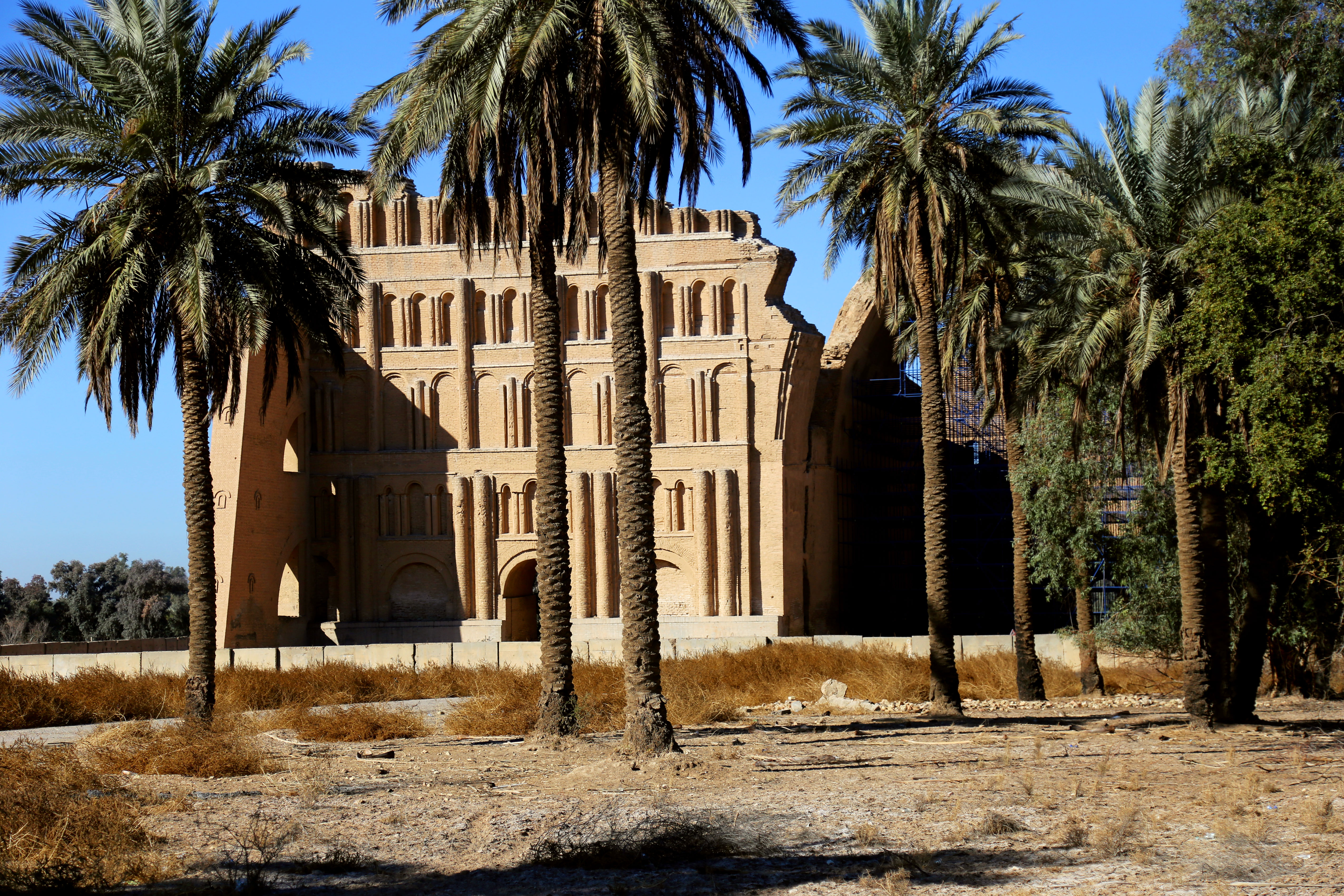
Basich's invasion of Persia threatened the capital of Ctesiphon

In 395 the Huns had started their first large-scale attacks on the Romans and, in the summer of that year, they crossed over the Caucasus Mountains. In the winter of 395, another Hunnic invasion force crossed the frozen Danube, pillaging Thrace and approaching Dalmatia. Meanwhile, the forces in Asia invaded Armenia, Persia, and the Roman provinces in Asia.

One group crossed the Euphrates, but was defeated by a Roman army. The Hun commanders Basich and Kursich led two other armies down the Euphrates and threatened the Persian capital of Ctesiphon. One of these armies was defeated by the Persians, while the other successfully retreated by Derbent Pass.

Priscus records that Basich, together with Kursich (the commander of the other army that invaded Persia) came to Rome to make an alliance. According to Otto Maenchen-Helfen, they may have come to Rome in 404 or 407 as mercenaries.
