= Attila (miniseries) =

2001 American television miniseries

- Also known as: Attila the Hun
- Written by: Robert Cochran
- Directed by: Dick Lowry
- Starring: Gerard Butler; Powers Boothe; Simmone Mackinnon; Reg Rogers; Tim Curry; Alice Krige
- Music by: Nick Glennie-Smith
- Countries of origin: United States; Lithuania
- Original language: English

Production
- Executive producers: Caldecot Chubb; Sean Daniel; James Jacks
- Producers: Paul Lichtman; Robertas Urbonas
- Cinematography: Steven Fierberg
- Editor: Tod Feuerman
- Running time: 177 minutes
- Production companies: Alphaville Films; Attila Productions; Michael R. Joyce Productions

Original release
- Network: USA Network
- Release: January 30 – January 31, 2001

Attila (also known as Attila the Hun in the UK) is a 2001 American historical television miniseries set during the Migration Period in Europe.

== Synopsis ==
The narrative of the miniseries primarily follows Attila the Hun (reigned 434–453) during his rise to power, violent unification of the Hunnic tribes, and subsequent campaigns, first against the Eastern Roman Empire, and later against the Visigoths and the Western Roman Empire.

A parallel narrative follows Roman general Flavius Aetius, Attila's primary antagonist, who works vigorously to keep the Western Roman Empire intact despite factional politics, a weak emperor, and a steady stream of barbarian invasions.

== Cast ==
- Gerard Butler as Attila
  - Rollo Weeks as Young Attila
- Powers Boothe as Flavius Aetius
- Simmone Jade Mackinnon as N'Kara / Ildico
- Reg Rogers as Valentinian III
- Alice Krige as Placidia
- Pauline Lynch as Galen
- Steven Berkoff as Rua
- Andrew Pleavin as Orestes
- Tommy Flanagan as Bleda
- Kirsty Mitchell as Honoria
- Jonathan Hyde as Flavius Felix
- Tim Curry as Theodosius II
- Janet Henfrey as Pulcheria
- Liam Cunningham as Theodoric I
- Richard Lumsden as Petronius
- Mark Letheren as Thorismund
- Jolyon Baker as Mundzuk
- David Bailie as The Shaman
- Isla Fisher as Cerca

== Viewership ==
Attila would be watched on the USA Network by an average of 7 million viewers.

== Home media ==
The miniseries was released on DVD November 5, 2002 by Universal.

== See also ==
- List of historical drama films
- List of films set in ancient Rome
