= Oebarsius =

Hun nobleman

Oebarsius or Aybars (died after 448) was a Hun nobleman, brother of Mundzuk and uncle of Bleda and Attila.

He was held in great honor, and sat next to Attila at royal banquets. Oebarsius was probably never a king, and had no dominion of his own. He was still alive in 448.

Pritsak considered that the name is a transcription of Turkic Oibars, meaning "yellow leopard" (hence "lion"). According to Hyun Jin Kim, his name is connected to Turkic Aybars, meaning "leopard of the moon", an ongon in the Turkic mythology. There are other opinions about the affinity of his name with Oebasus, the Latin form of an Iranian name. His name, possibly as many other recorded by Priscus, might have been Grecisized.
