= Attila (1954 film) =

- West Germany Poster 1955
- Directed by: Pietro Francisci
- Written by: Ennio De Concini; Richard C. Sarafian; Primo Zeglio; Frank Gervasi
- Produced by: Dino De Laurentiis; Carlo Ponti
- Starring: Anthony Quinn; Sophia Loren; Henri Vidal; Irene Papas
- Cinematography: Aldo Tonti (1.33:1)
- Edited by: Leo Catozzo
- Music by: Enzo Masetti
- Distributed by: Lux Film - Italy / France, Attila Associates - USA (later to become Embassy Pictures)
- Release date: December 1954 (Italy)
- Running time: 77 minutes (25 fps) Europe; 80 minutes (24 fps) U.S.
- Countries: Italy; France
- Language: Italian
- Budget: 415,000,000 ITL ($665,000)
- Box office: $2 million (US rentals)

Attila (Italian: Attila, il flagello di Dio; French: Attila fléau de Dieu) is a 1954 historical drama, directed by Pietro Francisci and produced by Dino De Laurentiis and Carlo Ponti for Lux Film. Based on the life of Attila the Hun, it stars Anthony Quinn as Attila and Sophia Loren as Honoria, with French leading man Henri Vidal as the Hun's antagonist, Flavius Aetius. Irene Papas, in the second of three contract pictures for Lux Film, plays one of Attila's wives, Grune. Ettore Manni, Christian Marquand, and Claude Laydu are among the supporting cast of mostly French and Italian actors. American actor Scott Marlowe made his screen debut in the film. Along with The Pride and the Passion and Houseboat, it was one of Loren's biggest box-office successes during the 1950s.

Filmed immediately following the breakthrough Italo-American co-production, Ulysses (Lux Film / Ponti-DeLaurentiis / Paramount Pictures, 1954), Attila, Scourge of God represented an independent attempt by the same Italian producers to make a film with an American lead actor in hopes of licensing it to an American studio for distribution on more lucrative terms. It failed to secure this goal for a variety of reasons unforeseen at the outset. However, three and a half years later (retitled Attila) it proved to be the vehicle which launched the career of Joseph E. Levine as a producer and distributor of international films, many of them Italian in origin. While never to be a financially or critically acclaimed motion picture, Attila ultimately achieved the status of a significant product in the evolution of world film markets.

== Plot ==
The story is set during 450-452 A.D. The Huns, a horde of barbarians from the distant plains of Asia, move toward the rich western lands of Germania, led by a savage chief, Attila.

Flavius Aetius, a Roman general, is the only person who knows Attila since he was a hostage with the Huns for years. Aetius and his companion Priscus carry a message from the Roman emperor Valentinian III to the Hun's king Ruas. After reaching their palace, Aetius learns that the king has died, and that two brothers Bleda and Attila are now ruling the Hun kingdom. Bleda favours peace and tolerance, but Attila is at odds with him, and tensions develop. Yet Aetius knows to make an alliance between the Western Roman Empire and the Huns.

Aetius returns to the Imperial court at Ravenna, where the childish emperor Valentinian III is busy with Roman parties in his palace and enjoying himself, while ignoring the fact that the Empire is beginning to fall apart. Because of this, his mother Galla Placidia is de facto ruling the Empire. Honoria, daughter of Galla Placidia and sister of Valentinian, hopes to get rid of them, but needs help to do so. She asks Aetius to join her in a coup d'état, but he has vowed an oath to serve the Empire and refuses, even if he's arrested and stripped of his military rank by Valentinian and Galla Placidia due to his alliance to the Huns.

Attila and Bleda battle, Attila wins by ordering his bodyguard to fire arrows at Bleda and his bodyguard during the hunt, and declares himself the sole leader of the Huns, riling them to support his aspirations of conquering the Roman Empire.

Flavius Aetius returns to Ravenna, and finds Emperior Valentinian enraged by imagined attempts against his rule. Galla Placidia realizes that the Empire is now on the edge of destruction and gives Aetius full military powers in an effort to protect her son. As Roman legions march to block Attila's path, Honoria slips away from the Imperial court and visits the Hun in his camp.

The battle is eventually joined with a frontal attack on the Roman encampment by Hunnic cavalry. This first move is a deception, designed to draw the legions out of their fortified position. Aetius decides to pursue the retreating Huns, anyway. His cavalry charges and his foot soldiers follow them into the fray. After a clash of arms on the open plains, the fighting moves into the Hun camp. Here Honoria is found hiding in a nomad cart and killed. But Aetius is soon killed by an arrow through the neck and the Romans lose their will to fight. They flee the field and the Huns follow to burn their encampment. As night falls, Attila takes his young son, Bleda, to view the carnage strewn battlefield. There, a badly wounded Roman archer manages to fire a last shot. The arrow misses Attila, but kills Bleda. This emotionally traumatizes the Hun. He appears to lose his passion for conquest and plunder.

On the way toward Rome, a sullen Attila and his horde come upon a procession of Christians led by Pope Leo I. Bewildered by the assembly he faces, Attila speaks alone with the Pope in the middle of a stream that separates his army from the religious gathering. Leo calmly tells Attila "You can kill everybody...old people, women, children...", and Attila suddenly hears the disembodied words of his murdered brother Bleda. "Innocent blood won't be washed away. It will come back to haunt you." With this warning in mind, Attila suddenly decides to turn back towards the Alps, leaving Rome unscathed.

== Cast ==
- Anthony Quinn as Attila
- Sophia Loren as Honoria
- Henri Vidal as Aetius
- Irene Papas as Grune
- Ettore Manni as Bleda
- Christian Marquand as Tribe chieftain
- Claude Laydu as Valentinian III
- Colette Régis as Galla Placidia
- Guido Celano as Tribe Chieftain
- Marco Guglielmi as Kadis
- Eduardo Ciannelli as Onegesius, counsellor to Attila
- Carlo Hintermann as Tribe Chieftain
- Mimmo Palmara as Wrestler
- Mario Feliciani as Hippolytus
- Georges Bréhat as Priscus
- Aldo Pini as Dominicus

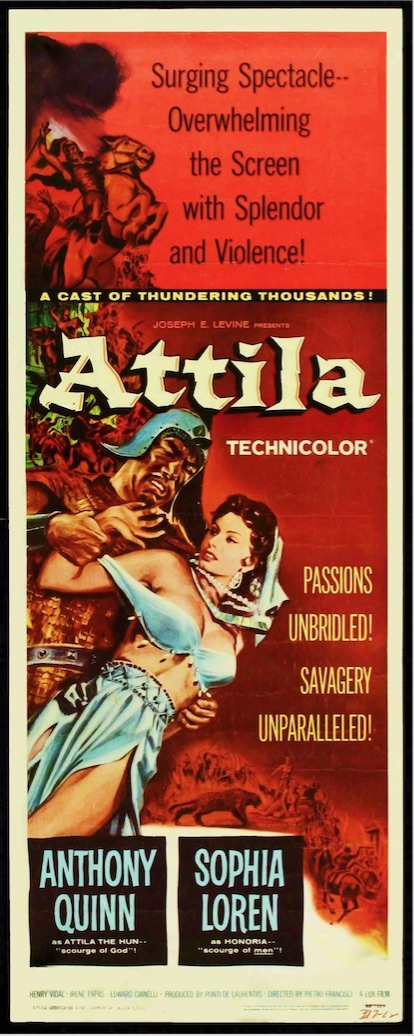
Poster for ATTILA, US release, 1958.

== US release (1958): The dawn of saturation booking ==
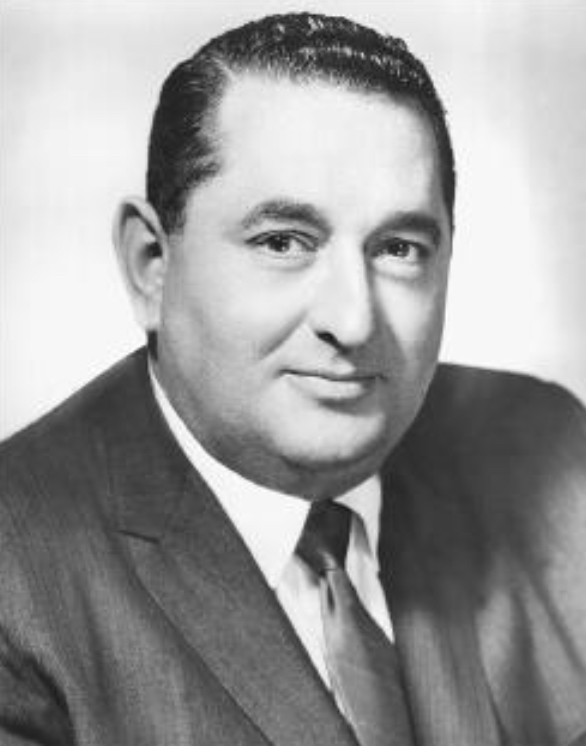
Joseph E. Levine, Embassy Pictures, 1958

Attila's release was a signal moment in US film distribution. It established an exhibition pattern which came to be known as "saturation booking". Joseph E. Levine, a states-rights distributor/exhibitor based in Boston, quickly moved some 90 prints through regional distribution hubs, managing to assemble ad hoc arrays of mostly low-end theaters, where he could book short period playdates with favorable box-office terms. This dense concentration of venues allowed for the cost effective use of local TV and radio spots, and he spent far more than most would have considered prudent. The film opened on April 23, 1958, in Levine's native New England and eventually played more than 300 theatres there, before openings (in conjunction with other distribution/exhibition states-righters) in Pittsburgh, Los Angeles, Washington D.C., Milwaukee, New York and Philadelphia, during the month of May. Following this pattern, Levine's picture was able to generate over $2 million in combined US box-office rentals with only a ten-day-per-screen exhibition average. The success of Attila proved that an exploitable picture with heavy TV-advertising, and a dense concentration of theaters, could break through traditional road blocks to success for an independent release.

Levine licensed the US theatrical, non-theatrical, and television exhibition rights to Attila for a 10-year term (through March 1968) for $90,000, plus the cost of supplied film and sound mastering elements from the Italian producers, Lux Film / Ponti-DeLaurentiis. He also remade the picture's main-title and head-credits in English, typesetting them (in a 1.66:1 title-safe aspect-ratio) over a simple weaved cloth background. In all, about $110,000 was expended to get the film ready for printing. In the course of its initial release, Levine also spent $590,000 on print and newspaper advertising, and $350,000 on radio and TV spots, enabling the picture to earn back over $2 million in US rentals. It was re-released in 1961 on a double-bill with Steve Reeves' Hercules, then sold into TV-syndication.

By contract, all US 35 mm and 16 mm, prints and masters, were collected and disposed of in 1968. The film was then out of US distribution for decades. The picture's 1958 US copyright was renewed in 1986, by a Parisian law firm believed to be acting on behalf of Carlo Ponti and the French StudioCanal film library. An Italian-language version (with English sub-titles) was finally issued to US home video in 2008 as part of a 4-film collection from Lionsgate which contained some of Sophia Loren's earlier works. Since the movie's initial release, English-language versions have featured a track dubbed by Anthony Quinn. This track was also used on Joe Levine's American distribution prints and contains many lines in English which do not match the dialogue spoken in Italian.

Warner Bros. was so impressed with the exhibition showmanship and business acumen that Joe Levine had brought to Attila, they paid him a $300,000 advance to secure the distribution-rights for his pending release of Pietro Francisci's muscleman epic, Hercules. The results Levine had achieved with Attila were then intensified (utilizing Warner Bros' nationwide network of print exchanges) to realize the far greater take of $4.7 million in North American rentals when that film was released to great fanfare with over 600 prints the following summer. 175 of these played simultaneously in the Greater New York City area, at a time when major studio releases often opened, nationally, with such a number. The dubbed Italian sword-and-sandal film, which was produced for about a half-million dollars (Levine purchased North American rights for approximately a third of this figure), became the 4th highest-grossing US release of 1959, easily surpassing all previous box office takes for a foreign-film in the United States. Financially, it was widely viewed as a "Joe Levine presents" promotion-fueled blockbuster.

== Reception ==
On Rotten Tomatoes, the film holds a rating of 50% from 10 reviews.

== See also ==
- List of historical drama films
- List of films set in ancient Rome
- Sign of the Pagan
