= Octar =

Chieftain of the Huns (co-rulership)
- Reign: 420–430
- Predecessor: Charaton
- Successor: Rugila
- Born: Late 4th century or early 5th century
- Died: 430; Rhineland
- Father: Uldin

Octar or Ouptaros was a Hunnic ruler. He ruled in dual kingship with his brother Rugila, possibly with a geographical division, ruling the Western Huns while his brother ruled the Eastern Huns.

== Etymology ==
The name is recorded in two variants, Greek Ούπταρος (Ouptaros), and Latin Octar. The change from -ct- to -pt- is characteristic of Balkan Latin. Otto J. Maenchen-Helfen considered the name to be of unknown origin. Omeljan Pritsak derived the name from Turko-Mongolic word *öktem (strong, brave, imperious; proud, boastful; pride) and verb ökte- / oktä- (to encourage). He argued that the deverbal Turkic-Mongolian suffix m was replaced in Turkic by z while in Mongolian by ri. The reconstructed form is appellative *öktä-r.

== History ==
Octar ruled along with his brother Rugila as reported by Jordanes in his Getica: "...Mundzucus, whose brothers were Octar and Ruas, who were supposed to have been kings before Attila, although not altogether of the same [territories] as he". Their brother Mundzuk was the father of Attila, but he was not a supreme ruler of the Huns. According to Priscus their fourth brother Oebarsius was still alive in 448 AD. Their ancestors and relation with previous rulers Uldin and Charaton are unknown.

He ruled with his brother in dual kingship, possibly a geographical division where Rugila ruled over Eastern Huns while Octar over Western Huns, possibly like Attila and Bleda.

According to Socrates of Constantinople, Octar, identified with Ouptaros, died in 430 near the Rhine, "[f]or the king of the Huns, Uptaros by name, having burst asunder in the night from surfeit, the Burgundians attacked that [the Huns of Uptaros] people then without a leader; and although few in numbers and their opponents many, they obtained victory".

== Sources ==
- Maenchen-Helfen, Otto J. (1973). The World of the Huns: Studies in Their History and Culture. University of California Press. ISBN 9780520015968.
- Pritsak, Omeljan (1982). The Hunnic Language of the Attila Clan (PDF). Vol. IV. Cambridge, Massachusetts: Harvard Ukrainian Research Institute. ISSN 0363-5570. Archived from the original (PDF) on 2016-12-13.

Preceded by Charaton	Hunnic rulers Joint rule with Rugila ? – 430	Succeeded by Rugila
