= Boisci =

Late antique people in Eastern Europe

The Boisci (Ancient Greek: Βοΐσκοι; Latin: Boisci) were a people of Late Antiquity recorded only in connection with the Huns, in the works of the 5th-century historian Priscus and the 6th-century historian Jordanes. Their name is usually taken to be Celtic and connected with that of the Boii, which would make the Boisci, together with the neighbouring Itimari, the easternmost Celtic peoples attested in Europe, although only by name. The two sources place them differently, near the Danube or near the Sea of Azov, and their actual ethnicity and homeland are uncertain.

== Name ==
The Boisci are named only twice, both times among groups caught up with the Huns. The 5th-century historian Priscus lists them, with the Amilzuri, Itimari and Tounsoures, among peoples living near the Danube who went over to the Romans in the reign of the Hunnic king Rua. The 6th-century historian Jordanes names them, in the form Boisci, among the Alpidzuri, Alcildzuri, Itimari and Tuncarsi who dwelt on the bank of Scythia and were overrun when the Huns swept across the Maeotic marshes.

The name carries the suffix -isk-, which it shares with several ethnonyms of the region long treated as Celtic, among them the Eravisci, the Scordisci and the Taurisci. Its Celtic character, accepted in most modern scholarship, rests above all on a connection with the name of the Boii. Otto Maenchen-Helfen read Boisci as 'the little Boii', a formation with a diminutive suffix. The -isk- suffix has alternatively been understood as marking 'those belonging to the Boii'.

The etymology of the base Boi- itself is unsettled. Xavier Delamarre records several competing derivations and favours none. The name has been connected with a root meaning 'to strike', giving a sense 'striker'. Pierre-Yves Lambert derives it from an earlier bogios, a derivation Delamarre regards as improbable on chronological grounds, others from Proto-Indo-European *bʰeiH- ('to strike'), compared with the runic baijaz ('warrior'). Alexander Falileyev glosses the ethnonym as 'the warrior'. A second reading derives it from *bʰei- ('to fear'), yielding a sense 'the fearsome'. A third connects it with the word for cattle (*gʷou- > *bowios) in the sense 'cattle-owner', which Delamarre judges doubtful because of the loss of the internal glide. A fourth, proposed by Alfred Bammesberger, derives the name from *gʷ(e)iH- ('to live'), giving a sense 'lively, active'.

== Geography ==
The two sources place the Boisci in different regions. In Priscus the group lives near the Danube, whereas in Jordanes it is set on the edge of Scythia by the Maeotis (modern Sea of Azov). The discrepancy need not be decisive, since the 'vicinity' of a river in ancient geographical writing could cover a considerable distance. Nicopolis ad Istrum, for instance, lay about 100 km from the Danube. The placement by the Sea of Azov has been accepted, with reservations, by several Russian and Ukrainian scholars.

A Celtic presence around the Maeotis has sometimes been argued from a Byzantine list of bishoprics that calls the region 'Galatia', but there are no actual linguistic traces of Celtic there, and the Celticity of the names of southern Ukraine has been judged non-existent.

== Ethnic identity ==
Both Priscus and Jordanes set the Boisci in the orbit of the Huns. Jordanes presents them, with their neighbours, as peoples overrun by the Huns rather than as Huns themselves, swept up when the invaders crossed the Maeotic marshes. Priscus records that, in the reign of Rua, the Boisci and the other tribes near the Danube fled to take service on the Roman side.

The ethnic and linguistic character of this cluster of peoples has been disputed. Besides the Celtic interpretation of the names Boisci and Itimari, the group has often been regarded as ethnically Hunnic and linguistically Turkic, while C. D. Gordon connected the neighbouring Amilzuri with a complex of probably Germanic tribes.

Maenchen-Helfen supposed that a confederacy of Hunnic, Celtic and other peoples existed in southern Russia before the arrival of the Huns of Attila. According to Alexander Falileyev, the Boisci and the Itimari represent the easternmost Celtic peoples attested in Europe, with the essential qualification that this holds only of their names.
