= Itimari =

Late antique people in Eastern Europe

The Itimari (Ancient Greek: Ἰτίμαροι; Latin: Itimari) were a people of Late Antiquity, recorded only in connection with the Huns, in the works of the 5th-century historian Priscus and the 6th-century historian Jordanes. They appear in both sources alongside the Boisci. The name Itimari is obscure, but has been interpreted as a Celtic compound, which would make the Itimari and the Boisci the easternmost Celtic peoples attested in Europe, although only by name. The two sources place them differently, near the Danube or near the Sea of Azov, and their ethnicity and homeland are uncertain.

== Name ==
The Itimari are named only twice, both times among groups caught up with the Huns. The 5th-century historian Priscus lists them, with the Amilzuri, Tounsoures and the Boisci, among peoples living near the Danube who went over to the Romans in the reign of the Hunnic king Rua. The 6th-century historian Jordanes names them, in the form Itimari, among the Alpidzuri, Alcildzuri, Tuncarsi and Boisci who dwelt on the bank of Scythia and were overrun when the Huns swept across the Maeotic marshes.

Alexander Falileyev has interpreted Itimari as a Celtic compound. Its second element is identified with Gaulish *māro- ('big'; cf. Old Irish már, mór), attached to a first element *itu-, from the Proto-Indo-European root *peiH- ('to swell'), with Celtic loss of initial *p-. The sense of the name depends on the meaning taken by this element. If it carries the specialised sense seen in Old Irish ith ('corn, grain'), the name means roughly 'those rich in corn'. If it keeps the root's basic sense 'to swell', it means roughly 'big in fury', comparable to the name of the Belgi ('the proud/wrathful people')

The interpretation is bound up with that of the neighbouring Boisci. On the reading that Boisci means 'the fighters', the belligerent sense of Itimari would match it, while on the reading that Boisci means 'cattle-owners', Itimari would offer a contrast as cultivators of grain.

== Geography ==
The two sources place the Itimari in different regions. In Priscus the group lives near the Danube, whereas in Jordanes it is set on the edge of Scythia by the Maeotis (Sea of Azov). The discrepancy need not be decisive, since the 'vicinity' of a river in ancient geographical writing could cover a considerable distance. Nicopolis ad Istrum, for instance, lay about 100 km from the Danube. The placement by the Sea of Azov has been accepted, with reservations, by several Russian and Ukrainian scholars.

A Celtic presence around the Maeotis has sometimes been argued from a Byzantine list of bishoprics that calls the region 'Galatia', but there are no actual linguistic traces of Celtic there, and the Celticity of the names of southern Ukraine has been judged non-existent.

== Ethnic identity ==
Both notices set the Itimari in the orbit of the Huns. Jordanes presents them, with their neighbours, as peoples overrun by the Huns rather than as Huns themselves, swept up when the invaders crossed the Maeotic marshes. Priscus records that, in the reign of Rua, the Boisci and the other tribes near the Danube fled to take service on the Roman side.

The ethnic and linguistic character of this cluster of peoples has been disputed. Besides the Celtic interpretation of the names Boisci and Itimari, the group has often been regarded as ethnically Hunnic and linguistically Turkic, while C. D. Gordon connected the neighbouring Amilzuri with a complex of probably Germanic tribes.

Maenchen-Helfen supposed that a confederacy of Hunnic, Celtic and other peoples existed in southern Russia before the arrival of the Huns of Attila. According to Alexander Falileyev, the Itimari and the Boisci represent the easternmost Celtic peoples attested in Europe, with the essential qualification that this holds only of their names.
