= Orestes (father of Romulus Augustulus) =

Roman politician and general (420–476)

- Born: Before 433
- Died: 28 August 476
- Office: Magister militum
- Children: Romulus Augustulus
- Father: Tatulus

Orestes (died 28 August 476) was a Roman general and politician of Germanic ancestry. He joined the court of Attila the Hun in his native Pannonia, in which he reached a high position, becoming one of Attila's most trusted men. Orestes also held considerable influence in the late Western Roman Empire. His son Romulus Augustulus became Roman Emperor of the West.

== Biography ==
Born to a Roman aristocratic family from Pannonia Savia, Orestes was of Germanic descent. He was the son of Tatulus, a pagan, and son-in-law to Romulus, from Poetovio, who served as comes in the Western Roman Empire.

After Pannonia was ceded to Attila the Hun, Orestes joined Attila's court, becoming one of Attila's intimate advisors and most trusted lieutenants, and reaching high position as a secretary (notarius) in 449 and 452. In 449 Attila sent him twice to Constantinople with ambassador Eslas.

In 475, Orestes was appointed magister militum and patricius by Western Roman Emperor Julius Nepos. This proved to be a mistake on the part of Nepos. By 28 August 475, Orestes, at the head of the foederati levies, managed to take control of the government in Ravenna, which had been the de facto capital of the Western Roman Empire since 402. Julius Nepos fled without a fight to Dalmatia, where he would continue to reign until his assassination in 480. With the emperor far away, Orestes elevated his son Romulus as augustus, recognized by most historians as the last Western Roman emperor. He was nicknamed Augustulus, meaning "little Augustus", as the emperor was only a child at the time he became emperor in 475.

During the reign of his son Romulus Augustulus, Orestes was the real power behind the throne. He concluded a peace treaty with the kingdom of the Vandals in Carthage in 475. On August 28, 476, following the rebellion started by Odoacer over the empire's refusal to grant land in Italy to its Germanic allies, Orestes was captured and beheaded.

== In popular culture ==
- Orestes was played by Andrew Pleavin in the 2001 miniseries Attila, which depicts his time in service of the Hunnic king.
- The character of Orestes was played by Iain Glen in the 2007 historical-fiction film The Last Legion, which shows the character during his period of rule in Rome, although the film deviates significantly from the historical record of these events.
- Orestes is portrayed as the primary villain in Michael Curtis Ford's novel The Fall of Rome.

== See also ==
- Roman usurper
- List of Roman usurpers

Military offices
Preceded by Ecdicius	Magister militum of the Western Roman army 475–476	Succeeded by Post abolished
