= Bendegúz =

- Gender: Masculine

Origin
- Language: Turkic
- Origin: Turkish > Hungarian
- Meaning: "pearl" or "bead"

Other names
- Related names: Mundzuk

Bendegúz is a Hungarian masculine given name. It is the Hungarian version of the Turkic name Mundzuk, which was the name of Atilla the Hun's father. It likely derives from the Turkic word for 'bead' or 'pearl', mončuq.

Notable people with the given name include:

- Mundzuk, known as Bendegúz in Hungarian, Hunnic chieftain, brother of the Hunnic rulers Octar and Rugila, and father of Bleda and Attila
- Bendegúz Bóka (born 1993), Hungarian footballer
- Bendegúz Bolla (born 1999), Hungarian footballer
- Bendegúz Bujdosó (born 1994), Hungarian handball player
- Bendegúz Farkas (born 2004), Hungarian footballer
- Bendegúz Pétervári-Molnár (born 1993), Hungarian rower
