= Eslas =

Hun diplomat

Eslas (fl. 450) was a Hun negotiator, supervisor, diplomat and orator. He was sent by Attila on a diplomatic mission to Constantinople.

== Overview ==
Eslas was one of the most experienced Hunnish ambassadors. Fifteen years before he was sent to Constantinople by Attila, he had negotiated with Theodosius on account of Hun king Rugila.

He became a minder of Vigilas, with whom he was sent to Constantinople by Attila, where Vigilas was to ask for the handing over of any remaining refugees.

The delegation with which historian Priscus reached Attila had been sent upon request of the latter to Theodosius. This action was in turn prompted by Edekon, who had revealed to Attila a Roman plot to assassinate him. The Byzantine Emperor, following the counsel of the eunuch Chrysaphius, had bribed Edekon, one of Attila's close men, and convinced him to participate in a plot to murder the king. Edekon had seemingly accepted, but then showed his loyalty to Atilla by informing him of the plot. After Maximinus' mission, in which Priscus was involved, another ambassador, Bigilas, was sent to the Huns with the gold (fifty pounds) intended to be used to bribe Attila's bodyguards, which he was to deliver to Edekon. Attila, aware of this thanks to Edekon, made Bigilas confess and took his gold, but, instead of impaling him, asked him for another fifty pounds of gold, informing him that if he failed to pay, his son would be executed.

Further, Attila decided to punish the emperor by sending Eslas and Orestes to his court to publicly humiliate him. As Priscus recounts:

"[Attila] instructed Orestes to go to the Emperor wearing around his neck the purse in which Bigilas placed the gold that was to be given to Edeco. He was to display it to the Emperor and the eunuch [Chrysaphius] and to ask if they recognized it."

Attila also instructed Eslas to tell the emperor that he had degraded his line. Once they reached Constantinople, Eslas told the emperor a parable, probably composed by Attila himself:

"Theodosius is the son of a well-born father. Attila too from his father Mundzuk has inherited the condition of noble birth, which he has preserved. Not so Theodosius, who fell from the estate of an ingenuus and became Attila's slave, when he submitted to pay him tribute. He has now conspired against the life of a better man than himself, and one whom Fortune has made his master. This is a foul deed, worthy only of a caitiff slave, and his only way of clearing himself from the guilt which he has thus contracted is to surrender the Eunuch to punishment."

The meaning of this statement is that both men were born noble, but Theodosius had fallen from his dignified station by submitting to pay tribute to Attila, becoming his "slave"; and that therefore he acted ill by devising secret snares against his master like a wicked domestic against his superior, whom fortune had given him for his master.
