= Justa Grata Honoria =

Sister of emperor Valentinian III

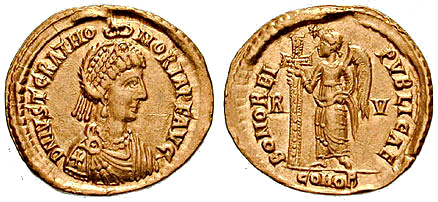
- Solidus of Honoria
- Born: c. 418
- Died: before June 455
Names
- Justa Grata Honoria Augusta
- Dynasty: Theodosian and Valentinian
- Father: Constantius III
- Mother: Galla Placidia

Justa Grata Honoria (c. 418 – c. 455) was the daughter of Constantius III and Galla Placidia, as well as the sister of Valentinian III. At a young age, she was granted the title of Augusta. She was said to have asked Attila the Hun to invade on her behalf, which is often interpreted as a proposal.

== Family ==
Honoria was the only daughter of later Emperor Constantius III and Galla Placidia. Her first two names were after her maternal great-aunts, Justa and Grata, the daughters of Valentinian I and Justina, and the third for the emperor who reigned at the time of her birth, her half-uncle Honorius. Her maternal half-brother Theodosius, born in 414 from the first marriage of Placidia to king Ataulf of the Visigoths, died in infancy, before Honoria was born. Her younger brother, Valentinian III, was her full brother.

== Biography ==
The historical record of most of her life is little more than brief mentions of or allusions to her presence. Oost notes that she accompanied her mother and younger brother as they set sail for Constantinople in spring of 423, and that Honoria was with them when they joined the expeditionary force at Thessalonica in the summer of 424 that would restore Galla Placidia and Valentinian to power in the West. She was included in mosaics of the Imperial family, now lost, at the church attached to the Mausoleum of Galla Placidia and in a church dedicated to Saint John the Evangelist in Ravenna. Last is Carmen I of Merobaudes written circa 443, although a fragmentary poem it clearly includes her in a description of the family of Valentinian III. These details have led Stewart Oost to observe that Honoria came to feel "that life had condemned her to a dull and impotent backwater."

== Honoria Affair ==
She was alleged to have been in relationship with and impregnated by a man that was working within her household, which was discussed by John of Antioch in the 7th century. Prior to this, Honoria had power as a royal Augusta, but this power was taken away following the affair. Being impregnated presented a problem to the line of succession: if Honoria had a son while her brother had daughters, there was a chance that rule could pass to Honoria’s son, not including a possible struggle with Honoria and her lover. The man she had relations with was put to death and she was married to senator Herculanus.

The emperor was distracted with a multitude of different issues, such as the attack of Britain, North Africa, and Spain, as well as the continuous advance of Attila the Hun. The Western empire was being continuously weakened, and Honoria hastened the Huns' invasion with her message to Attila the Hun. In 450, she sent her eunuch, Hyacinthus, to Attila with a message asking for assistance in exchange for a reward, also sending her ring as proof of her earnestness. In response, Attila sent ambassadors to announce that he would marry Honoria and to insist that her title was returned; the Romans refused on both accounts. Shortly afterwards, Attila invaded Roman Gaul.

Honoria was said by contemporaries, such as the historian Priscus of Panium, to be the main cause of Attila’s invasion, but some modern historians have taken a more favorable stance on her. J.B Bury, a proponent of rehabilitating Honoria's reputation, called her "another of those political women whose perils and accomplishments lend color to the history of the Theodosian era." Kenneth Holum has said that her message was not the only factor in provoking the Huns' attack. It is possible that the Huns would have invaded otherwise given their reliance on Roman goods to upkeep their economy. Attila’s army had been advancing for decades; their fight was reinvigorated by Honoria’s letter, as well as power struggles and changes with diplomacy in the Roman empire. Under Theodosius II, embassies sent to Attila continually denied his requests to send higher ranking officials.

The Eastern empire continuously changed their diplomatic strategies, with their highest priority being to make the Eastern emperor look powerful. On the other hand, the Western empire continued the same diplomatic strategies, with little success. Following the death of Emperor Theodosius II, his sister Pulcheria married the military general Marcian while keeping her vow of virginity as an augusta. After ascending to the throne, Marcian stopped tribute payments to the Huns. Prior to invading, the Huns sent Gothic embassies to both empires, from the east they requested to continue the tribute system, while from the west they requested Honoria, assuming that women in the Roman empire were vessels of power. The Hunnic embassies took note of the stronger military in the east, and they decided to invade the west instead.

Attila began his attack in Gaul, which was to fight the Goths to win favor with Geiseric. Meanwhile Roman general Aetius convinced Visgothic king Theodoric to aid in their defense. Together, they had a good chance of defeating the Huns and won the Battle of the Catalaunian Plains. During this battle, Theodoric had been killed in battle, and Aetius returned to Rome in shame rather than fight the vulnerable Huns. The writer Jordanes had claimed that Attila fought this battle to kill Aetius, but there is little support for this notion and is disproved by military accounts of the Huns in Priscus.

Following the affair, Hyacinthus, her eunuch, was tortured and executed. Little is known of Honoria's fate. Galla Placidia had to step in to advocate for her exile, rather than execution to protect Honoria from Valentinian III. In concluding his account of this incident, John of Antioch writes, "And so Honoria was freed from her danger at this time." Regarding the ambiguity of the phrase "at this time", Bury asks, "Does this imply that she incurred some punishment afterwards, worse even than a dull marriage?" Lastly, because her name doesn't appear in the list of important persons carried off to Carthage by the Vandals following their sack of the city, the capture of her sister-in-law and her nieces and the murder of her brother in 455, Oost suggests she was dead by then; whether of natural causes or by order of her brother the Emperor, Oost admits "we do not have evidence adequate" to decide. In 452, her husband Herculanus was appointed as the consul in Rome, possibly as a gesture of the emperor's gratitude for preserving Honoria's honor and reputation.

Ancient writers wrote selectively about women's actions, which makes it difficult to understand her life outside this event. For this reason, historians infer based on scant primary sources. This inhibits the ability for historians to infer the real motivations behind her actions. While Honoria's actions may have contributed to the end of the Western empire, there were plenty of other factors that influenced the fall, such as continuous barbarian invasions, ambitious generals, and weakening imperial authority.

== Portrayals ==
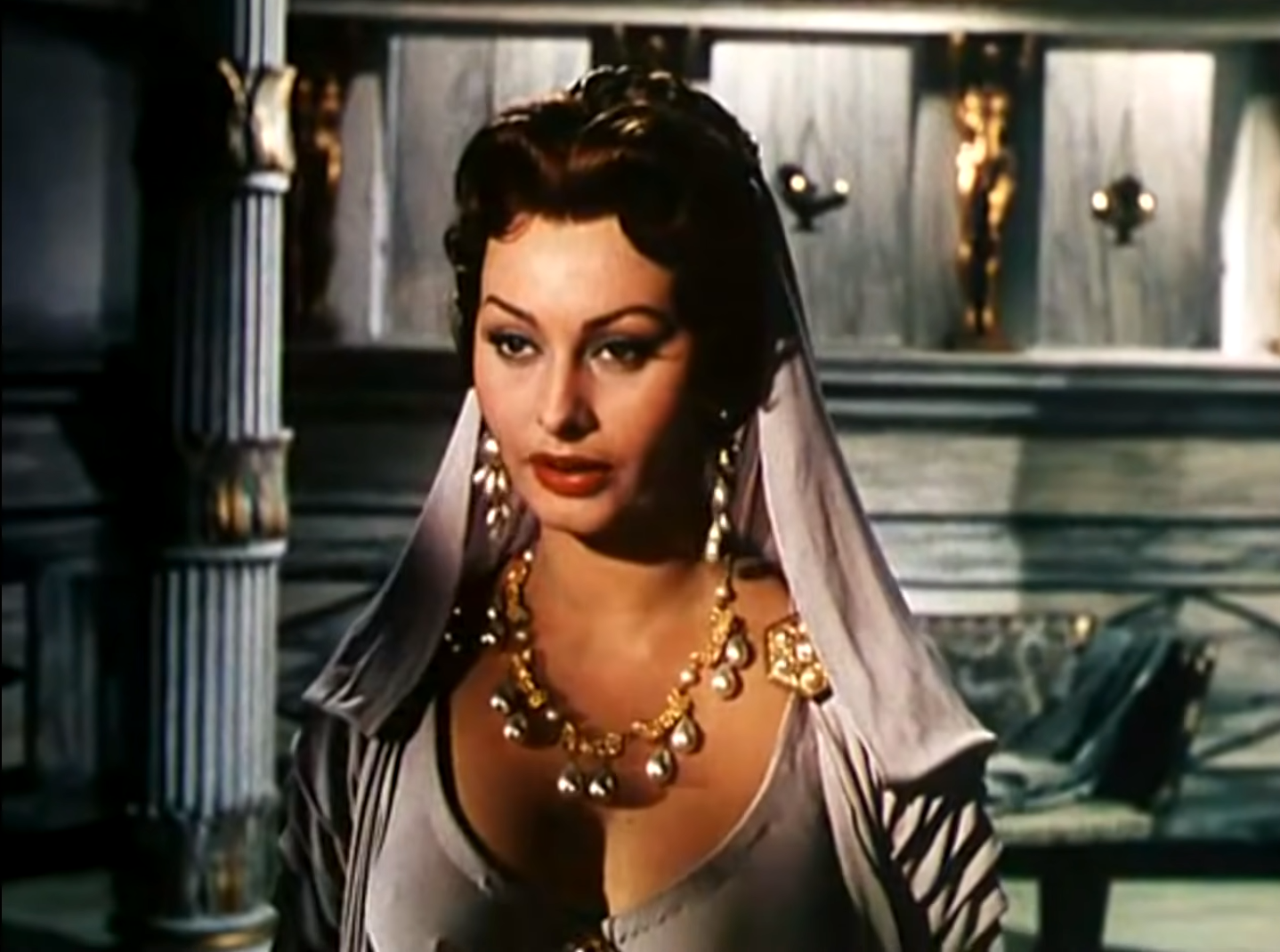
Honoria portrayed by Sophia Loren in the 1954 film Attila

- She was portrayed by Sophia Loren in the 1954 film Attila.
- She was portrayed by Kirsty Mitchell in the 2001 miniseries Attila.
- She was portrayed by Ivelina Ivanova in the 2016 docudrama Barbarians Rising.
- She was portrayed by Kate Nesbit in a 2015 performance of the 1896 verse drama by Michael Field, Attila, my Attila.
