= Sack of Strasbourg (451) =

Destruction of the Roman city by the Huns (451 CE)

- Part of the Hunnic Invasion of Gaul
- Atilla's Invasion of Gaul 451
Date	451 AD
Location	Strasbourg, Western Roman Empire
Result	Hunnic victory

Belligerents
Hunnic Empire	Western Roman Empire

Commanders and leaders
Attila the Hun	Unknown

Strength
Unknown	Unknown

Casualties and losses
Unknown	Strasbourg completely destroyed, heavy casualties

Strasbourg was one of the cities burned and sacked by Atilla the Hun during his Gallic campaign of 451. The city was destroyed.

== Prelude ==
Atilla the Hun had been a major threat to the Western Roman Empire he fought many battles against them and would burn and sack the cities he entered earning him the name "Scourage of God". One of his most famous Campaigns was Gaul, where one of his most famous and successful battles would take place the Battle of the Catalaunian Plains.

== Destruction of Strasbourg ==
In 451 Atilla the Hun launched an Invasion of Gaul against the Western Roman Empire, Atilla the Hun began the Campaign of sacking and burning cities. He ravaged most of Gaul, one of the cities that were attacked was Strasbourg as it was the center of Gaul. When Atilla the Hun entered Strasbourg, he and his army began massacring and burning the city to the ground. The city was fully destroyed, and its civilians were killed.
