= Bleda =

Chieftain of the Huns
- Reign: 434–445
- Predecessor: Ruga
- Successor: Attila
- Co-ruler: Attila (434-445)
- Born: c. 400
- Died: c. 445 (aged 45)
- Father: Mundzuk

Bleda (/ˈblɛdə, ˈbleɪdə/) was a Hunnic ruler, the brother of Attila the Hun. As nephews to Rugila, Attila and his elder brother Bleda succeeded him to the throne. Bleda's reign lasted for eleven years until his death. While it has been speculated by Jordanes that Attila murdered him on a hunting trip, it is unknown exactly how he died. One of the few things known about Bleda is that, after the great Hun campaign of 441, he acquired a Moorish dwarf named Zerco. Bleda was highly amused by Zerco and went so far as to make a suit of armor for the dwarf so that Zerco could accompany him on campaign.

== Etymology ==
Greek sources have Βλήδας and Βλέδας (Bledas), Chronicon Paschale Βλίδας (Blidas), and Latin Bleda.

Otto Maenchen-Helfen considered the name to be of Germanic or Germanized origin, a short form of Bladardus, Blatgildus, Blatgisus. Denis Sinor considered that the name begins with consonant cluster, and as such it cannot be of Altaic origin. In 455 is recorded the Arian bishop Bleda along Genseric and the Vandals, and one of Totila's generals also had the same name.

Omeljan Pritsak considered its root bli- had typical vocalic metathesis of Oghur-Bulgar language from < *bil-, which is Old Turkic "to know". Thus Hunnic *bildä > blidä was actually Old Turkic bilgä (wise, sovereign).

== Legacy ==
Bleda is known by Hungarian literature as Buda. According to medieval sources, Buda the name of the historic capital of the Kingdom of Hungary derived from the name of its founder, Bleda, brother of Hunnic ruler Attila. The name of the capital city of Hungary, Budapest also comes from his name.

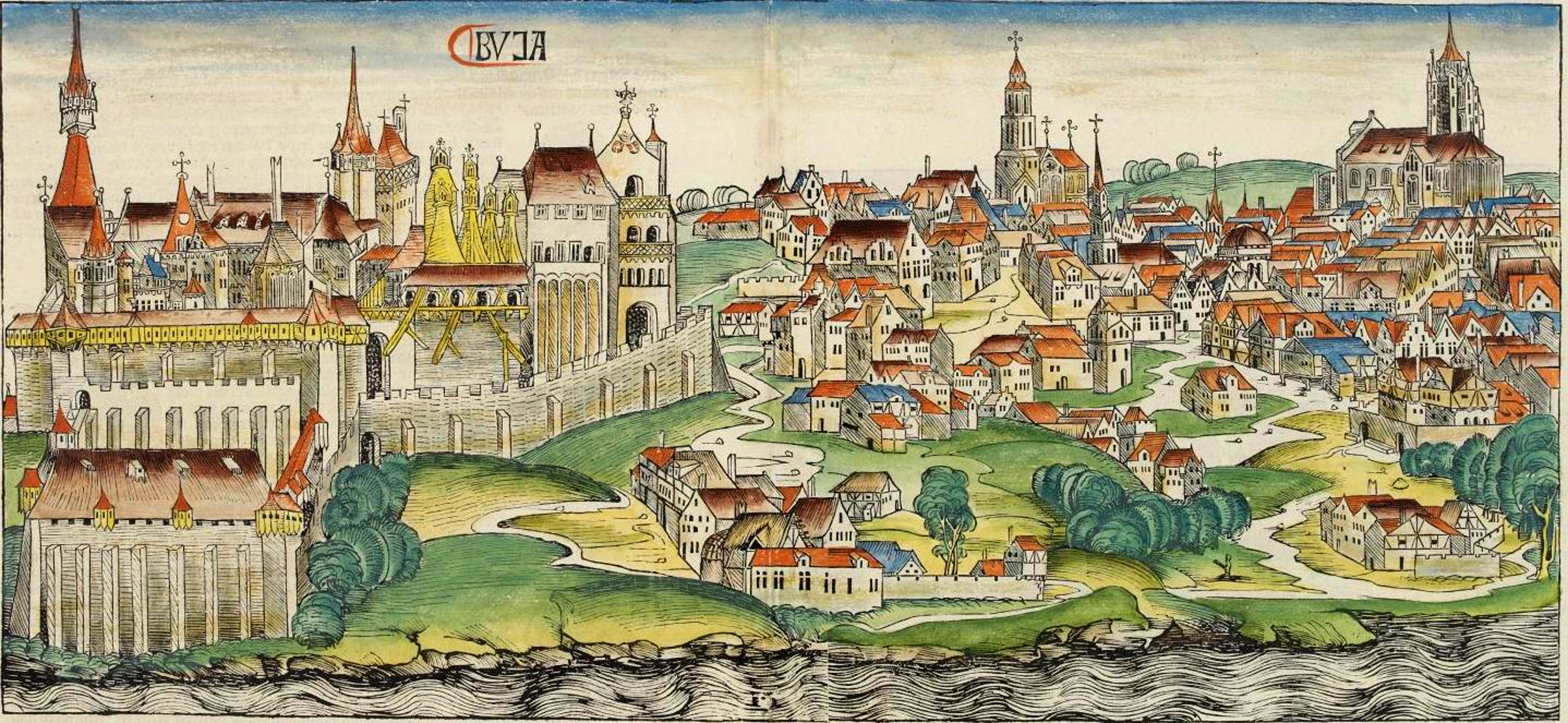
Buda in the Middle Ages (Nuremberg Chronicle, 1493)

Attila went in the city of Sicambria in Pannonia, where he killed Buda, his brother, and he threw his corpse into the Danube. For while Attila was in the west, his brother crossed the boundaries in his reign, because he named Sicambria after his own name Buda's Castle. And though King Attila forbade the Huns and the other peoples to call that city Buda's Castle, but he called it Attila's Capital, the Germans who were terrified by the prohibition named the city as Eccylburg, which means Attila Castle, however, the Hungarians did not care about the ban and call it Óbuda [Old Buda] and call it to this day.

— Mark of Kalt: Chronicon Pictum

The Scythians are certainly an ancient people and the strength of Scythia lies in the east, as we said above. And the first king of Scythia was Magog, son of Japhet, and his people were called Magyars [Hungarians] after their King Magog, from whose royal line the most renowned and mighty King Attila descended, who, in the 451st year of Our Lord's birth, coming down from Scythia, entered Pannonia with a mighty force and, putting the Romans to flight, took the realm and made a royal residence for himself beside the Danube above the hot springs, and he ordered all the old buildings that he found there to be restored and he built them in a circular and very strong wall that in the Hungarian language is now called Budavár [Buda Castle] and by the Germans Etzelburg [Attila Castle]

— Anonymus: Gesta Hungarorum

== Portrayals ==
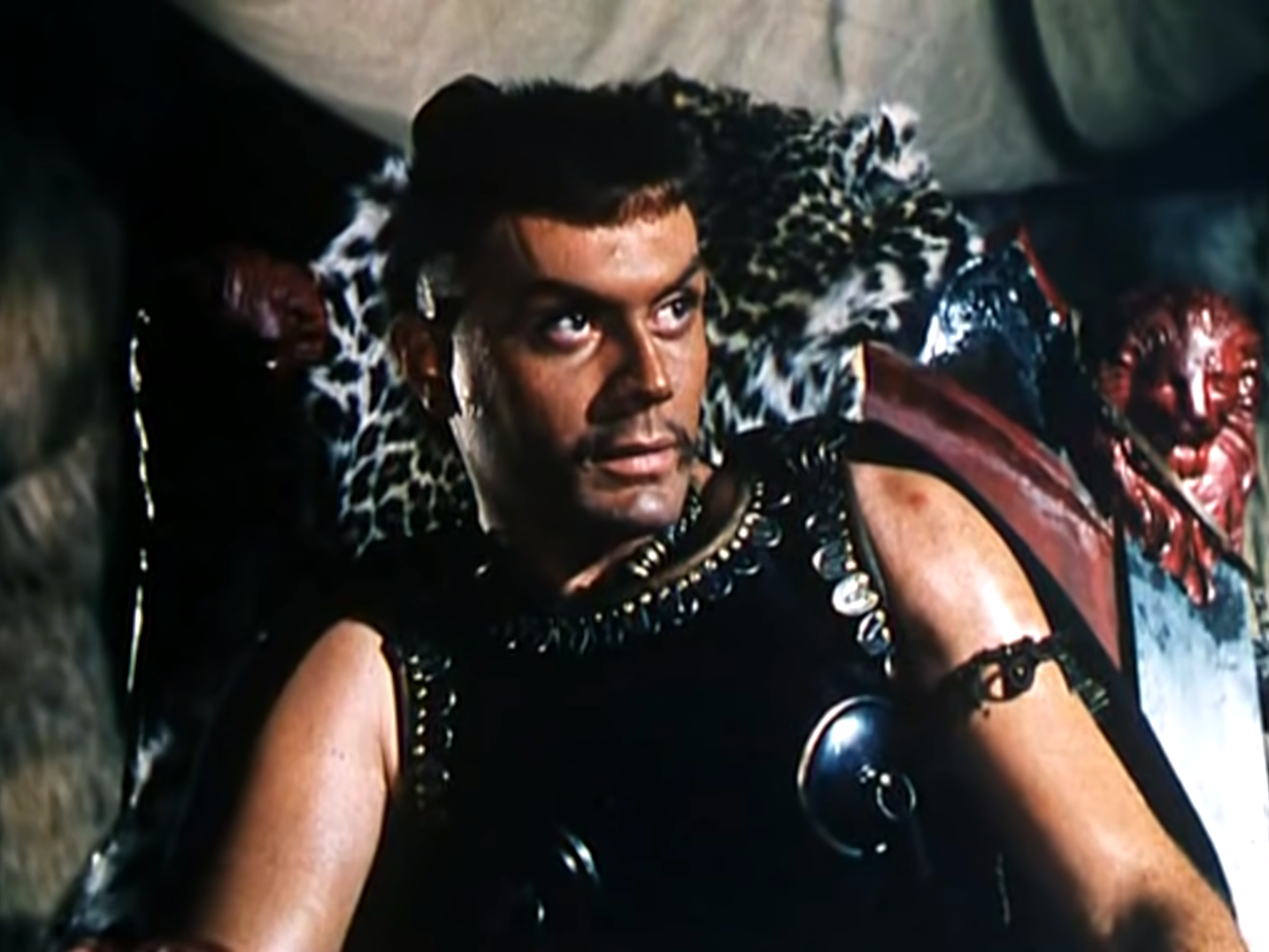
Bleda portrayed by Ettore Manni in Attila

- Ettore Manni portrayed Bleda in the 1954 Anthony Quinn film.
- Leo Gordon was Bleda in Sign of the Pagan, released the same year.
- Scottish actor Tommy Flanagan played Bleda in the 2001 mini-series, opposite Gerard Butler, as Attila.

== Sources ==
- Priscus. Byzantine History. Bury, J. B. (English translation). Priscus at the court of Attila (online); Dindorf, Ludwig (1870) (the original Greek). Historici Graeci Minores. Leipzig: Teubner.
- Maenchen-Helfen, Otto J. (1973). The World of the Huns: Studies in Their History and Culture. University of California Press. ISBN 9780520015968.
- Pritsak, Omeljan (1982). "The Hunnic Language of the Attila Clan" (PDF). Harvard Ukrainian Studies. IV (4). Cambridge, Massachusetts: Harvard Ukrainian Research Institute. ISSN 0363-5570. Archived from the original (PDF) on 2016-12-13.
- Sinor, Denis (1990). The Cambridge History of Early Inner Asia. Cambridge University Press. ISBN 9780521243049.
- Hyun Jin Kim (2013). The Huns, Rome and the Birth of Europe. Cambridge University Press. ISBN 9781107009066.
- Heather, Peter (2006). The fall of the Roman Empire : a new history of Rome and the Barbarians (1st ed.). Oxford University Press. pp. 300–312. ISBN 9780195325416.

Preceded by Rugila	Hunnic rulers Joint rule Attila & Bleda c. 435–445	Succeeded by Attila
