= Mundzuk =

Chieftain of the Huns; father of Attila

Mundzuk was a Hunnic chieftain, brother of the Hunnic rulers Octar and Rugila, and father of Bleda and Attila by an unknown consort. Jordanes in Getica recounts "For this Attila was the son of Mundzucus, whose brothers were Octar and Ruas, who were supposed to have been kings before Attila, although not altogether of the same [territories] as he".

== Etymology ==
The etymology of the name "Mundzuk" is disputed. It is recorded as Mundzucus by Jordanes, Mundiucus by Cassiodorus, Μουνδίουχος (Moundioukhos) by Priscus, and Μουνδίου (Moundiou) by Theophanes of Byzantium. A Germanic etymology was proposed by Karl Müllenhoff in the 19th century: he noted the similarity of the name's second element to that of the Burgundian king Gundioc and the Frankish king Merovech. According to Gerhard Doerfer, the name can be derived from a Gothic *Mundiweihs, from mund- (protection) and weihs (battle). Gottfried Schramm rejects a Germanic origin for the name because Mundzuk must have been born before 373, when the Huns and Goths first came into contact.

Gyula Németh and László Rásonyi argued that the name is a transcription of Turkic munčuq, munʒuq, minʒaq, bunčuq, bonʒuq, mončuq, with the potential meanings of "jewel, pearl, bead" or "flag". (Note: For Turkic *munʒu, Finnish linguist Aulis J. Joki (apud Pritsak, 1982) proposes Old Chinese etymology: from 璊, OC:*‍mwən ~ *muən (Karlgren) ~ *mu:n (ZS), mod. mén "red gem" and 珠, OC:*‍tśi̯u ~ *ti̯u (Karlgren) ~ *tjo(ZS), mod. zhū "pearl".) Gerhard Doerfer argues that this derivation is unlikely because in the oldest Turkic inscriptions this word is written beginning with a b (*bunčuq) rather than an m.

== Legacy ==
Known as Bendegúz in Hungarian, he appears in Hungary's national anthem as an ancestor of the Hungarians. In the years of 2003–2009, Bendegúz was the 54th–66th most common male baby name in Hungary.
