= Rugila =

King of the Huns
- Reign: 430–c. 435
- Predecessor: Octar
- Successor: Bleda
- Born: c. 365
- Died: c. 435 (aged 70)
- Father: Uldin

Rugila or Ruga (also Ruas; died second half of the 430s AD), was a ruler who was a major factor in the Huns' early victories over the Roman Empire. He served as an important forerunner with his brother Octar, with whom he initially ruled in dual kingship, possibly a geographical division where Rugila ruled over Eastern Huns while Octar over Western Huns, during the 5th century AD.

== Etymology ==
The name is mentioned in three variants, Ρούγας (Rougas), Ρούας (Rouas), and Ρωίλας (Roilas). Common spellings are Ruga, Roas, Rugila. Otto Maenchen-Helfen included this name among those of Germanic or Germanized origin, but without any derivation, only comparison with Rugemirus and Rugolf. Denis Sinor considered a name with initial r- not of Altaic origin (example Ragnaris).

Omeljan Pritsak derived it from Old Turkic and considered it to be of composite form, with the change ουγα- > ουα, Greek suffix -ς, and those with ila as Gothicized variant. The Ancient Greek Ρ (rho) would thus render Hunnic *hr-, which Pristak connects to Old Turkic *her > har/ar/er (man), common component of names and titles. He connects the second part, ουγα- or ουα, to the Old Turkic title ogä (to think). Thus Pritsak reconstructs a development of *hēr ögä > *hər ögä > hrögä.

== History ==
Initially Rugila had ruled together with his brother Octar, who died in 430 during a military campaign against the Burgundians. In 432, Rugila is mentioned as a sole ruler of the Huns. According to Prosper of Aquitaine, "After the loss of his office, Aetius lived on his estate. When there some of his enemies by an unexpected attack attempted to seize him, he fled to Rome, and from there to Dalmatia. By the way of Pannonia, he reached the Huns. Through their friendship and help he obtained peace with the rulers and was reinstated in his old office. Ruga was ruler of the gens Chunorum". Priscus recounts "in the land of the Paeonians on the river Sava, which according to the treaty of Aetius, general of the Western Romans, belonged to the barbarian", some scholars explain this as meaning that Aetius ceded part of Pannonia Prima to Ruga. Scholars date this cession to 425, 431, or 433. Maenchen-Helfen considered that the area was ceded to Attila.

In 422, there was a major Hunnic incursion into Thracia launched from Danube, menacing even Constantinople, which ended with a peace treaty by which Romans had to pay annually 350 pounds of gold. In 432–433, some tribes from Hunnic confederation on the Danube fled to Roman territory and service of Theodosius II. Rugila demanded through his experienced diplomat Esla return of all fugitives, otherwise the peace would be terminated, but soon died and was succeeded by sons of his brother Mundzuk, Bleda and Attila, who became joint rulers of the united Hunnic tribes.

The Eastern Roman politician Plinta along quaestor Epigenes nevertheless had to go for adverse negotiations at Margus; according to Priscus, it included trade agreement, the annual tribute was raised to 700 pounds of gold, and fugitives were surrendered, among whom two of royal descent, Mamas and Atakam probably because of conversion to Christianity, were crucified by the Huns at Carso (Hârșova).

According to Socrates of Constantinople, Theodosius II prayed to God and managed to obtain what he sought - Ruga was struck dead by a thunderbolt, and among his men followed plague, and fire came down from the heaven consuming his survivors. This text is panegyric on Theodosius II, and happened shortly after 425 AD. Similarly, Theodoret recounts that God helped Theodosius II because he issued a law that ordered destruction of all pagan temples, and Ruga's death was the abundant harvest that followed these good seeds. However, the edict was issued on November 14, 435 AD, so Ruga died after that date. Chronica Gallica of 452 places his death in 434, "Aetius is restored to favor. Rugila, king of the Huns, with whom peace was made, dies. Bleda succeeds him".

== Sources ==
- Maenchen-Helfen, Otto J. (1973). The World of the Huns: Studies in Their History and Culture. University of California Press. ISBN 9780520015968.
- Pritsak, Omeljan (1982). "The Hunnic Language of the Attila Clan" (PDF). Harvard Ukrainian Studies. IV (4). Cambridge, Massachusetts: Harvard Ukrainian Research Institute. ISSN 0363-5570.
- Sinor, Denis (1990). The Cambridge History of Early Inner Asia. Cambridge University Press. ISBN 9780521243049.

Preceded by Joint rule Octar & Rugila	King of the Huns; Alone; 430 – c. 435	Succeeded by Joint rule Attila & Bleda
