= Attila =

Ruler of the Hunnic Empire from 434 to 453

King and chieftain of the Hunnic Empire
- Reign: 434–453
- Predecessor: Ruga
- Successor: Ellac, Dengizich, Ernak
- Co-ruler: Bleda (434–445)
- Born: c. 406
- Died: 453 (aged 46–47)
- Spouse: Kreka; Ildico; Gudrun/Kreimhild (Legend)
- Father: Mundzuk

Attila (/əˈtɪlə/ ə-TIL-ə or /ˈætɪlə/ AT-il-ə; c. 406 – 453), frequently called Attila the Hun and also known by his nickname "the Scourge of God", was the ruler of the Huns from 434 until his death in early 453. He was also the leader of an empire consisting of Huns, Ostrogoths, Alans, and Gepids, among others, in Central and Eastern Europe.

As nephews to Rugila, Attila and his elder brother Bleda succeeded him to the throne in 435, ruling jointly until the death of Bleda in 445. During his reign, Attila was one of the most feared enemies of the Western and Eastern Roman Empires. He crossed the Danube twice and plundered the Balkans but was unable to take Constantinople, stopped by the double walls of the Eastern capital. The Huns defeated a second army near Callipolis (Gelibolu). In 441, he led an invasion of the Eastern Roman (Byzantine) Empire, the success of which emboldened him to invade the West. He also attempted to conquer Roman Gaul (modern France), crossing the Rhine in 451 and marching as far as Aurelianum (Orléans), before being stopped in the Battle of the Catalaunian Plains.

He subsequently invaded Italy, devastating the northern provinces, but was unable to take Rome. He planned for further campaigns against the Romans but died in 453. After Attila's death, his close adviser, Ardaric of the Gepids, led a successful revolt against Hunnic rule, after which the Hunnic Empire quickly collapsed. Attila lived on as a character in Germanic heroic legend.

== Etymology ==
Most scholars have argued that the name Attila derives from an East Germanic language such as Gothic atta meaning "father", together with a diminutive suffix -ila, meaning "little father" (compare Wulfila from wulfs "wolf" and -ila, i.e. "little wolf"). The Gothic etymology was first proposed by Jacob and Wilhelm Grimm in the early 19th century. Maenchen-Helfen notes that this derivation of the name "offers neither phonetic nor semantic difficulties", and Gerhard Doerfer notes that the name is simply correct Gothic. Alexander Savelyev and Choongwon Jeong (2020) similarly state that Attila's name "must have been Gothic in origin". The name has sometimes been interpreted as a Germanization of a name of Hunnic origin.

Other scholars have argued for a Turkic origin of the name. Omeljan Pritsak considered Ἀττίλα (Attíla) a composite title-name which derived from Turkic *es (great, old), and *til (sea, ocean), and the suffix /a/. The stressed back syllabic til assimilated the front member es, so it became *as. It is a nominative, in form of attíl- (< *etsíl < *es tíl) with the meaning "the oceanic, universal ruler". J. J. Mikkola connected it with Turkic āt (name, fame). As another Turkic possibility, H. Althof (1902) considered it was related to Turkish atli (horseman, cavalier), or Turkish at (horse) and dil (tongue). Maenchen-Helfen argues that Pritsak's derivation is "ingenious but for many reasons unacceptable", while dismissing Mikkola's as "too farfetched to be taken seriously". M. Snædal similarly notes that none of these proposals has achieved wide acceptance.

Criticizing the proposals of finding Turkic or other etymologies for Attila, Doerfer notes that King George VI of the United Kingdom had a name of Greek origin, and Süleyman the Magnificent had a name of Arabic origin, yet that does not make them Greek or Arab: it is therefore plausible that Attila would have a name not of Hunnic origin. Historian Hyun Jin Kim, however, has argued that the Turkic etymology is "more probable".

M. Snædal, in a paper that rejects the Germanic derivation but notes the problems with the existing proposed Turkic etymologies, argues that Attila's name could have originated from Turkic-Mongolian at, adyy/agta (gelding, warhorse) and Turkish atlı (horseman, cavalier), meaning "possessor of geldings, provider of warhorses".

In 2025, Svenja Bonmann and Simon Fries, as part of their hypothesis that the Huns spoke a Yeniseian language, proposed that the name Attila could come from an Old Arin adjective *atɨ-la, meaning "quick, quicker, quite quick, rather quick, quick-ish".

== Historiography and sources ==
Sculpture of Attila by George S. Stuart (Museum of Ventura County)

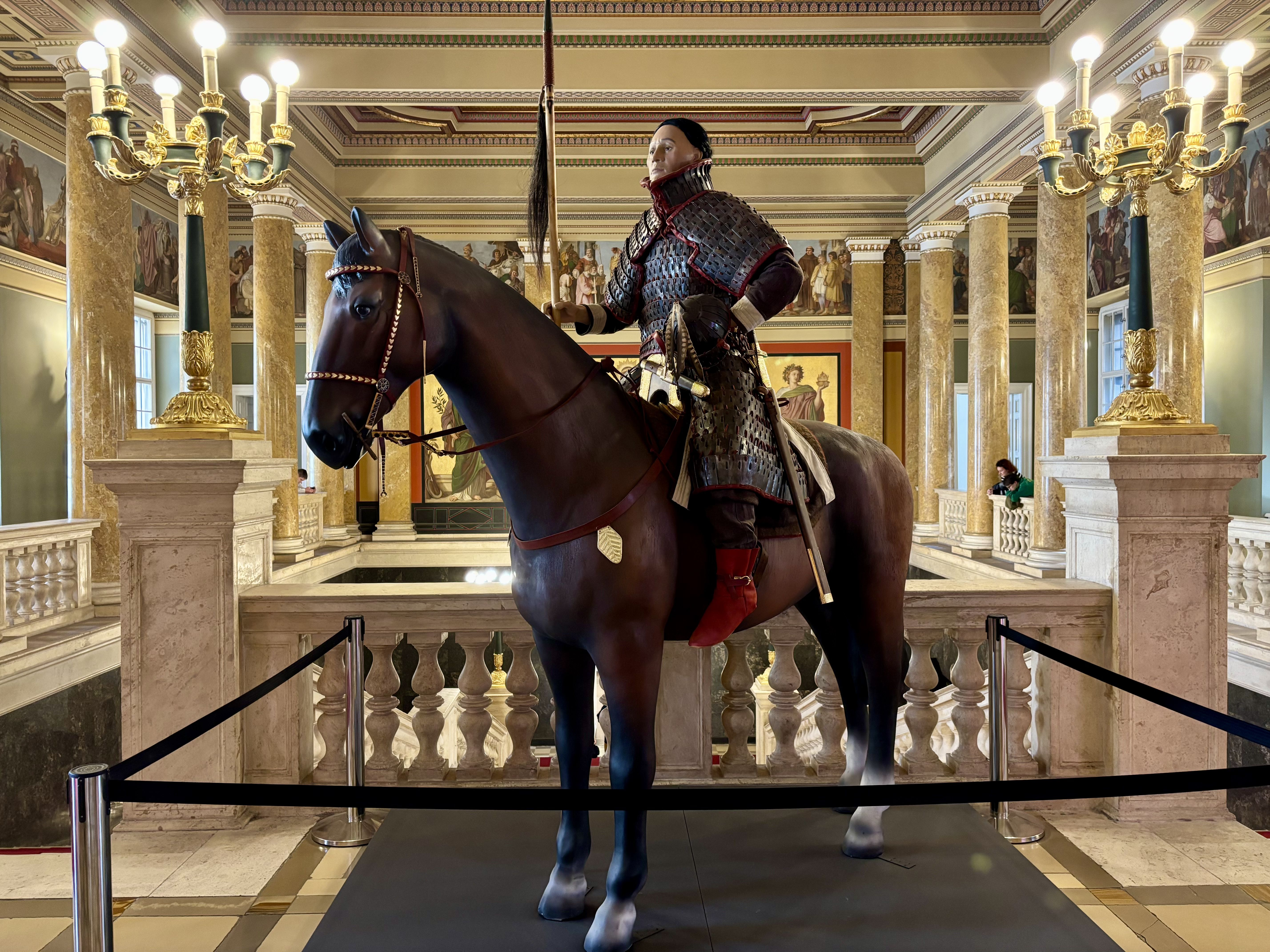
A reconstructed Hun warrior (Hungarian National Museum, Attila exhibition, 2026)

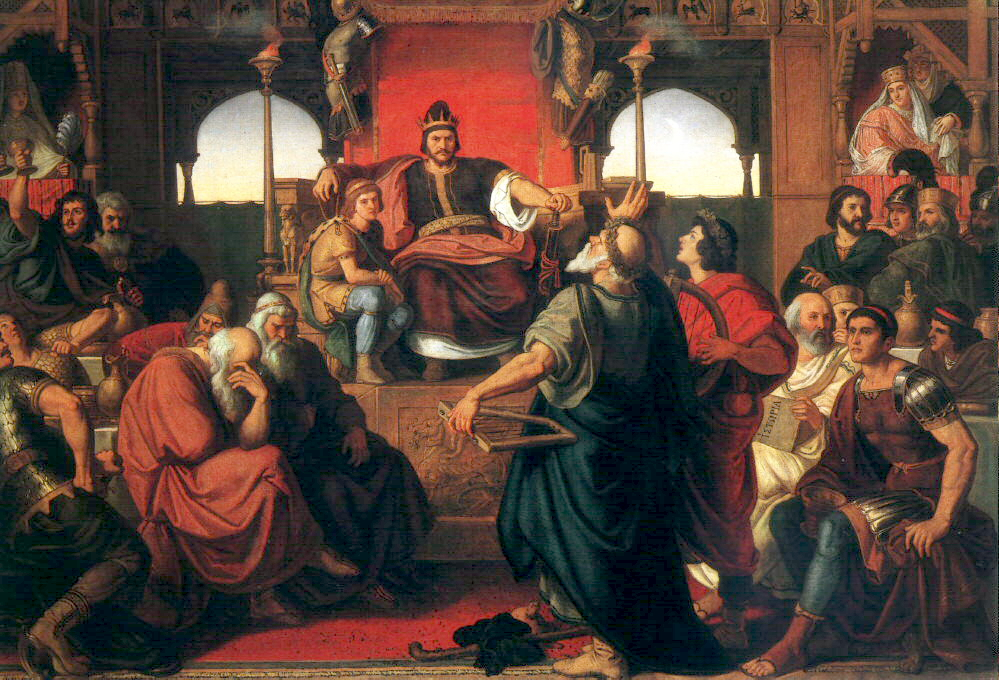
Mór Than's 19th century painting of The Feast of Attila, based on a fragment of Priscus

The historiography of Attila is faced with a major challenge, in that the only complete sources are written in Greek and Latin by the enemies of the Huns. Attila's contemporaries left many testimonials of his life, but only fragments of these remain. Priscus was a Byzantine diplomat and historian who wrote in Greek, and he was both a witness to and an actor in the story of Attila, as a member of the embassy of Theodosius II at the Hunnic court in 449. He was obviously biased by his political position, but his writing is a major source for information on the life of Attila, and he is the only person known to have recorded a physical description of him. He wrote a history of the late Roman Empire in eight books covering the period from 430 to 476.

Only fragments of Priscus's work remain. It was cited extensively by 6th-century historians Procopius and Jordanes, especially in Jordanes's The Origin and Deeds of the Goths, which contains numerous references to Priscus's history, and it is also an important source of information about the Hunnic empire and its neighbors. He describes the legacy of Attila and the Hunnic people for a century after Attila's death. Marcellinus Comes, a chancellor of Justinian during the same era, also describes the relations between the Huns and the Eastern Roman Empire.

Numerous ecclesiastical writings contain useful but scattered information, sometimes difficult to authenticate or distorted by years of hand-copying between the 6th and 17th centuries. The Hungarian writers of the 12th century wished to portray the Huns in a positive light as their glorious ancestors, and so repressed certain historical elements and added their own legends.

The literature and knowledge of the Huns themselves was transmitted orally, by means of epics and chanted poems that were handed down from generation to generation. Indirectly, fragments of this oral history have reached us via the literature of the Scandinavians and Germans, neighbors of the Huns who wrote between the 9th and 13th centuries. Attila is a major character in many Medieval epics, such as the Nibelungenlied, as well as various Eddas and sagas.

Archaeological investigation has uncovered some details about the lifestyle, art, and warfare of the Huns. There are a few traces of battles and sieges, but the tomb of Attila and the location of his capital have not yet been found.

== Appearance and character ==
There is no surviving first-hand account of Attila's appearance, but there is a possible second-hand source provided by Jordanes, who cites a description given by Priscus.

He was a man born into the world to shake the nations, the scourge of all lands, who in some way terrified all mankind by the dreadful rumors noised abroad concerning him. He was haughty in his walk, rolling his eyes hither and thither, so that the power of his proud spirit appeared in the movement of his body. He was indeed a lover of war, yet restrained in action, mighty in counsel, gracious to suppliants and lenient to those who were once received into his protection. Short of stature, with a broad chest and a large head; his eyes were small, his beard thin and sprinkled with grey; and he had a flat nose and swarthy skin, showing evidence of his origin.

Some scholars have suggested that these features are typically East Asian, because in combination they fit the physical type of people from Eastern Asia, so Attila's ancestors may have come from there. Other historians have suggested that the same features may have been typical of some Scythian people.

== Early life and background ==
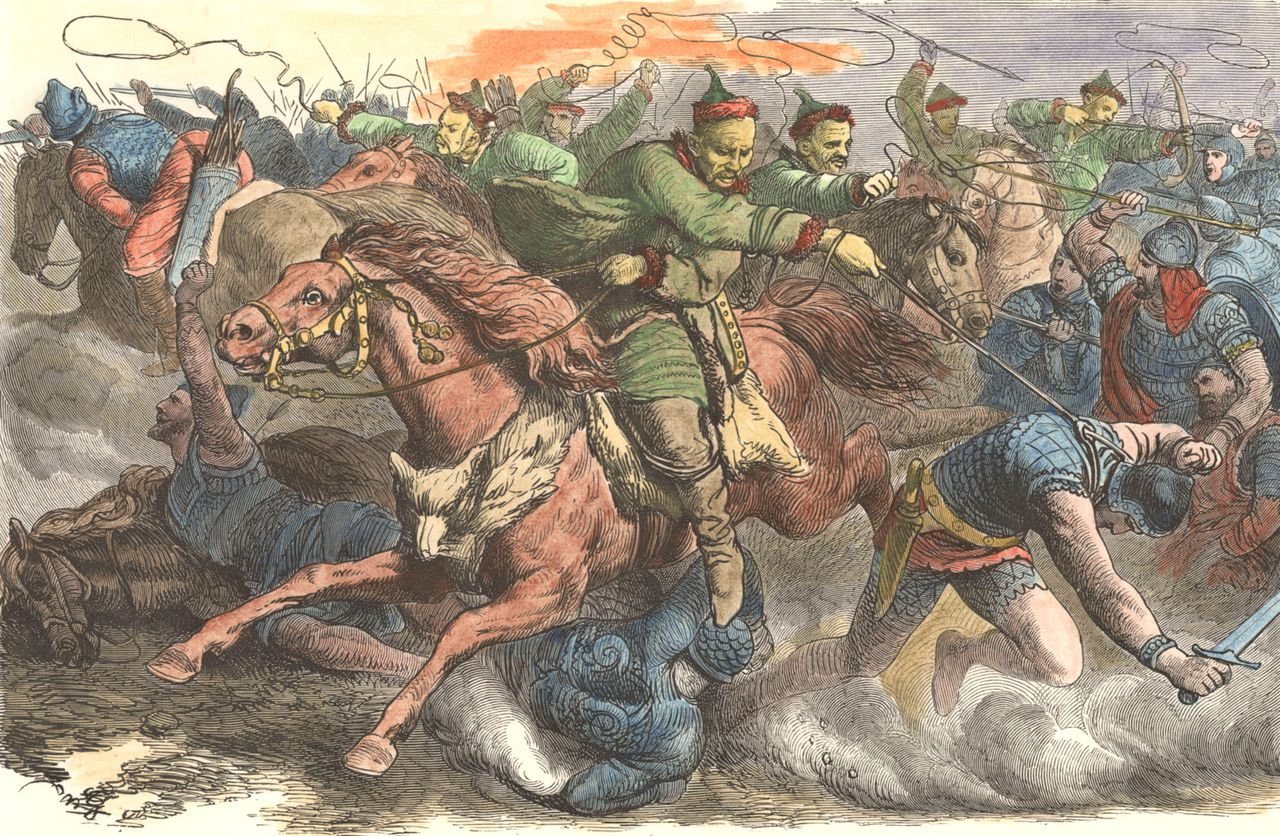
Huns in battle with the Alans. An 1870s engraving after a drawing by Johann Nepomuk Geiger (1805–1880).

The Huns were a group of Eurasian nomads, appearing from east of the Volga, who migrated further into Western Europe c. 370 and built up an enormous empire there. Their main military techniques were mounted archery and javelin throwing. They were in the process of developing settlements before their arrival in Western Europe, yet the Huns were a society of pastoral warriors, whose primary form of nourishment was meat and milk, products of their herds.

The origin and language of the Huns has been the subject of debate for centuries. According to some theories, their leaders at least may have spoken a Turkic language, perhaps closest to the modern Chuvash language. According to the Encyclopedia of European Peoples, "the Huns, especially those who migrated to the west, may have been a combination of central Asian Turkic, Mongolic, and Ugric stocks".

Attila's father Mundzuk was the brother of Kings Octar and Ruga, who reigned jointly over the Hunnic empire in the early fifth century. This form of diarchy was recurrent with the Huns, but historians are unsure whether it was institutionalized, merely customary, or an occasional occurrence. His family was from a noble lineage, but it is uncertain whether they constituted a royal dynasty. Attila's birthdate is debated; journalist Éric Deschodt and writer Herman Schreiber have proposed a date of 395. However, historian Iaroslav Lebedynsky and archaeologist Katalin Escher prefer an estimate between the 390s and the first decade of the 5th century. Several historians have proposed 406 as the date.

Attila grew up in a rapidly changing world. His people were nomads who had only recently arrived in Europe. They crossed the Volga river during the 370s and annexed the territory of the Alans, then attacked the Gothic kingdom between the Carpathian Mountains and the Danube. They were a very mobile people, whose mounted archers had acquired a reputation for invincibility. Vast populations fleeing the Huns moved from Germania into the Roman Empire in the west and south, and along the banks of the Rhine and Danube. In 376, the Goths crossed the Danube, initially submitting to the Romans but soon rebelling against Emperor Valens, whom they killed in the Battle of Adrianople in 378. Large numbers of Vandals, Alans, Suebi, and Burgundians crossed the Rhine and invaded Roman Gaul on 31 December 406, to escape the Huns. The Roman Empire had been split in half since 395 and was ruled by two distinct governments, one based in Ravenna in the West, and the other in Constantinople in the East. The Roman Emperors, both East and West, were generally from the Theodosian family in Attila's lifetime (despite several power struggles).

The Huns dominated a vast territory with nebulous borders determined by the will of a constellation of ethnically varied peoples. Some were assimilated to Hunnic nationality, whereas many retained their own identities and rulers but acknowledged the suzerainty of the king of the Huns. The Huns were also the indirect source of many of the Romans' problems, driving various the Goths and Alans into Roman territory, yet relations between the two empires were cordial: the Romans used the Huns as mercenaries, even in their civil wars. Thus, the usurper Joannes was able to recruit thousands of Huns for his army against Valentinian III in 424. It was Aëtius, later Patrician of the West, who managed this operation. They exchanged ambassadors and hostages, the alliance lasting from 401 to 450 and permitting the Romans numerous military victories. The Huns considered the Romans to be paying them tribute, whereas the Romans preferred to view this as payment for services rendered. The Huns had become a great power by the time that Attila came of age during the reign of his uncle Ruga, to the point that Nestorius, the Patriarch of Constantinople, deplored the situation with these words: "They have become both masters and slaves of the Romans".

== Campaigns against the Eastern Roman Empire ==
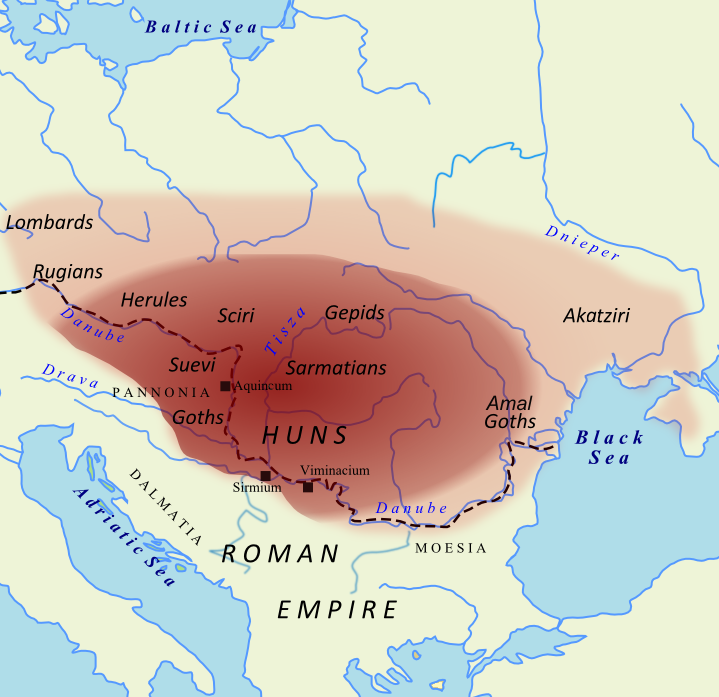
The Empire of the Huns and subject tribes at the time of Attila

The death of Rugila (also known as Rua or Ruga) in 434 left the sons of his brother Mundzuk, Attila and Bleda, in control of the united Hun tribes. At the time of the two brothers' accession, the Hun tribes were bargaining with Eastern Roman Emperor Theodosius II's envoys for the return of several renegades who had taken refuge within the Eastern Roman Empire, possibly Hunnic nobles who disagreed with the brothers' assumption of leadership.

The following year, Attila and Bleda met with the imperial legation at Margus (Požarevac), all seated on horseback in the Hunnic manner, and negotiated an advantageous treaty. The Romans agreed to return the fugitives, to double their previous tribute of 350 Roman pounds (c. 115 kg) of gold, to open their markets to Hunnish traders, and to pay a ransom of eight solidi for each Roman taken prisoner by the Huns. The Huns, satisfied with the treaty, decamped from the Roman Empire and returned to their home in the Great Hungarian Plain, perhaps to consolidate and strengthen their empire. Theodosius used this opportunity to strengthen the walls of Constantinople, building the city's first sea wall, and to build up his border defenses along the Danube.

The Huns remained out of Roman sight for the next few years while they invaded the Sassanid Empire. They were defeated in Armenia by the Sassanids, abandoned their invasion, and turned their attentions back to Europe. In 440, they reappeared in force on the borders of the Roman Empire, attacking the merchants at the market on the north bank of the Danube that had been established by the treaty of 435.

Crossing the Danube, they laid waste to the cities of Illyricum and forts on the river, including (according to Priscus) Viminacium, a city of Moesia. Their advance began at Margus, where they demanded that the Romans turn over a bishop who had retained property that Attila regarded as his. While the Romans discussed the bishop's fate, he slipped away secretly to the Huns and betrayed the city to them.

While the Huns attacked city-states along the Danube, the Vandals (led by Geiseric) captured the Western Roman province of Africa and its capital of Carthage. Africa was the richest province of the Western Empire and a main source of food for Rome. The Sassanid Shah Yazdegerd II invaded Armenia in 441.

The Romans stripped the Balkan area of forces, sending them to Sicily in order to mount an expedition against the Vandals in Africa. This left Attila and Bleda a clear path through Illyricum into the Balkans, which they invaded in 441. The Hunnish army sacked Margus and Viminacium, and then took Singidunum (Belgrade) and Sirmium. During 442, Theodosius recalled his troops from Sicily and ordered a large issue of new coins to finance operations against the Huns. He believed that he could defeat the Huns and refused the Hunnish kings' demands.

Attila responded with a campaign in 443. For the first time (as far as the Romans knew) his forces were equipped with battering rams and rolling siege towers, with which they successfully assaulted the military centers of Ratiara and Naissus (Niš) and massacred the inhabitants. Priscus said "When we arrived at Naissus we found the city deserted, as though it had been sacked; only a few sick persons lay in the churches. We halted at a short distance from the river, in an open space, for all the ground adjacent to the bank was full of the bones of men slain in war."

Advancing along the Nišava River, the Huns next took Serdica (Sofia), Philippopolis (Plovdiv), and Arcadiopolis (Lüleburgaz). They encountered and destroyed a Roman army outside Constantinople but were stopped by the double walls of the Eastern capital. They defeated a second army near Callipolis (Gelibolu).

Theodosius, unable to make effective armed resistance, admitted defeat, sending the Magister militum per Orientem Anatolius to negotiate peace terms. The terms were harsher than the previous treaty: the Emperor agreed to hand over 6,000 Roman pounds (c. 2000 kg) of gold as punishment for having disobeyed the terms of the treaty during the invasion; the yearly tribute was tripled, rising to 2,100 Roman pounds (c. 700 kg) in gold; and the ransom for each Roman prisoner rose to 12 solidi.

Their demands were met for a time, and the Hun kings withdrew into the interior of their empire. Bleda died following the Huns' withdrawal from Byzantium (probably around 445). Attila then took the throne for himself, becoming the sole ruler of the Huns.

== Solitary kingship ==
In 447, Attila again rode south into the Eastern Roman Empire through Moesia. The Roman army, under Gothic magister militum Arnegisclus, met him in the Battle of the Utus and was defeated, though not without inflicting heavy losses. The Huns were left unopposed and rampaged through the Balkans as far as Thermopylae.

Constantinople itself was saved by the Isaurian troops of magister militum per Orientem Zeno and protected by the intervention of prefect Constantinus, who organized the reconstruction of the walls that had been previously damaged by earthquakes and, in some places, to construct a new line of fortification in front of the old. Callinicus, in his Life of Saint Hypatius, wrote:

The barbarian nation of the Huns, which was in Thrace, became so great that more than a hundred cities were captured and Constantinople almost came into danger and most men fled from it. ... And there were so many murders and blood-lettings that the dead could not be numbered. Ay, for they took captive the churches and monasteries and slew the monks and maidens in great numbers.

== In the west ==
The general path of the Hun forces in the invasion of Gaul

In 450, Attila proclaimed his intent to attack the Visigoth kingdom of Toulouse by making an alliance with Emperor Valentinian III. He had previously been on good terms with the Western Roman Empire and its influential general Flavius Aëtius. Aëtius had spent a brief exile among the Huns in 433, and the troops that Attila provided against the Goths and Bagaudae had helped earn him the largely honorary title of magister militum in the west. The gifts and diplomatic efforts of Geiseric, who opposed and feared the Visigoths, may also have influenced Attila's plans.

However, Valentinian's sister was Honoria, who had sent the Hunnish king a plea for help—and her engagement ring—in order to escape her forced betrothal to a Roman senator in the spring of 450. Honoria may not have intended a proposal of marriage, but Attila chose to interpret her message as such. He accepted, asking for half of the western Empire as dowry.

When Valentinian discovered the plan, only the influence of his mother Galla Placidia convinced him to exile Honoria, rather than killing her. He also wrote to Attila, strenuously denying the legitimacy of the supposed marriage proposal. Attila sent an emissary to Ravenna to proclaim that Honoria was innocent, that the proposal had been legitimate, and that he would come to claim what was rightfully his.

Attila interfered in a succession struggle after the death of a Frankish ruler. Attila supported the elder son, while Aëtius supported the younger. (The location and identity of these kings is not known and subject to conjecture.) Attila gathered his vassals—Gepids, Ostrogoths, Rugians, Scirians, Heruls, Thuringians, Alans, Burgundians, among others—and began his march west. In 451, he arrived in Belgica with an army exaggerated by Jordanes to half a million strong.

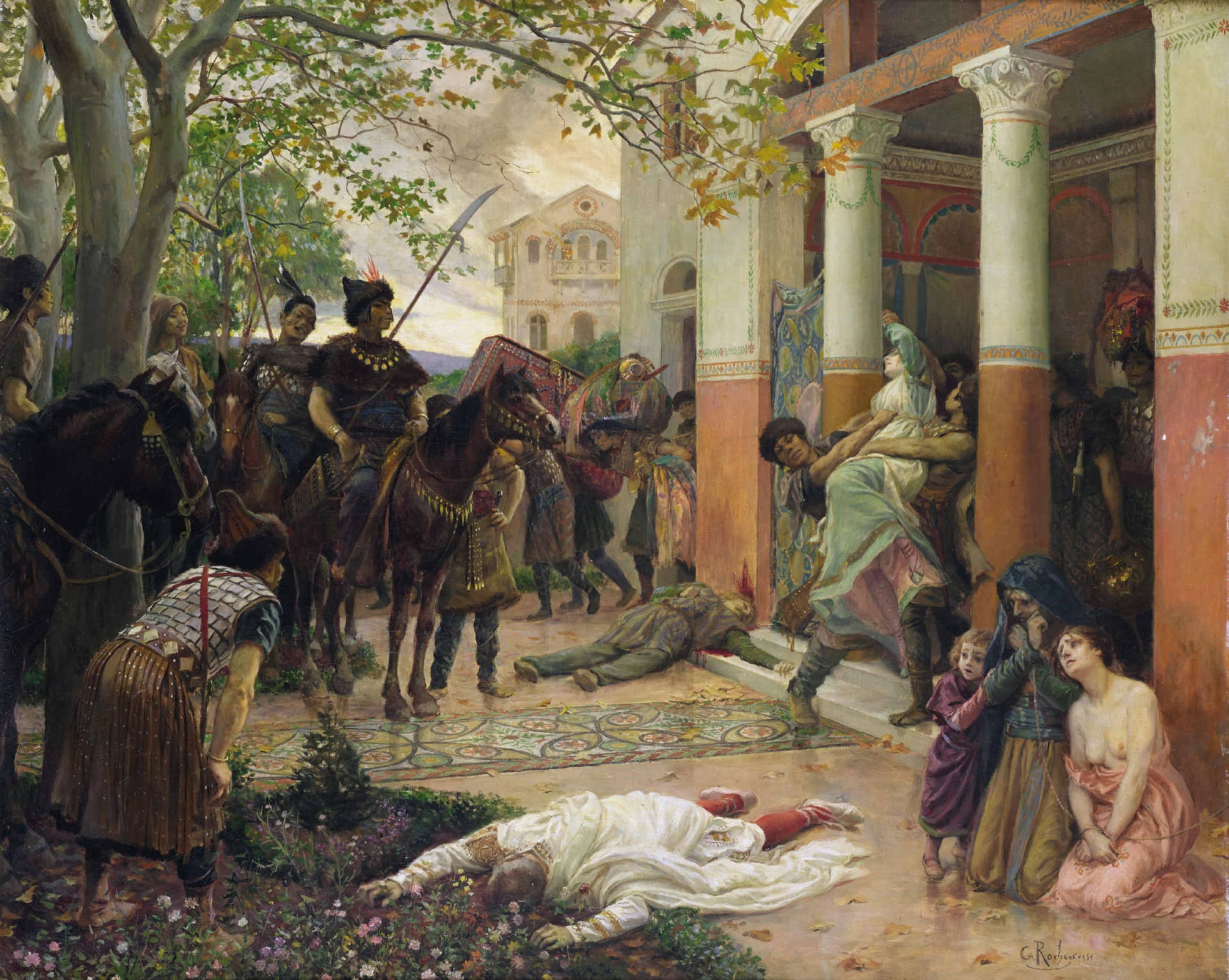
Roman villa in Gaul sacked by Attila's hordes, by French historicist painter Georges Rochegrosse

On April 7, he captured Metz. He also captured Strasbourg. Other cities attacked can be determined by the hagiographic vitae written to commemorate their bishops: Nicasius was slaughtered before the altar of his church in Rheims; Servatus is alleged to have saved Tongeren with his prayers, as Saint Genevieve is said to have saved Paris. Lupus, bishop of Troyes, is also credited with saving his city by meeting Attila in person.

Aëtius moved to oppose Attila, gathering troops from among the Franks, the Burgundians, and the Celts. A mission by Avitus and Attila's continued westward advance convinced the Visigoth king Theodoric I (Theodorid) to ally with the Romans. The combined armies reached Orléans ahead of Attila, thus checking and turning back the Hunnish advance. Aëtius gave chase and caught the Huns at a place usually assumed to be near Catalaunum (modern Châlons-en-Champagne). Attila decided to fight the Romans on plains where he could use his cavalry.

The two armies clashed in the Battle of the Catalaunian Plains, the outcome of which is commonly considered to be a strategic victory for the Visigothic–Roman alliance. Theodoric was killed in the fighting, and Aëtius failed to press his advantage, according to Edward Gibbon and Edward Creasy, because he feared the consequences of an overwhelming Visigothic triumph as much as he did a defeat. From Aëtius's point of view, the best outcome was what occurred: Theodoric died, Attila was in retreat and disarray, and the Romans had the benefit of appearing victorious.

== Invasion of Italy and death ==
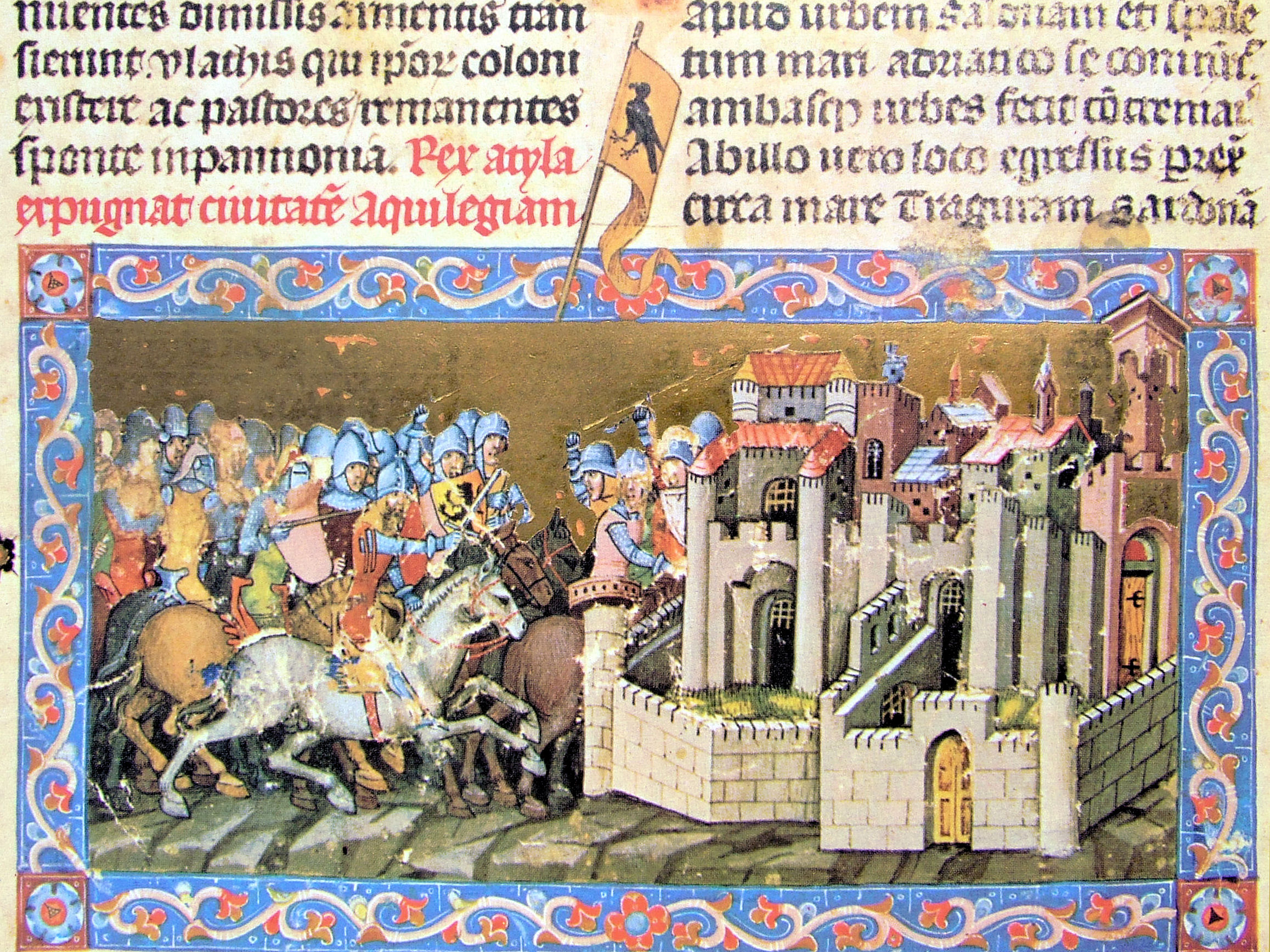
Attila is besieging Aquileia (Illuminated Chronicle, 1358)

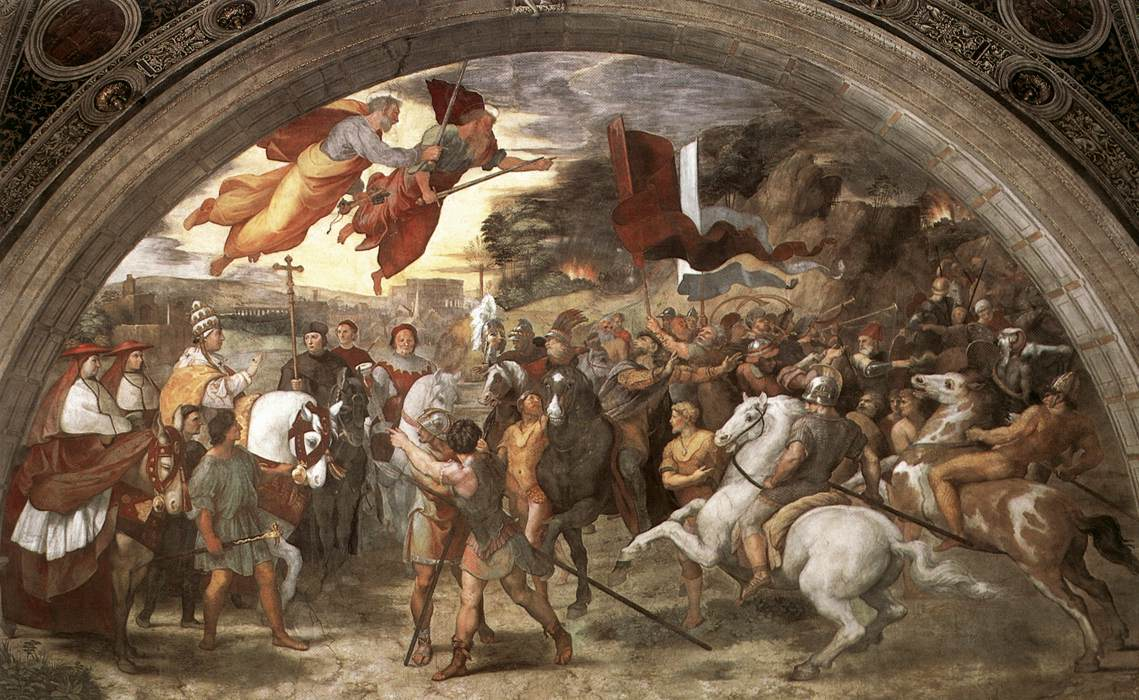
Raphael's The Meeting between Leo the Great and Attila depicts Leo, escorted by Saint Peter and Saint Paul, meeting with the Hun emperor outside Rome.

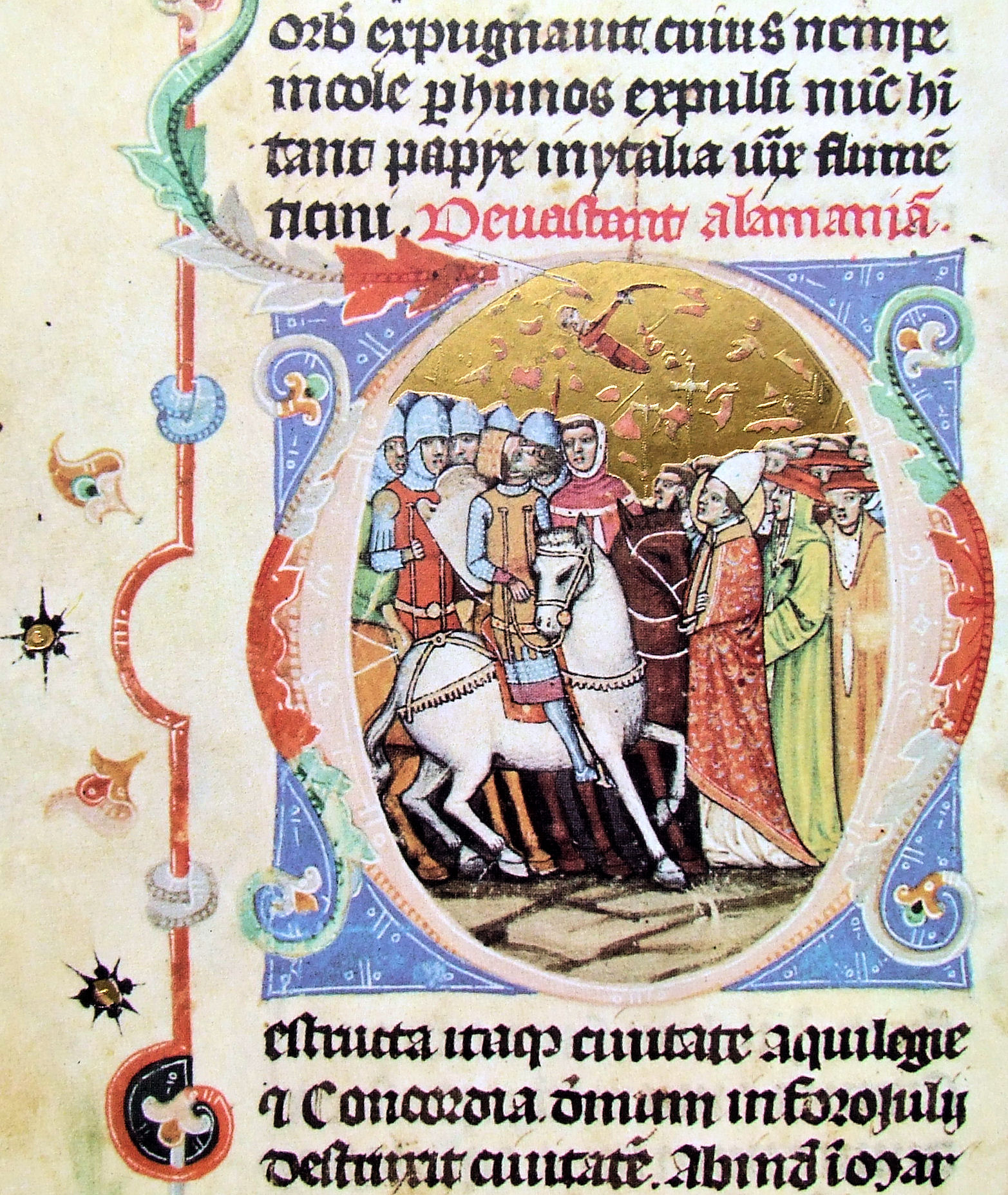
Meeting of Attila with Pope Leo (Illuminated Chronicle, 1358)

Attila returned in 452 to renew his marriage claim with Honoria, invading and ravaging Italy along the way. Communities became established in what would later become Venice as a result of these attacks when the residents fled to small islands in the Venetian Lagoon. His army sacked numerous cities and razed Aquileia so completely that it was afterwards hard to recognize its original site. Aëtius lacked the strength to offer battle, but managed to harass and slow Attila's advance with only a shadow force. Attila finally halted at the River Po. By this point, disease and starvation may have taken hold in Attila's camp, thus hindering his war efforts and potentially contributing to the cessation of invasion.

Emperor Valentinian III sent three envoys, the high civilian officers Gennadius Avienus and Trigetius, as well as Pope Leo I, who met Attila at Mincio in the vicinity of Mantua and obtained from him the promise that he would withdraw from Italy and negotiate peace with the Emperor. Prosper of Aquitaine gives a short description of the historic meeting, but gives all the credit to Leo for the successful negotiation. Priscus reports that superstitious fear of the fate of Alaric gave him pause—as Alaric died shortly after sacking Rome in 410.

Italy had suffered from a terrible famine in 451 and crops were a little better in 452. Attila's devastating invasion of the plains of northern Italy this year did not improve the harvest. To advance on Rome would have required supplies which were not available in Italy, and taking the city would not have improved Attila's supply situation. Therefore, it was more profitable for Attila to conclude peace and retreat to his homeland.

Furthermore, an East Roman force had crossed the Danube under the command of another officer also named Aetius—who had participated in the Council of Chalcedon the previous year—and proceeded to defeat the Huns who had been left behind by Attila to safeguard their home territories. Attila, hence, faced heavy human and natural pressures to retire "from Italy without ever setting foot south of the Po". As Hydatius writes in his Chronica Minora:

The Huns, who had been plundering Italy and who had also stormed a number of cities, were victims of divine punishment, being visited with heaven-sent disasters: famine and some kind of disease. In addition, they were slaughtered by auxiliaries sent by the Emperor Marcian and led by Aetius, and at the same time, they were crushed in their [home] settlements ... Thus crushed, they made peace with the Romans.

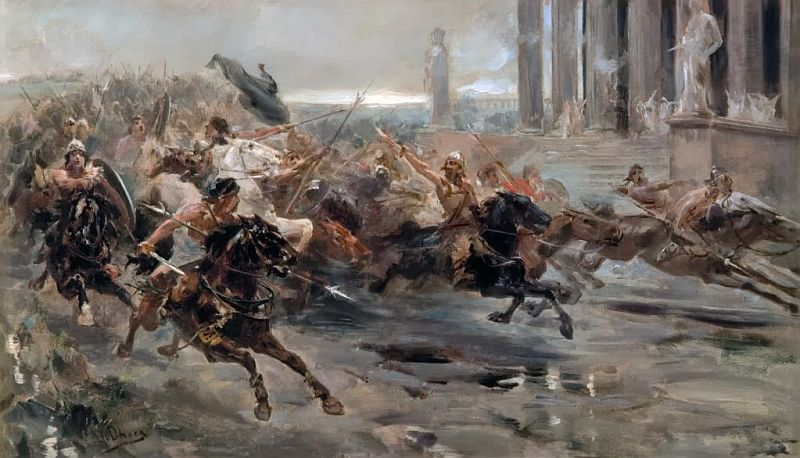
The Huns, led by Attila, invade Italy (Attila, the Scourge of God, by Ulpiano Checa, 1887)

=== Death ===
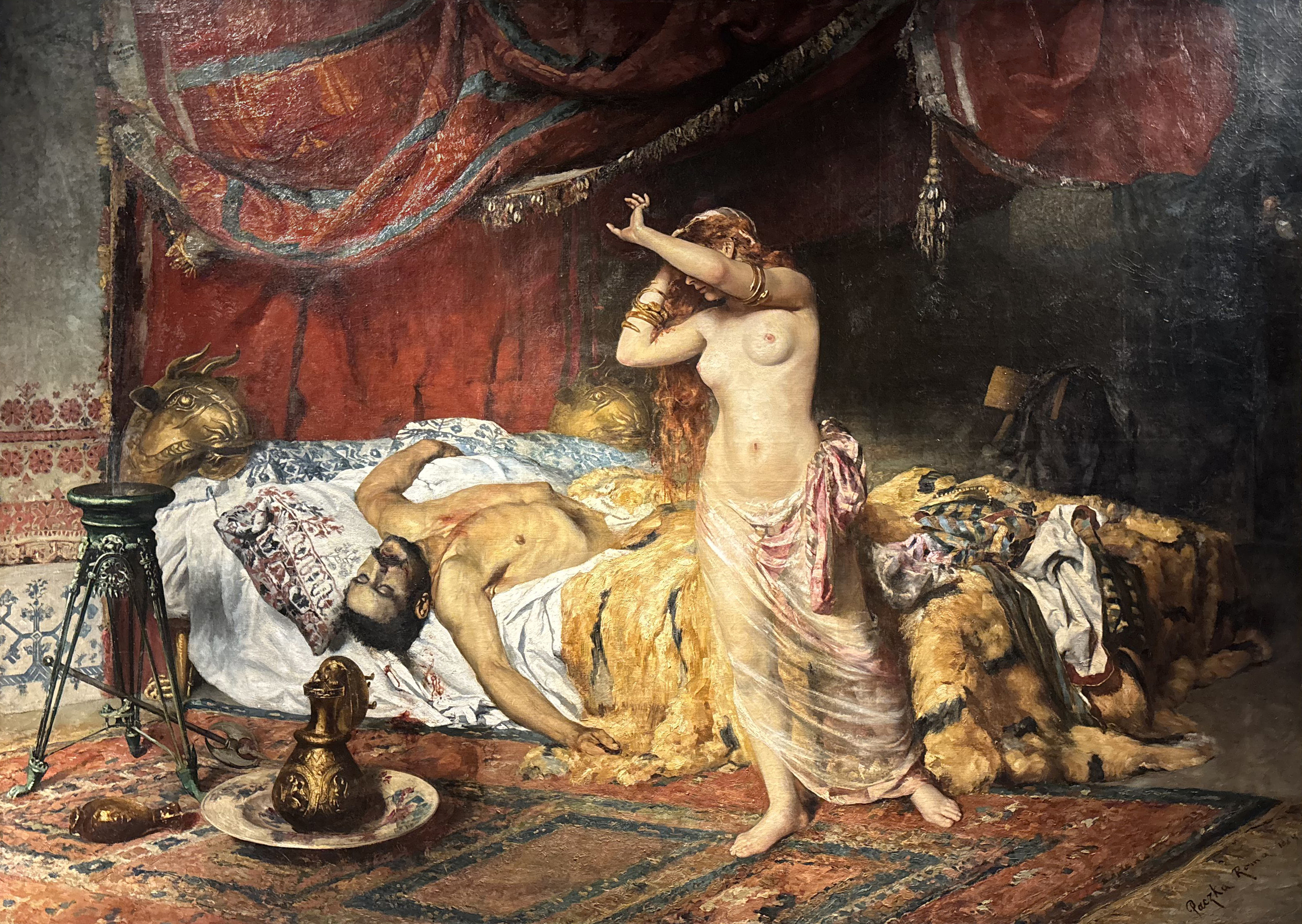
Death of Attila (Ferenc Pazcka, 1884)

In the Eastern Roman Empire, Emperor Marcian succeeded Theodosius II, and stopped paying tribute to the Huns. Attila withdrew from Italy to his palace across the Danube, while making plans to strike at Constantinople once more to reclaim tribute. However, he died in the early months of 453.

The conventional account from Priscus says that Attila was at a feast celebrating his latest marriage, this time to the beautiful young Ildico (the name suggests Gothic or Ostrogoth origins). In the midst of the revels, however, he suffered severe bleeding and died. He may have had a nosebleed and choked to death in a stupor. Or he may have succumbed to internal bleeding, possibly due to ruptured esophageal varices. Esophageal varices are dilated veins that form in the lower part of the esophagus, often caused by years of excessive alcohol consumption; they are fragile and can easily rupture, leading to death by hemorrhage.

Another account of his death was first recorded 80 years after the events by Roman chronicler Marcellinus Comes. It reports that "Attila, King of the Huns and ravager of the provinces of Europe, was pierced by the hand and blade of his wife". One modern analyst suggests that he was assassinated, but most reject these accounts as no more than hearsay, preferring instead the account given by Attila's contemporary Priscus, recounted in the 6th century by Jordanes:

On the following day, when a great part of the morning was spent, the royal attendants suspected some ill and, after a great uproar, broke in the doors. There they found the death of Attila accomplished by an effusion of blood, without any wound, and the girl with downcast face weeping beneath her veil. Then, as is the custom of that race, they plucked out the hair of their heads and made their faces hideous with deep wounds, that the renowned warrior might be mourned, not by effeminate wailings and tears, but by the blood of men. Moreover a wondrous thing took place in connection with Attila's death. For in a dream some god stood at the side of Marcian, Emperor of the East, while he was disquieted about his fierce foe, and showed him the bow of Attila broken in that same night, as if to intimate that the race of Huns owed much to that weapon. This account the historian Priscus says he accepts upon truthful evidence. For so terrible was Attila thought to be to great empires that the gods announced his death to rulers as a special boon.

His body was placed in the midst of a plain and lay in state in a silken tent as a sight for men's admiration. The best horsemen of the entire tribe of the Huns rode around in circles, after the manner of circus games, in the place to which he had been brought and told of his deeds in a funeral dirge in the following manner: "The chief of the Huns, King Attila, born of his sire Mundiuch, lord of bravest tribes, sole possessor of the Scythian and German realms—powers unknown before—captured cities and terrified both empires of the Roman world and, appeased by their prayers, took annual tribute to save the rest from plunder. And when he had accomplished all this by the favor of fortune, he fell, not by wound of the foe, nor by treachery of friends, but in the midst of his nation at peace, happy in his joy and without sense of pain. Who can rate this as death, when none believes it calls for vengeance?"

When they had mourned him with such lamentations, a strava, as they call it, was celebrated over his tomb with great reveling. They gave way in turn to the extremes of feeling and displayed funereal grief alternating with joy. Then in the secrecy of night they buried his body in the earth. They bound his coffins, the first with gold, the second with silver and the third with the strength of iron, showing by such means that these three things suited the mightiest of kings; iron because he subdued the nations, gold and silver because he received the honors of both empires. They also added the arms of foemen won in the fight, trappings of rare worth, sparkling with various gems, and ornaments of all sorts whereby princely state is maintained. And that so great riches might be kept from human curiosity, they slew those appointed to the work—a dreadful pay for their labor; and thus sudden death was the lot of those who buried him as well as of him who was buried.

=== Descendants ===
Attila's sons Ellac, Dengizich and Ernak, "in their rash eagerness to rule they all alike destroyed his empire". They "were clamoring that the nations should be divided among them equally and that warlike kings with their peoples should be apportioned to them by lot like a family estate". Against the treatment as "slaves of the basest condition" a Germanic alliance led by the Gepid ruler Ardaric (who was noted for great loyalty to Attila) revolted and fought with the Huns in Pannonia in the Battle of Nedao of 454 AD. Attila's eldest son Ellac was killed in that battle. Attila's sons "regarding the Goths as deserters from their rule, came against them as though they were seeking fugitive slaves", attacked Ostrogothic co-ruler Valamir (who also fought alongside Ardaric and Attila at the Catalaunian Plains), but were repelled, and some group of Huns moved to Scythia (probably those of Ernak). His brother Dengizich attempted a renewed invasion across the Danube in 468 AD, but was defeated at the Battle of Bassianae by the Ostrogoths. Dengizich was killed by Roman-Gothic general Anagast the following year, after which the Hunnic dominion ended.

Many of Attila's close relatives are known by name, and some even by deeds, but valid genealogical sources are rare, and there seems to be no verifiable way to trace Attila's descendants beyond a few generations. This has not stopped many genealogists from attempting to reconstruct a valid line of descent to various medieval rulers. One of the most credible claims has been that of the Nominalia of the Bulgarian khans for mythological Avitohol and Irnik from the Dulo clan of the Bulgars. The Hungarian Árpád dynasty also claimed to be a direct descendant of Attila. Medieval Hungarian chronicles from the Hungarian royal court like Gesta Hungarorum, Gesta Hunnorum et Hungarorum, Chronicon Pictum, Buda Chronicle, and Chronica Hungarorum claimed that the Árpád dynasty and the Aba clan are the descendants of Attila.

== Later folklore and iconography ==
The name has many variants in several languages: Atli and Atle in Old Norse; Etzel in Middle High German (Nibelungenlied); Ætla in Old English; Attila, Atilla, and Etele in Hungarian (Attila is the most popular); Attila, Atilla, Atilay, or Atila in Turkish; and Adil and Edil in Kazakh or Adil ("same/similar") or Edil ("to use") in Mongolian.

=== Attila and Hun tradition in the medieval Hungarian Royal Court ===
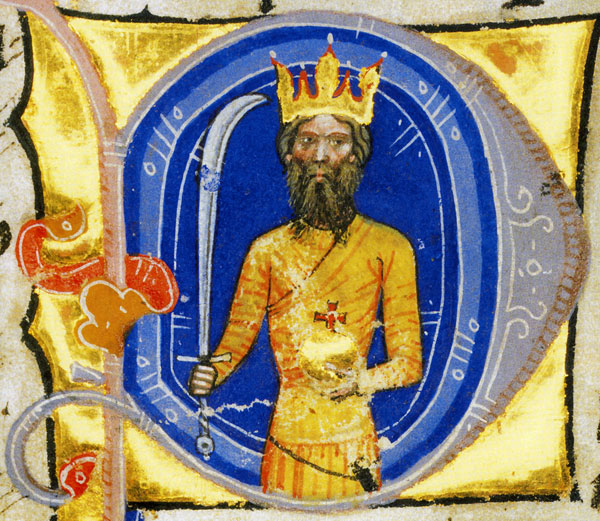
King Attila (Illuminated Chronicle, 1358)

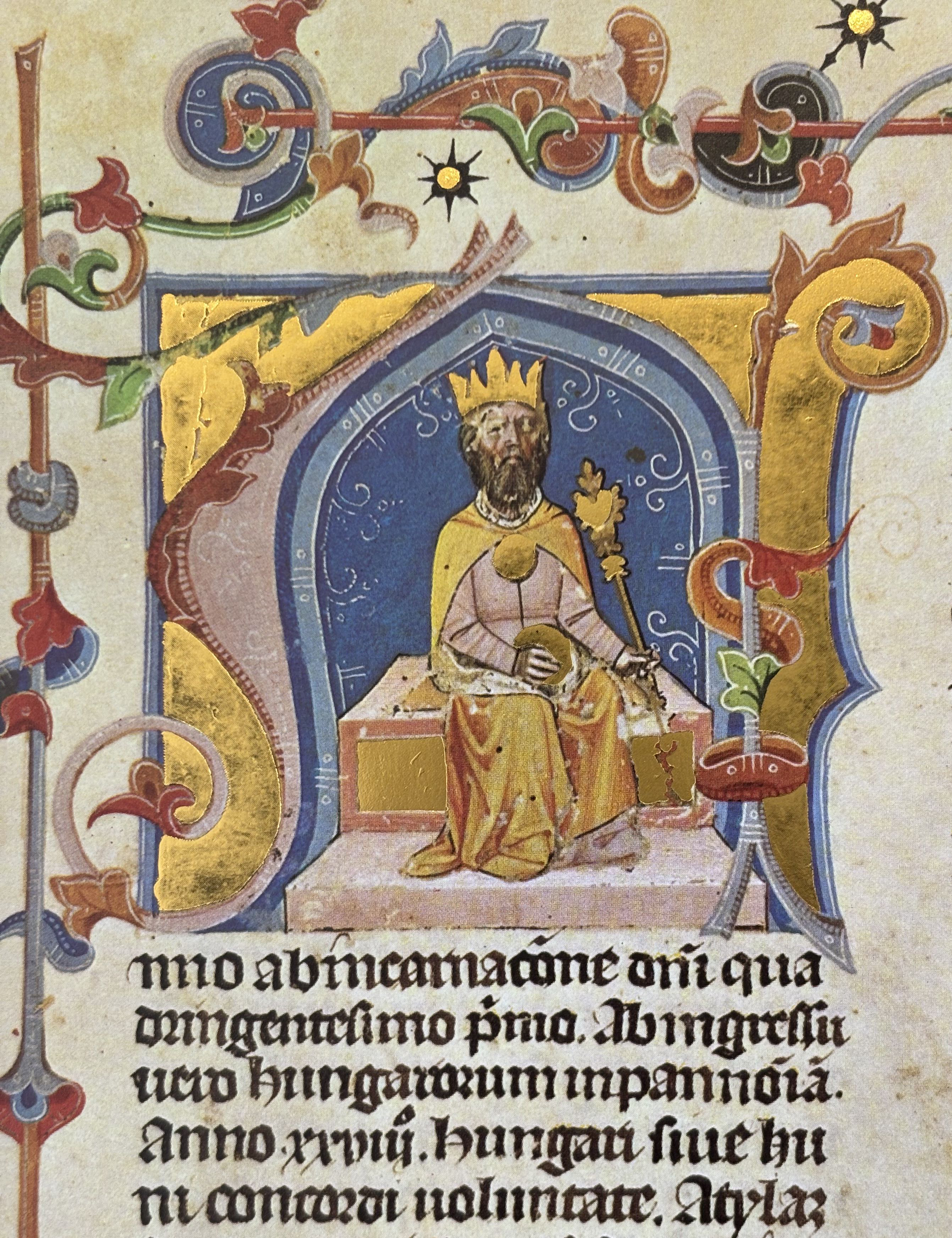
King Attila as the first Hungarian king according to the claim by the Hungarian royal court, the claimed ancestor of the Árpád dynasty (Illuminated Chronicle, 1358)

The basic premise and guiding principle of the Hungarian medieval chronicle tradition about the Huns, i.e. the Hungarians coming out twice from Scythia, was the Hun-Hungarian continuity. The Hungarian state founder royal dynasty, the Árpád dynasty claimed to be a direct descendant of the great Hun leader Attila. Medieval Hungarian chronicles claimed that Grand Prince Árpád of Hungary was the descendant of Attila.

In the 401st year of Our Lord's birth, in the 28th year since the arrival of the Hungarians in Pannonia, according to the custom of the Romans, the Huns, namely the Hungarians exalted Attila as king above themselves, the son of Bendegúz, who was before among the captains. And he made his brother Buda a prince and a judge from the River Tisza to the River Don. Calling himself the King of the Hungarians, the Fear of the World, the Scourge of God: Attila, King of the Huns, Medes, Goths and Danes…

— Mark of Kalt: Chronicon Pictum

Árpád, Grand Prince of the Hungarians says in the Gesta Hungarorum:

The land stretching between the Danube and the Tisza used to belong to my forefather, the mighty Attila.

— Anonymus: Gesta Hungarorum

King Matthias of Hungary (1458–1490) was happy to be described as "the second Attila". The Chronica Hungarorum by Johannes Thuróczy set the goal of glorifying Attila, which was undeservedly neglected, moreover, he introduced the famous "Scourge of God" characterization to the later Hungarian writers, because the earlier chronicles remained hidden for a long time. Thuróczy worked hard to endear Attila, the Hun king with an effort far surpassing his predecessor chroniclers. He made Attila a model for his victorious ruler, King Matthias of Hungary who had Attila's abilities, with this he almost brought "the hammer of the world" to life.

=== Legends about Attila and the sword of Mars ===
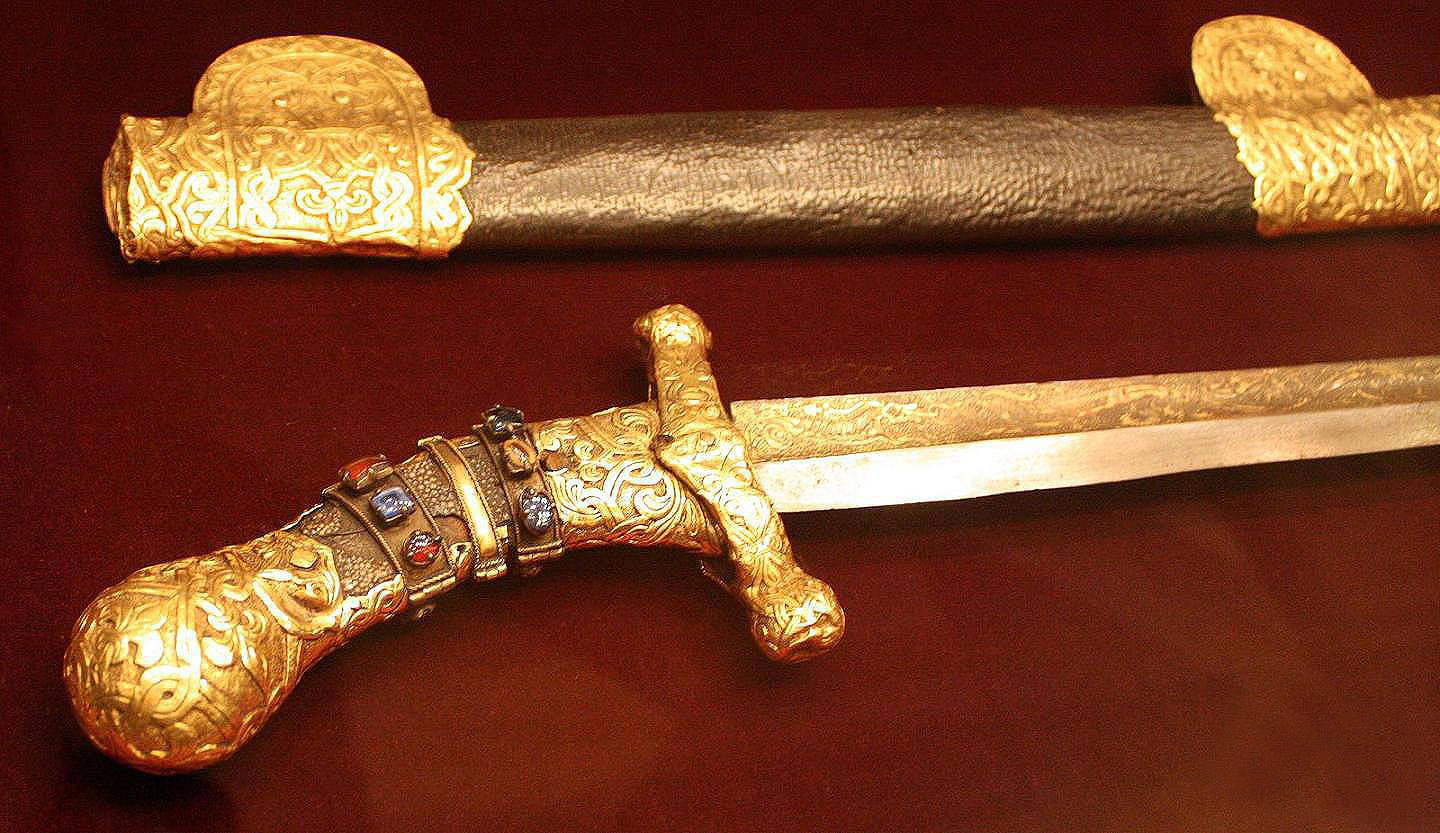
During the reign of King Solomon of Hungary, in the autumn of 1063, Queen Mother Anastasia presented a richly decorated sabre to Otto of Nordheim, Duke of Bavaria. This weapon was esteemed in the Hungarian royal court as the Sword of Attila. According to the Kunsthistorisches Museum, actually a Hungarian sabre from the first half of the 10th century.

Jordanes embellished the report of Priscus, reporting that Attila had possessed the "Holy War Sword of the Scythians", which was given to him by Mars and made him a "prince of the entire world".

The German chronicler Lampert of Hersfeld, in his Annales written up to 1077, recounts that Anastasia, the mother of Solomon, King of Hungary, gave the Sword of Attila to Otto of Nordheim, Duke of Bavaria, as a token of gratitude for helping Solomon ascend to the throne. This sword, a cavalry sabre now in the Kunsthistorisches Museum in Vienna, appears to be the work of Hungarian goldsmiths of the 9th or 10th century.

=== Legends about Attila and his meeting with Pope Leo I ===
An anonymous chronicler of the medieval period represented the meeting of Pope Leo and Atilla as attended also by Saint Peter and Saint Paul, "a miraculous tale calculated to meet the taste of the time." This apotheosis was later portrayed artistically by the Renaissance artist Raphael and sculptor Algardi, whom eighteenth-century historian Edward Gibbon praised for establishing "one of the noblest legends of ecclesiastical tradition".

According to a version of this narrative related in the Chronicon Pictum, a mediaeval Hungarian chronicle, the Pope promised Attila that if he left Rome in peace, one of his successors would receive a holy crown (which has been understood as referring to the Holy Crown of Hungary).

=== Attila in Germanic heroic legend ===
Some histories and chronicles describe Attila as a great and noble king, and he plays major roles in three Norse texts: Atlakviða, Volsunga saga, and Atlamál. The Polish Chronicle represents Attila's name as Aquila.

Frutolf of Michelsberg and Otto of Freising pointed out that some songs as "vulgar fables" and made Theoderic the Great, Attila and Ermanaric contemporaries, when any reader of Jordanes knew that this was not the case. This refers to the so-called historical poems about Dietrich von Bern (Theoderic), in which Etzel (German for Attila) is Dietrich's refuge in exile from his wicked uncle Ermenrich (Ermanaric). Etzel is most prominent in the poems Dietrichs Flucht and the Rabenschlacht. Etzel also appears as Kriemhild's second noble husband in the Nibelungenlied, in which Kriemhild causes the destruction of both the Hunnish kingdom and that of her Burgundian relatives.

=== Early modern and modern reception ===
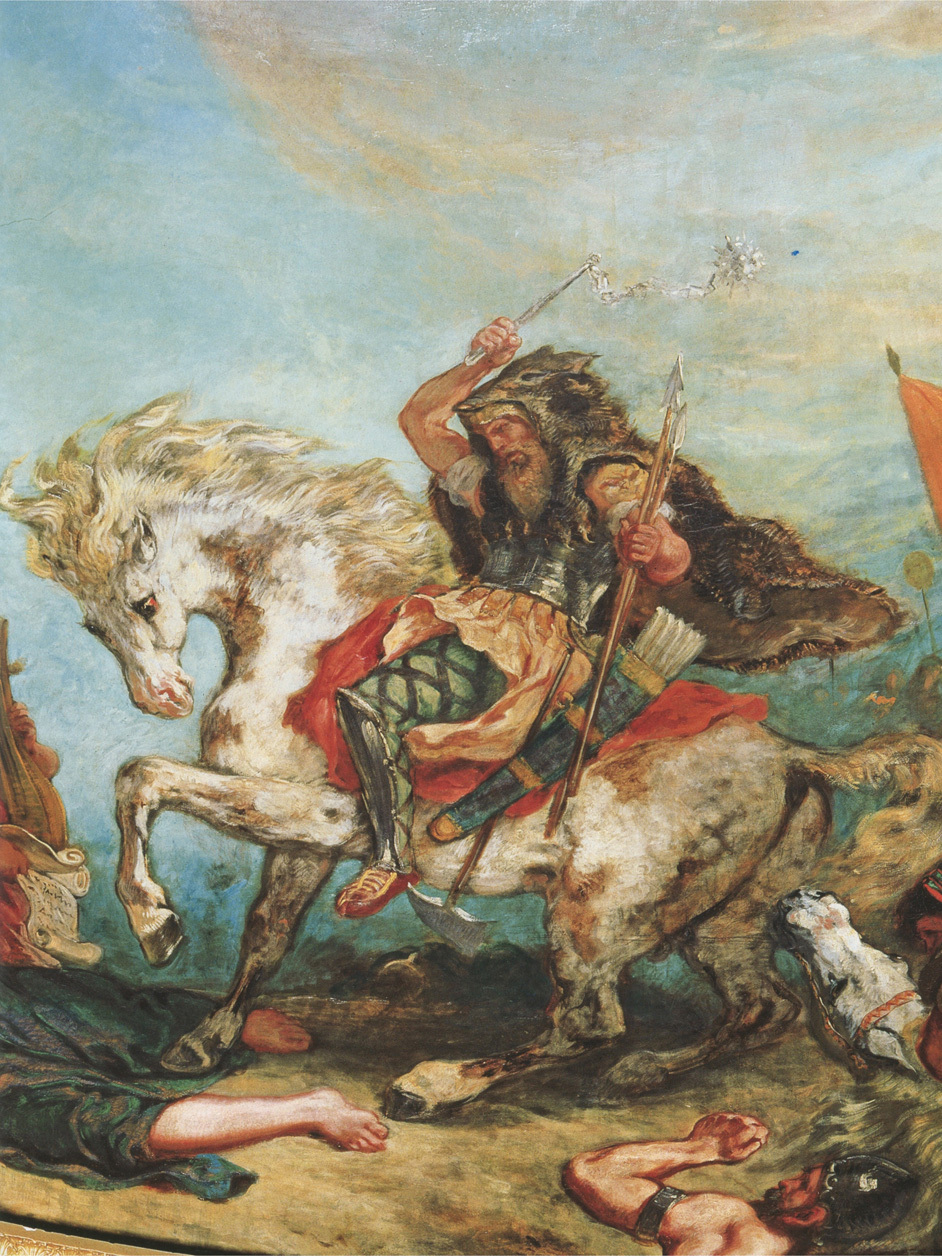
A painting of Attila riding a pale horse, by French Romantic artist Eugène Delacroix (1798–1863)

In 1812, Ludwig van Beethoven conceived the idea of writing an opera about Attila and approached August von Kotzebue to write the libretto. It was, however, never written. In 1846, Giuseppe Verdi wrote the opera, loosely based on episodes in Attila's invasion of Italy.

In World War I, Allied propaganda referred to Germans as the "Huns", based on a 1900 speech by Emperor Wilhelm II praising Attila the Hun's military brutality and might, according to Jawaharlal Nehru's Glimpses of World History. Der Spiegel commented on 6 November 1948, that the Sword of Attila was hanging menacingly over Austria.

American writer Cecelia Holland wrote The Death of Attila (1973), a historical novel in which Attila appears as a powerful background figure whose life and death deeply affect the protagonists, a young Hunnic warrior and a Germanic one.

In modern Hungary and in Turkey, "Attila" and its Turkish variation "Atilla" are commonly used as a male first name. In Hungary, several public places are named after Attila; for instance, in Budapest there are 10 Attila Streets, one of which is an important street behind the Buda Castle. When the Turkish Armed Forces invaded Cyprus in 1974, the operations were named after Attila ("The Attila Plan").

The 1954 Universal International film Sign of the Pagan starred Jack Palance as Attila.

== See also ==
- Onegesius
- Bleda
- Mundzuk
- Attila the Hun in popular culture
- Marosvásárhelyi Attila

== Sources ==
- Frazee, Charles A. (2002). Two Thousand Years Ago: The World at the Time of Jesus. William B. Eerdmans Publishing Company. ISBN 978-0-8028-4805-5.
- Heather, Peter (2010). Empires and Barbarians: The Fall of Rome and the Birth of Europe. Oxford University Press. ISBN 978-0-19-975272-0.
- Heather, Peter (2007). The Fall of the Roman Empire: A New History of Rome and the Barbarians. Oxford University Press. ISBN 978-0-19-532541-6.

Regnal titles
Preceded by Rugila	Ruler of the Huns; 435–453	Succeeded by Ellac
