= Zeno (consul 448) =

Zeno (Greek: Ζήνων; fl. 447–451) was an influential general and politician of the Eastern Roman Empire, of Isaurian origin, who served as magister militum per Orientem, and became consul and patricius.

== Biography ==
Zeno was of Isaurian origin and had a brother, who died before 448.

Between 447 and 451 he was magister militum per Orientem. In 447 he was put at the head of an Isaurian unit and entrusted with the defence of Constantinople from Attila. By this time, he was already magister militum per Orientem (Commander-in-chief of the Eastern army) and was called to defend the capital because all of the other magistri were far away, fighting against the Huns. As a reward for the successful defence of Constantinople, he was appointed consul for the year 448.

In 449 and in 450 he opposed the powerful eunuch Chrysaphius, comes sacrarum largitionum at court, who wanted to obtain Attila's favour. He opposed the marriage of Attila's secretary, Constantius, and Saturninus' daughter, whom he married to one of his supporters, Rufus. It is known that in 450, the imperial court feared Zeno's wrath if he were to learn of the treaty with Attila. In 451 he was raised to the rank of patricius.

According to Damascius, Zeno planned to kill an emperor, in one of two plots organized by pagan officers, but the emperor died after falling from his horse. According to modern historians, Zeno had planned to kill Theodosius II, but the emperor died before the plan could be carried out.

Zeno died during the reign of Marcian (450–457). Among his supporters there was the magister militum Apollonius; Theodoret wrote him two letters.

According to ancient sources, Zeno's prestigious career was the reason why another Isaurian officer, Tarasis, chose the Greek name Zeno when he married into the Imperial family, thus being known as Zeno when he rose to the throne. Some modern historians suggest that Zeno was the father of the emperor, but there is no consensus about this, and other sources suggest that Tarasis was member of Zeno's entourage.

== Popular culture ==
In the 2020 album Songs for Pierre Chuvin by The Mountain Goats, Zeno is referenced in the title of the song "Hopeful Assassins of Zeno".

== Bibliography ==
=== Primary sources ===
- Evagrius Scholasticus, Historia ecclesiastica
- Damascius, Philosophycal History
- Jordanes, Romana
- Priscus, Historia
- Theodoret, Epistles

=== Secondary sources ===
- Martindale, John R., ed. (1980). The Prosopography of the Later Roman Empire: Volume II, AD 395–527. Cambridge: Cambridge University Press. ISBN 0-521-20159-4.

Political offices
Preceded by Ardabur junior, Calepius	Roman consul 448 with Rufius Praetextatus Postumianus	Succeeded by Astyrius, Florentius Romanus Protogenes
