= Marcian =

Eastern Roman emperor from 450 to 457

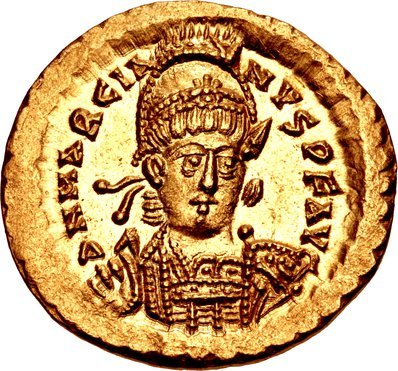
- Solidus of Marcian, marked: d·n· marcianus p·f· aug·

Roman emperor of the East
- Reign: 25 August 450 – 27 January 457
- Predecessor: Theodosius II
- Successor: Leo I
- Western emperors: Valentinian III (450–455); Petronius Maximus (455); Avitus (455–456)
- Born: c. 392; Thrace or Illyria
- Died: 27 January 457 (aged 65); Constantinople (now Istanbul, Turkey)
- Burial: Church of the Holy Apostles
- Spouse: Pulcheria (m. 450, died 453)
- Issue: Marcia Euphemia
Names
- Marcianus
- Dynasty: Theodosian
- Religion: Chalcedonian Christianity

Emperor Marcian

Right-Believing, Emperor
- Honored in: Eastern Orthodox Church
- Feast: 17 February
- Attributes: Imperial attire
- Major works: Convened the Council of Chalcedon

Marcian (/ˈmɑːrʃən/; Latin: Marcianus; Ancient Greek: Μαρκιανός Markianos; c. 392 – 27 January 457) was Roman emperor of the East from 450 to 457. Very little is known of his life before becoming emperor, other than that he was a domesticus (personal assistant) who served under the commanders Ardabur and his son Aspar for fifteen years. After the death of Emperor Theodosius II on 28 July 450, Marcian was made a candidate for the throne by Aspar, who held much influence because of his military power. After a month of negotiations Pulcheria, Theodosius's sister, agreed to marry Marcian. Zeno, a military leader whose influence was similar to Aspar's, may have been involved in these negotiations, as he was given the high-ranking court title of patrician upon Marcian's accession. Marcian was elected and inaugurated on 25 August 450.

Marcian reversed many of the actions of Theodosius II in the Eastern Roman Empire's relationship with the Huns under Attila and in religious matters. Marcian almost immediately revoked all treaties with Attila, ending all subsidy payments to him. In 452, while Attila was raiding Roman Italy, then a part of the Western Roman Empire, Marcian launched expeditions across the Danube into the Great Hungarian Plain, defeating the Huns in their own heartland. This action, accompanied by the famine and plague that broke out in northern Italy, allowed the Western Roman Empire to bribe Attila into retreating from the Italian peninsula.

After Attila's death in 453, Marcian took advantage of the resulting fragmentation of the Hunnic confederation by settling Germanic tribes within Roman lands as foederati ("federates" providing military service in exchange for benefits). Marcian also convened the Council of Chalcedon, which declared that Jesus had two "natures": divine and human. This led to the alienation of the population of the eastern provinces of Syria and Egypt, as many of them were miaphysites, rejecting the new official Christology. Marcian died on 27 January 457, leaving the Eastern Roman Empire with a treasury surplus of seven million solidi coins, an impressive achievement considering the economic ruin inflicted upon the Eastern Roman Empire by the Huns and Theodosius's tribute payments. After his death, Aspar passed over Marcian's son-in-law, Anthemius, and had a military commander, Leo I, elected as emperor.

== Early life ==
Marcian was born in c. 392, in either Thrace or Illyria. The ancient historian John Malalas describes him as being tall and having some sort of foot impediment. Little of Marcian's early life is known. His father had served in the military and at a young age Marcian enlisted at Philippopolis in Thrace. By the time of the Roman–Sassanian War of 421–422, Marcian had likely reached the military rank of tribune—the historian Theophanes the Confessor mentions him commanding a military unit. He did not see action in the war, having become ill in Lycia. There he was cared for by Tatianus, who would be made praefectus urbi (prefect of Constantinople) by Marcian, and Tatianus's brother Iulius. Marcian eventually rose to become the domesticus (personal assistant) of Aspar, the magister militum (commander-in-chief) of the Eastern Roman Empire. Despite being half-Alanic and half-Gothic, Aspar held much influence in the empire. In the early 430s, Marcian served under Aspar in Roman Africa, where he was captured by Vandals. Following the imperial propaganda written during Marcian's rule, Evagrius Scholasticus, Procopius and later authors give a likely false account in which Marcian, while in captivity, met the Vandal king Gaiseric, who predicted he would later become emperor. After his capture, Marcian is not mentioned again until the death of the eastern emperor, Theodosius II.

== Background ==
=== Reign of Theodosius II ===
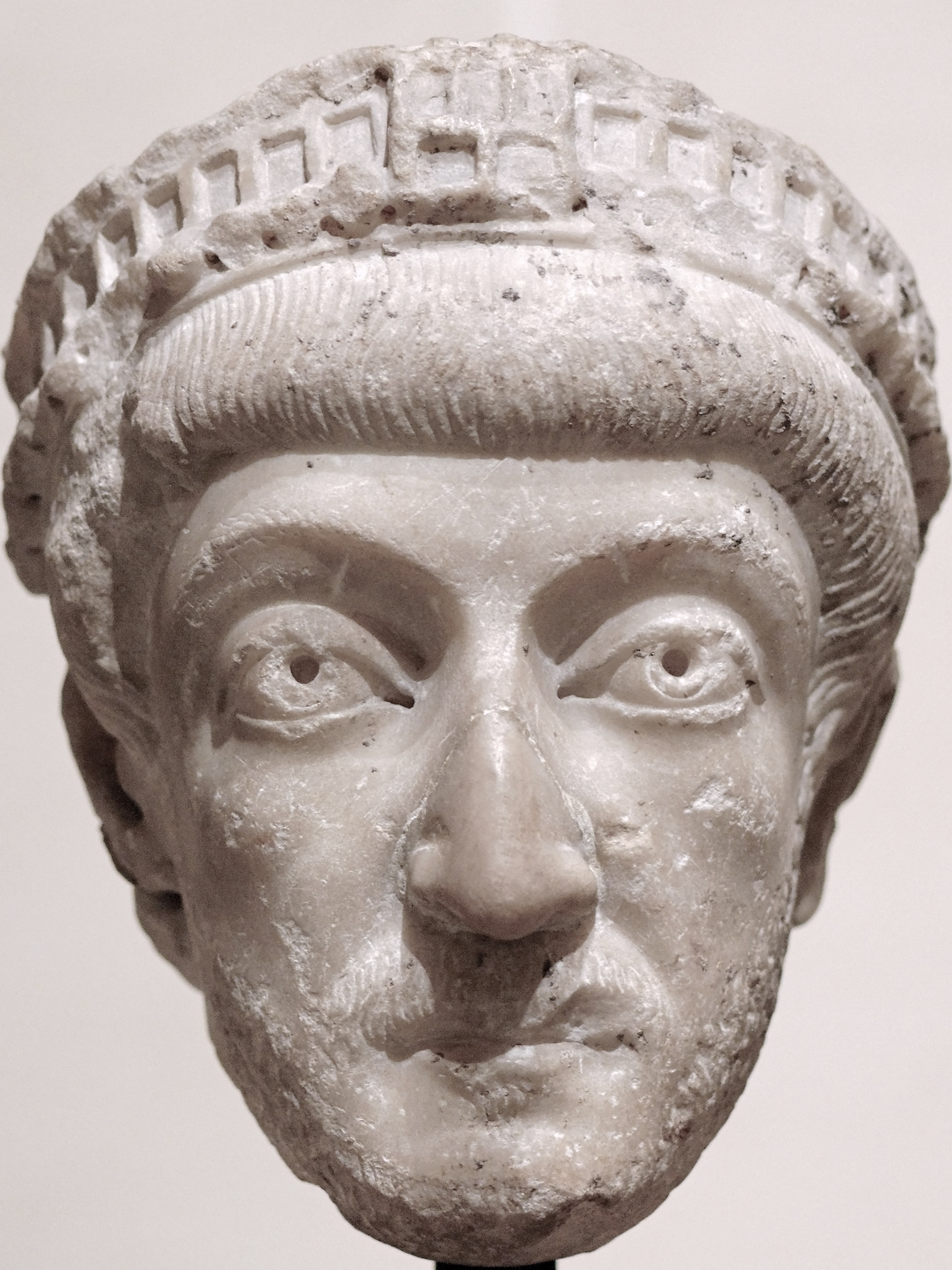
Emperor Theodosius II

The Eastern Roman Empire was plagued by external threats during the reign of Theodosius II. In 429, the Vandals, led by Gaiseric, began to conquer Roman Africa. Theodosius immediately organized a response, sending Aspar and three other commanders to attempt to repel them in the summer of 431. To the north, the Huns, who had customarily attacked the empire whenever its armies were preoccupied, withdrawing as those forces returned, sent ambassadors to Theodosius in 431, demanding tribute. He agreed to their demand to pay 350 pounds (160 kg) of gold each year. In 434, the Eastern Roman armies were still campaigning against the Vandals in Africa, having faced initial defeats and the withdrawal of many of the Western Roman soldiers. In the face of Eastern Roman weakness, the Huns doubled their demand, asking for 700 pounds (320 kg) of gold per year, which Theodosius agreed to. The threat the Huns posed to his weakly protected empire was enough that Theodosius recalled many of his forces from Africa. With large numbers of the Eastern Roman armies home, and Attila, who had just taken power in the Hunnic Confederation, busy campaigning to the north, Theodosius refused to pay the tribute and continued to refuse to until 439.

On 19 October 439, the Vandals defeated the weakened Eastern Roman armies and captured the major city of Carthage. Both the Western and Eastern Roman Empires began preparing a massive counter-offensive, stripping the Balkan provinces of protection. In the spring of 440, 1,100 ships set sail from Constantinople for Africa; sending away so many of the Eastern Roman forces was a huge gamble on Theodosius's part. He was betting the fortified cities along the Danube could delay the Huns long enough for the invasion force to gain a secure foothold in Africa, allowing troops to be withdrawn back to the northern frontier. This gamble worked until 442 when the bishop of Margus led a raiding party into the Huns' territory and desecrated their royal tombs. In response to this desecration, Attila demanded that the bishop be handed over. To ensure his own safety, the bishop struck a deal with Attila, surrendering the city of Margus to him in exchange for his own life. With control of Margus, Attila had a foothold across the Danube, which he aggressively exploited, capturing and destroying the cities of Viminacium, Singidunum, and Sirmium. Theodosius recalled Aspar to Constantinople and launched a counter-attack. After his force was decisively defeated, Theodosius undertook to pay tribute to the Huns every year, which he did until his death in 450.

=== Rise to the throne ===
After Theodosius II died unexpectedly in a riding accident on 28 July 450, the Eastern Roman Empire faced its first succession crisis in 60 years. Theodosius had no sons, nor had he designated a successor. Some later sources state that he willed the throne to Marcian on his deathbed, but this is thought to be propaganda created by Marcian's supporters after his election. Marcian had served Aspar and his father Ardabur loyally for fifteen years. Aspar conspired to have Marcian elected and was able to negotiate with other powerful figures to have him made the emperor, despite his relative obscurity. There was a one-month interregnum where negotiations for the succession took place, one of which was with Pulcheria, Theodosius II's sister, who agreed to marry Marcian; it is thought that Pulcheria agreed to marry Marcian on the condition that he would abandon Theodosius II's religious policies and convoke a Church council. Their marriage helped to legitimize Marcian's rule, as Pulcheria's family, the Theodosian dynasty, had direct ties to the throne. Despite being married to Marcian, Pulcheria kept the vow of virginity she had made in 413, at age 14, during her three years of marriage to him.

Historian Doug Lee proposes that negotiations were also needed between Aspar and Flavius Zeno, who was in a similar position of military power. Zeno was given the prestigious rank of patrician upon Marcian's ascension in 450, suggesting a deal whereby Zeno was rewarded for supporting Marcian instead of claiming the throne for himself; Zeno would ultimately die within a year of Marcian's accession. Aspar's son, Ardabur, was promoted to command the army of the Prefecture of the East as the new magister militum per Orientem, soon after Marcian's accession.

Marcian was elevated on 25 August 450, and Pulcheria's agreement to marry him likely boosted Marcian's legitimacy further. Like his successor Leo I, he was proclaimed emperor by the army at the Hebdomon. Marcian took the regnal name of Imperator Caesar Flavius Marcianus Augustus upon his coronation. The election of Marcian in 450 resulted in large changes to eastern imperial policy. Chrysaphius, the eunuch and spatharios (guard of the imperial chambers), who had exercised much influence over Theodosius, was either murdered or executed. Both Pulcheria and Zeno were opposed to Chrysaphius's influence, which may have motivated Marcian's actions. Marcian took a tougher stance against the Huns and a more direct role in ecclesiastical affairs. Byzantist Constance Head considers Marcian to be "an independent-minded emperor." Lee states that Marcian "can appear as a stronger figure than many other fifth-century incumbents of the imperial office", but notes that "Flavius Zeno and Pulcheria had both been opponents of Chrysaphius, so the changes may be more a reflection of their influence."

== Reign ==
=== Conflict with the Huns ===
A map of Europe in A.D. 451, showing the Hunnic confederation under Attila with a name, and the Roman Empire in purple

Almost immediately after becoming emperor, Marcian revoked Theodosius's treaties with Attila and proclaimed the end of subsidies. He stated that he might grant gifts if Attila was friendly, but Attila would be repelled if he attempted to raid the Eastern Roman Empire. At this time Attila was preparing to invade the Western Roman Empire, under the guise of helping Emperor Valentinian III against the Visigoths. Attila reacted angrily to Marcian's proposal, demanding tribute, but did not alter his invasion plans. He led his horde from Pannonia in spring 451 into the Western Roman Empire. Flavius Aetius, who was the supreme commander of the Western Roman army as Comes et Magister Utriusque Militiae, organized a defense and called upon the Visigoths, Franks, Burgundians, Alans, Saxons, Celtic Armoricans, and other tribal groups numbering about 60,000 to aid him. Attila's forces were made up of Gepids, Alans, Sciri, Heruli, Rugians, along with some Franks, Burgundians, and Ostrogoths.

Attila sacked Metz and attempted a siege of Orléans, before meeting Aetius's forces at the Battle of the Catalaunian Plains, in northeast Gaul. This battle involved around 100,000 men and resulted in very large losses on both sides. After the battle, Attila retreated to the Great Hungarian Plain, and Aetius dismissed his coalition of tribes, sending them back to their own territories. In spring 452, Attila again launched a raid into Italy, which was almost entirely undefended. He was likely motivated by a desire for revenge, along with a need to raid to stabilize his tribal state, which was dependent upon raiding for loot and resources. Attila captured the city of Aquileia after a long and difficult siege, and sacked it. He then raided across northern Italy, taking Mediolanum (Milan) and other important cities. There was much fear that Attila would attack Rome itself, the walls of which were weaker than those of some cities he had already captured. During this period, other than cutting his lines of communication and harassing his rear forces, Aetius did not launch a direct attack on Attila.

Despite the plunder he now had from capturing Aquileia, Milan, and other cities, Attila was quickly placed in a precarious situation, because of the actions of both Eastern and Western Rome. In Italy, he was seriously lacking in funds, having not received subsidies from either Eastern or Western Rome for two years. Constant warfare had depleted his forces. As well, Attila's homeland was threatened by the Eastern Empire which, despite the punitive raids he ordered, took the offensive against the Great Hungarian Plain in mid-452, attacking across the Danube and inflicting a defeat upon the Huns. The area attacked by the Eastern Romans was home to Ostrogoths and Gepids, two groups bitterly opposed to Hunnic rule, and was the breadbasket of the Hunnic Empire. The loss of food supply from Attila's own land coupled with a famine that Italy was suffering at the time, along with a plague that followed it, placed yet more strain upon Attila, allowing the Western Roman Empire to bribe him into retreating to his homeland. After returning to the Great Hungarian Plain, he threatened to invade the Eastern Empire the following spring and conquer it entirely. Marcian and Aspar ignored his threats. They reasoned, based upon the previous treaties that Attila had broken, that he could not be permanently deterred even by tons of gold. The pair believed the gold would be better spent building up armies, not appeasing threats. Also, the rich Asian and African provinces, which were protected behind Constantinople, were secure enough to allow the Eastern Empire to retake any European provinces it might lose. This campaign never came to fruition, as Attila died unexpectedly in 453, either from hemorrhaging or alcoholic suffocation, after celebrating a marriage to one of his many wives. After his death, his tribal confederation rapidly fell apart, starting first with rebellions of the Ostrogoths.

This fragmentation allowed the Eastern Empire to resume its policy of playing off barbarians against each other, to stop any one tribe from becoming too powerful. It is almost certain that the Gepid king Ardaric came to an agreement with Marcian. Ardaric had formed a coalition of the Rugians, Sciri, Heruli, and his own Gepids, which he led against the remaining Hunnic confederation. Ardaric, alongside the Ostrogoth leaders Theodemir, Valamir and Videmir, decisively defeated Attila's oldest son, Ellac, at the Battle of Nedao in 455, where he was slain. After this battle, the Hunnic confederation could no longer sustain the cohesion of its previous days, although they still remained prominent. In the wake of the reduced power of the Hunnic Empire, Marcian accepted the Ostrogoths, who had established themselves in Pannonia Prima and Valeria—nominally two Western Roman provinces—as foederati. This marked the continuation of the tacit abandonment of a rigid Danube barrier, which had previously been manned by Roman laeti, barbarians settled directly in Roman land in exchange for military service. For some time before Marcian, the laeti had been replaced by foederati, although the distinction between the two was increasingly breaking down. Marcian's successors would grant the status of foederati to multiple peoples and ceding them lands in the recovered European provinces: the Rugians in eastern Thrace, Sciri in Lower Moesia and Scythia, Gepids in Dacia. This network of subject peoples, who were generally reliable and manageable, was beneficial to the Eastern Empire. The tribal peoples generally kept each other's power in check without Roman intervention. They could also be induced to serve the empire against its enemies by way of gifts, subsidies, and treaties. With the Hunnic empire's diminished might after the death of Attila, Marcian enjoyed a relatively peaceful reign, although he won some small campaigns against the Saracens in Syria and against the Blemmyes in Egypt.

=== Religious policy ===
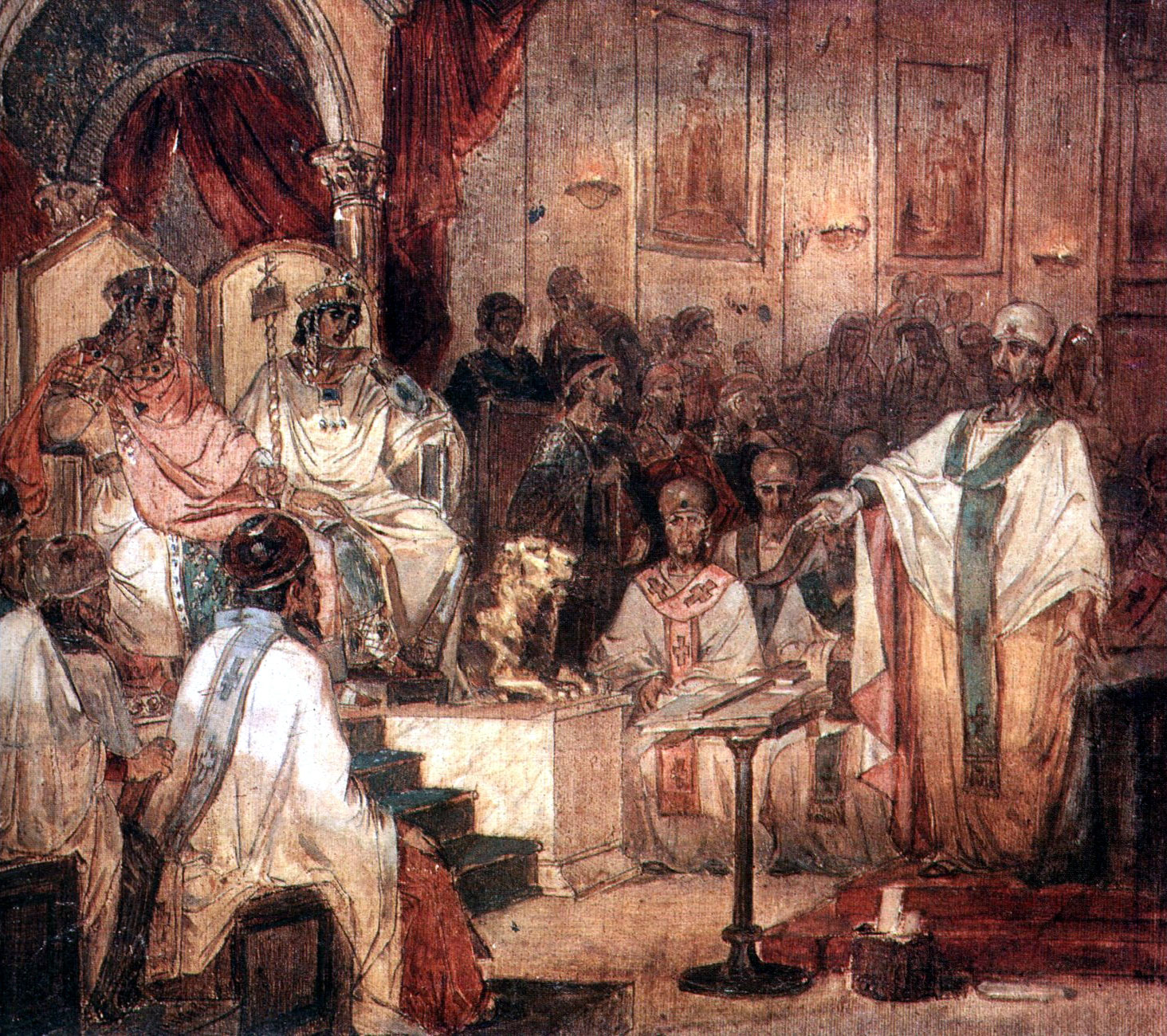
Fourth Ecumenical Council of Chalcedon, 1876 painting by Vasily Surikov

During the 5th century, a central religious issue was the debate concerning how the human and divine nature of Jesus Christ were associated, following the Arian controversy. The School of Alexandria, including theologians such as Athanasius, asserted the equality of Christ and God, and therefore focused upon the divinity of Christ. The School of Antioch, including theologians such as Theodore of Mopsuestia, determined not to lose the human aspect of Christ, focused upon his humanity.

Shortly before Marcian became emperor, the Second Council of Ephesus was held in 449. The council stated that Jesus had one divine united nature, a position called monophysitism; this was rejected by the Pope and the Patriarch of Constantinople because of disputes on the matter of Christology, as the Pope and Patriarch of Constantinople saw the belief in monophysitism as heretical.

To repudiate the Second Council of Ephesus, Marcian convened a new council of the imperial church, deemed to pass universally respected canons, in 451. Pulcheria may have influenced this decision or even made the convention of a council a requirement during her negotiations with Aspar to marry Marcian. The council was to take place near Constantinople so that the government could watch the proceedings closely. Initially, it was to be held at the city of Nicaea, which held enormous religious importance to the early church, as it was the site of its first council, the First Council of Nicaea in 325. However, Marcian successfully requested the transfer of the location to Chalcedon. This was closer to Constantinople and would allow him to respond quickly to any events along the Danube frontier. The Council of Chalcedon met in October 451. About 500 bishops attended it, most of them Eastern Roman, although two African bishops and two Papal legates sent by Pope Leo I attended. This council condemned the Second Council of Ephesus and agreed that Jesus had a divine nature (physis) and a human nature, united in one person (hypostasis), "without confusion, change, division, or separation."

The council also agreed to condemn the Coptic Pope Dioscorus I of Alexandria, who had overseen the Second Council of Ephesus, and revoke the condemnations of Ibas of Edessa and Theodoret, which had taken place during this council. The council also repeated the importance of the See of Constantinople, placing it firmly in second place behind the See of Rome, and giving it the right to appoint bishops in the Eastern Roman Empire, over the objection of Pope Leo I; the Patriarchs of Alexandria also objected to the elevation of the See of Constantinople. The council ended in November 451, after which Marcian issued numerous edicts confirming the outcomes of the council; showing that the outcome of the council was not universally accepted. One such edict ordered the repression of Eutychianists, who did not believe in the hypostatic union of the two natures of Jesus, barring them from holding state offices, forbidding them from criticizing the Council of Chalcedon, and ordering their literature, along with that of the Nestorians, to be burned.

The anti-Miaphysite resolutions of the council led to a large increase in civil disruption in the eastern provinces of Syria and Egypt, where the majority of the population was Miaphysitic. Several violent revolts were put down with military force after significant bloodshed, in Jerusalem, Alexandria, and Antioch; as well as sending the military to suppress monks in Palestine and placing troops in Alexandria to ensure the installation of Proterius of Alexandria, who was to replace the deposed Pope Dioscorus I. According to the Byzantist Alexander Vasiliev, even after these revolts were put down, the popular dissatisfaction with the state church among the Miaphysite and Nestorian population remained, as the eastern provinces became increasingly convinced of their need for independence from the Eastern Roman Empire. Vasiliev states that this would lead to long-lasting disloyalty toward the Eastern Roman government among the eastern provinces, ultimately facilitating the loss of these provinces to the Sassanians and later to the Arabs. Another result of the council and the subsequent edicts was that many Christians who disagreed with the council, including many Nestorians, migrated to the Sassanian Empire. The separation of the Miaphysites from the churches accepting Chalcedonian doctrine would be made final after the failed attempts of reconciliation under Emperor Justinian I (r. 527–565), the Miaphysites splitting the Oriental Orthodox Churches from the main body of Christians.

Marcian also funded Pulcheria's extensive building projects until her death in July 453. All of them focused on the construction of religious buildings, including the Church of St. Mary of Blachernae and the Hodegon Monastery. Marcian was compared to both Paul the Apostle and the Biblical king David, by the legates at the Council of Chalcedon.

=== Economic and legal policy ===
At the beginning of Marcian's reign, the Eastern Roman treasury was almost bankrupt, the result of the huge tributes paid to Attila by Theodosius. Marcian reversed this near bankruptcy, not by levying new taxes, but by cutting expenditure. Upon his accession, he declared a remission of all debts owed to the state. Marcian attempted to improve the efficiency of the state in multiple ways. He laid out legal reforms in his novels, or codes of law, containing 20 laws, many of which were targeted at reducing the corruption and abuses of office that had existed during the reign of Theodosius; five of which are preserved in full.

Marcian mandated that the office of praetorship (officer in charge of public games and works) could only be given to senators who resided in Constantinople, attempted to curb the practice of selling administrative offices, and decreed that consuls should be responsible for the maintenance of Constantinople's aqueducts. He repealed the follis, a tax on senators' property that amounted to seven pounds of gold per annum. Marcian removed the financial responsibilities of the consuls and praetors, held since the time of the Roman Republic, to fund public sports and games or give wealth to the citizens of Constantinople, respectively. He further decreed that only a vir illustris (a high-ranking man) could hold either office. He also partially repealed a marriage law enacted by Constantine I, which decreed that a man of senatorial status could not marry a slave, freedwoman, actress, or woman of no social status (humilis), which had been created in an attempt to preserve the purity of the senatorial class. Marcian adjusted this law by declaring that the law should not exclude a woman of good character, regardless of her social status or wealth. By the time of his death, Marcian's shrewd cutting of expenditures and his avoidance of large-scale wars left the Eastern Roman treasury with a surplus of 100,000 pounds (45,000 kg) of gold.

In 451, Marcian decreed that anyone who performed pagan rites would lose their property and be condemned to death and that no pagan temples, which had previously been closed, could be reopened. To ensure this law was implemented, he set a penalty of 50 pounds (23 kg) of gold for any judge, governor or official who did not enforce the law.

=== Politics ===
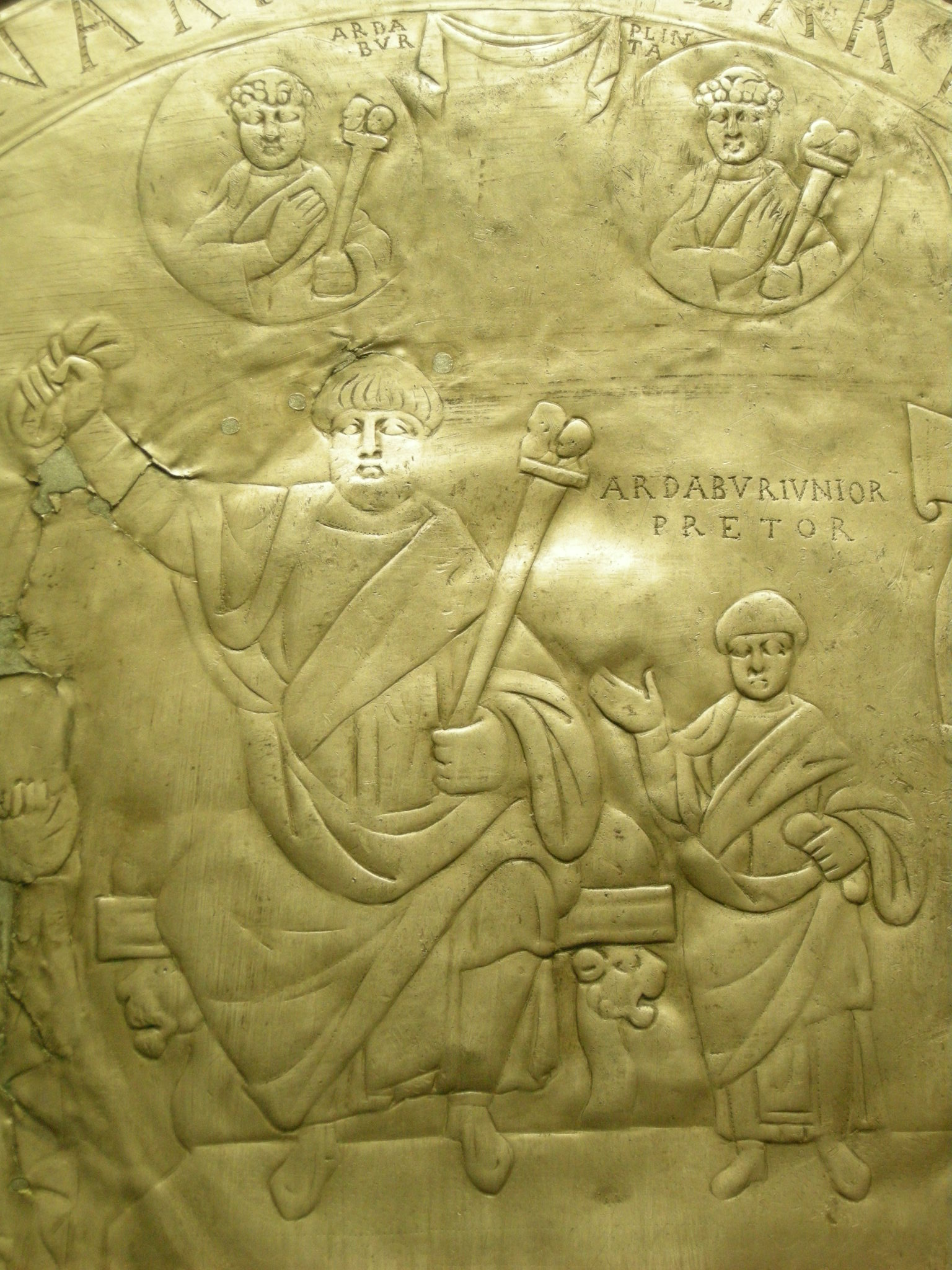
A detail of the Missorium of Aspar, depicting Aspar and his elder son Ardabur (c. 434).

When Marcian became emperor, he was influenced by Flavius Zeno, Pulcheria, and Aspar. Flavius Zeno died soon after Marcian ascended the throne, possibly as early as the end of 451, and Pulcheria died in July 453, leaving Aspar as the only major influence in the court of the Eastern Roman Empire. This influence was enhanced by the promotion of his son Ardabur to magister militum per Orientem. It is unknown if Aspar and Ardabur influenced Marcian's policies directly, but if so, they were extremely careful to avoid upsetting the ruling elites of Constantinople. Despite Aspar's great influence, the Eastern Roman elites retained much of their anti-barbarian sentiment. Marcian's principal advisors were Pulcheria, Euphemius the magister officiorum (master of offices), Palladius the praetor, and Anatolius of Constantinople. In 453, Marcian had his daughter from a previous marriage, Marcia Euphemia, marry Anthemius, an aristocrat and talented general.

Marcian patronized the Blues, who were one of the two main circus teams, the other being the Greens. The two teams had become more like political parties than sports teams by his time, wielding large influence in the empire; both vied for power. After the Greens responded angrily to his patronage, Marcian censured them, forbidding any of them to hold any public office for three years. Marcian's patronage of the Blues may have had personal motivations, as the once powerful Chrysaphius had been favorable to the Greens.

=== Foreign relations ===
The Armenian king Vardan II Mamikonian, who was leading a revolt against the Sassanian Empire, sent an embassy to Theodosius in 450, composed of his brother Hmayeak Mamikonian, along with Atom Gnuni, Vardan Amatuni, and Meruzhan Artsruni, to ask for assistance. Theodosius received it favorably. Any plans were cut short by his death and the accession of Marcian. Marcian was counseled by the diplomat Anatolius and patricius Florentius not to make war with the Sassanians, as it would engulf a large amount of the Eastern Roman military resources, and thus Marcian did not agree to help them.

King Gubazes I of Lazica—a Caucasian state in theory under Eastern Roman suzerainty—was attempting to form an alliance with the Sassanians to break free of Roman control in 456. Marcian's troops invaded Lazica and restored Roman rule. In 455, Marcian banned the export to barbarian tribes of weapons and the tools used to manufacture them.

=== Relationship with the Western Roman Empire ===
Marcian was elected without any consultation with the Western Roman Emperor Valentinian III, a clear indication of further separation between the Eastern and Western Roman Empires than before his reign. Valentinian would later recognize Marcian as the Eastern Roman Emperor, although the date of this recognition is disputed; Lee states that Valentinian recognized Marcian in March 452, whereas historian Timothy E. Gregory states that Marcian was recognized by Valentinian on 30 March 451. Marcian's appointment marked a further stage of separation between the Eastern and Western Roman Empires. One source, John of Antioch's Excerpta de insidiis, even suggest that Valentinian would have attempted to depose Marcian, but for Aetius' opposition. Valentinian also did not recognize the Eastern Roman consuls for 451 or 452. The Western Roman chronicler Hydatius suggests that Marcian made Eastern Roman troops available to Valentinian to repel the Huns, confusingly led by a man named Aetius, which may simply be a muddling of Aetius's campaign against Attila and Marcian's campaign against the Huns on the Danube.

When Marcian granted part of Pannonia to the Ostrogoths, and the Tisza region to the Gepids, he was accused of encroaching upon the border of Western Roman land. Marcian avoided involving himself with the affairs of the Western Roman Empire when possible. When the Vandals sacked Rome in 455, after Petronius Maximus assassinated Valentinian III and broke an engagement treaty with the Vandals, Marcian did not respond violently, possibly because of the influence of Aspar. He merely sent an envoy demanding that the Vandals return the Dowager Empress, Licinia Eudoxia and her daughters by Valentinian III, Placidia and Eudocia. A likely false account is given that Marcian, while captured by the Vandals in his youth, was shaded by an eagle while the other prisoners suffered the hot sun. According to this account, the Vandal King Gaiseric recognized that Marcian would later be emperor. In exchange for being released, he made Marcian pledge not to attack the Vandals should he become emperor. (Note: Propaganda involving the story of an eagle blocking the sun, and another figure recognizing they would be emperor, was used by both Byzantine emperors Philippicus and Basil I.) This account originates from Priscus, who served as an advisor to Marcian's confidant, Euphemius. Because of Euphemius's influence over foreign policy, some historians, such as Edward Arthur Thompson, have suggested that this account was a part of official imperial propaganda, which was generated to excuse Marcian's lack of retribution towards the Vandals, and quell any discontent. Marcian made several diplomatic attempts to have the prisoners returned, before finally beginning to plan an invasion of the Vandal's territory shortly before his death. The historian Frank Clover has suggested that this sudden reversal of policy was caused by the marriage of Eudocia to Huneric, the son of Gaiseric, which led to such pressure from Eastern Roman elites that Marcian was forced to begin preparations for war to ensure the return of the hostages. Around this time, Marcian made peace with Lazica, which would allow him to direct his attention elsewhere. The East Roman historian Theodorus Lector speaks of Marcian's sudden reversal of policy, and Evagrius Scholasticus, a Roman historian writing a century after the event, states that the Vandals released Licinia Eudoxia, Placidia, and Eudocia to Marcian after he threatened them with war, in either late 456 or early 457.

Marcian did not recognize any Western Emperor after Valentinian, denying Petronius Maximus, now Western Emperor, when he sent an embassy requesting it, and similarly refusing to recognize Avitus, who succeeded Maximus. Marcian's exact treatment of Avitus is debated. The Roman historian Hydatius states that in 455 Avitus sent ambassadors to Marcian "for the sake of unanimity of power," and that, "Marcian and Avitus make use of Roman power in concord". The exact usage of concord (concordia in the original Latin) has led to debate among scholars. Some such as Thomas Hodgkin, J. B. Bury, and William Bayless consider it grounds for the belief that Marcian may have recognized Avitus. Most scholars take a more conservative stance on it; Ernst Stein suggests that it is merely a reflection of West Roman propaganda, whereas Norman Baynes believes it indicates that Marcian was cordial to Avitus, neither hostile nor friendly. Classicist Courtenay Edward Stevens interprets the phrase as meaning only that the meeting of the diplomats was amicable, rather than reflecting a relationship between the two states.

The historian Geoffrey Nathan suggests the fact that only two Western delegates attended the Council of Chalcedon points to a new level of Western Roman self-absorption in their own political and religious affairs. He mentions that the canon from this council delegating authority over the whole east to the See of Constantinople marks a religious separation. Authority over the Church in the Eastern Roman Empire would prove a point of contention between Rome and Constantinople, leading up to the East–West Schism.

== Death ==
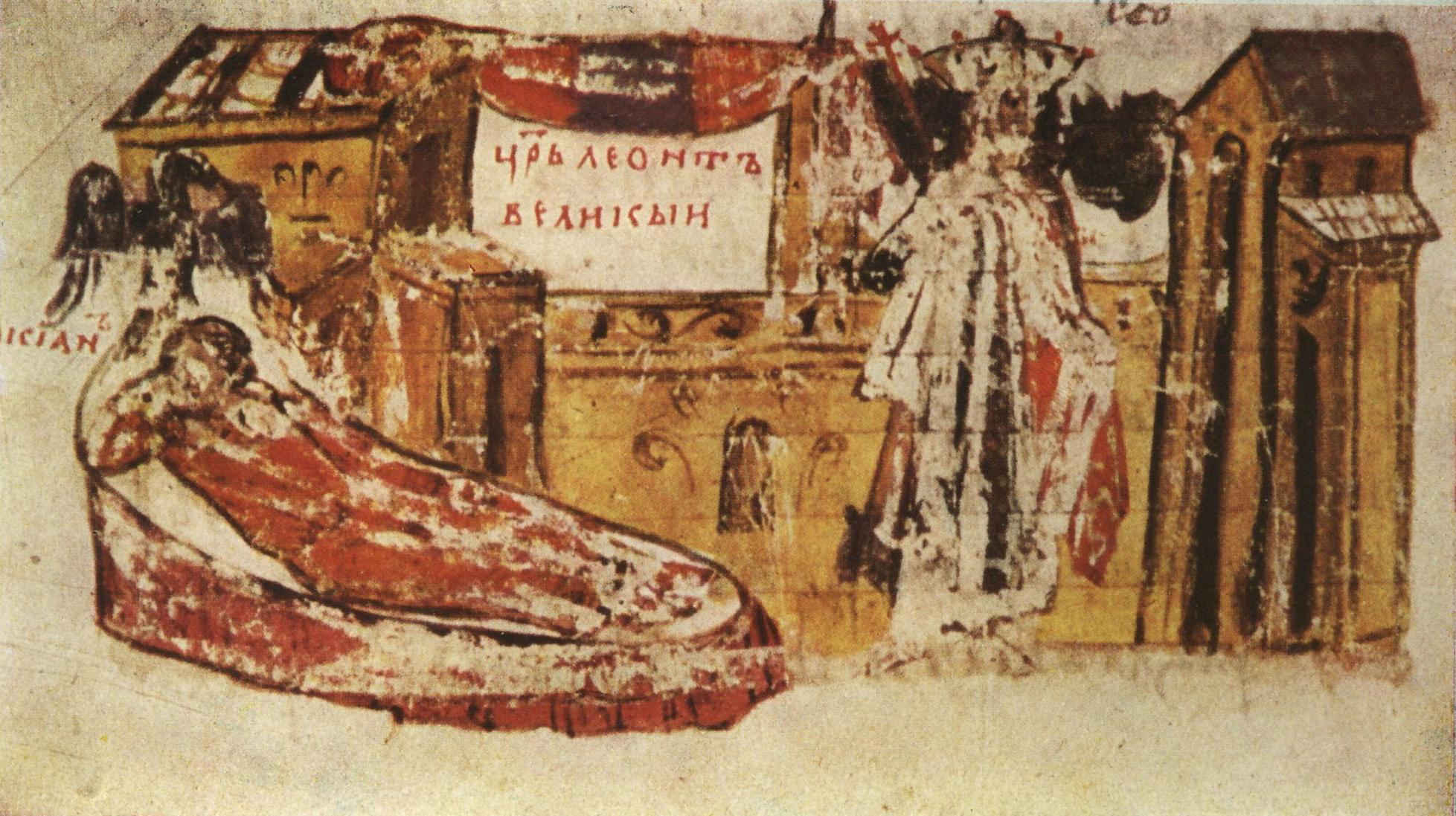
Death of Marcian, who is succeeded by Leo I (right). Scene from the 12th century Manasses Chronicle.

Marcian's reign ended on 27 January 457, when he died, aged 65, possibly of gangrene. Theodorus Lector and Theophanes the Confessor say that Marcian died after a long religious procession from the Grand Palace to the Hebdomon, where he made the journey on foot, despite the fact that he could barely walk because of severe foot inflammation, possibly gout. He was buried in the Church of the Holy Apostles, in Constantinople, next to his wife Pulcheria, in a porphyry sarcophagus that was described in the 10th century by Constantine VII Porphyrogenitus in the De Ceremoniis. He left the Eastern Empire with seven million solidi in its treasury, an impressive achievement considering the economic ruin inflicted upon Eastern Rome by the Huns, both through warfare and the massive subsidies they received under Theodosius.

Although Marcian had a son-in-law, Anthemius, he did not have any connection to the Theodosians, which Marcian himself had gained through his marriage to Pulcheria, and thus would not be considered a legitimate dynastic heir, so Aspar was once again left to play the role of emperor-maker. He selected Leo I, a fifty-year-old officer commanding a unit in one of the praesental armies—two field armies based near Constantinople. A later source claims that the Eastern Roman Senate offered to elect Aspar himself, but he declined, with the cryptic comment: "I fear that a tradition in ruling might be initiated through me". This comment has often been interpreted to be a reference to the fact that he was an Arian, or else to his Alanic heritage.

Anthemius would later be sent by Leo to become the Western Roman emperor; Leo nominated him to be Western Emperor in the spring of 467, to fill the vacancy left by the death of Emperor Libius Severus since 465. Leo sent Anthemius to Rome with an army, headed by Marcellinus, the magister militum of Dalmatia; upon nearing Rome, Anthemius was installed as emperor on 12 April 467.

== Legacy ==
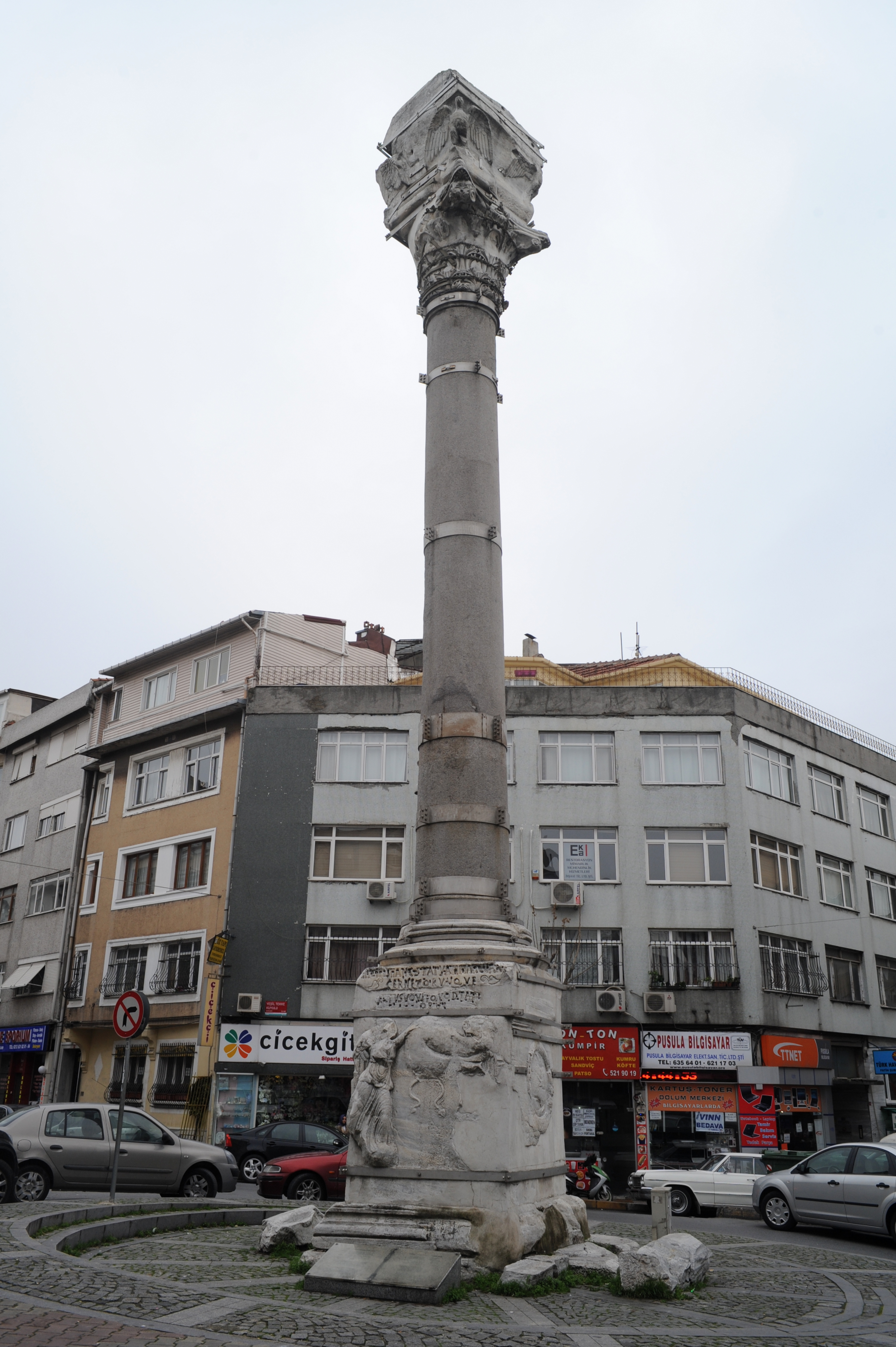
The Column of Marcian in 2011

Marcian was regarded favorably by Eastern Roman and Byzantine sources, often compared to Emperors Constantine I and Theodosius I. Marcian's reign was seen by many later Byzantine writers, such as Theophanes the Confessor, as a golden age: Marcian secured the Eastern Empire both politically and financially, set an orthodox religious line that future emperors would follow, and stabilized the capital city politically. Some later scholars attribute his success not just to his skill, but also to a large degree of luck. Not only had he been fortunate enough to have Pulcheria to legitimize his rule, but for much of it the two greatest external threats to Rome, the Sassanian Empire and the Huns, were absorbed with their own internal problems. Further, no natural disasters or plagues occurred during his reign. He was remembered fondly by the people of Constantinople, who would shout "Reign like Marcian!" at the installation of future emperors.

The Prefect of Constantinople Tatianus built a column dedicated to Marcian, sometime between 450 and 452. It still stands in Istanbul, near the north branch of the Mese, though the statue of Marcian that originally topped it has been lost. Marcian also had a statue in the Forum of Arcadius, which contained the statues of several of the successors of Emperor Arcadius. Marcian may have been the sponsor of the Chrysotriklinos of the Great Palace of Constantinople. The Patria of Constantinople states that Marcian constructed it, whereas the 10th century encyclopedia Suda states that Emperor Justin II built it, a view with which most historians agree. The Byzantine historian Joannes Zonaras states that Justin II actually rebuilt an older construction, which some historians identify as the Heptaconch Hall of Emperor Justinian.

== In popular culture ==
Marcian is played by the Hollywood star Jeff Chandler in the 1954 period adventure Sign of the Pagan. Jack Palance co-stars as Attila and Ludmilla Tchérina plays Pulcheria.

== Primary sources ==
- Chronicon Paschale
- Evagrius Scholasticus, Ecclesiastical History
- Hydatius, Chronicle
- John Malalas, Chronographia
- John of Nikiû, Chronicle
- Jordanes, Romana
- George Kedrenos, Synopsis historion
- Marcellinus Comes, Annales
- Michael the Syrian, Chronicle
- Nikephoros Kallistos Xanthopoulos, Historia Ecclesiastica
- Priscus, History of Byzantium
- Pseudo-Dionysius, Corpus Areopagiticum
- John Rufus, Plerophoriae
- Theophanes the Confessor, Chronographia
- Theodorus Lector, Historia Ecclesiastica
- Zacharias Rhetor, Church History
- Joannes Zonaras, Extracts of History
- Zosimus, Historia Nova

== Sources ==
- Amirav, Hagit (2015). Authority and Performance: Sociological Perspectives on the Council of Chalcedon (AD 451). Göttingen, Germany: Vandenhoeck & Ruprecht. ISBN 978-3-647-20868-8.
- Babcock, Michael A. (2005). The Night Attila Died: Solving the Murder of Attila the Hun (1st ed.). Ann Arbor, Michigan: University of Michigan. ISBN 978-0-425-20272-2.
- Baldwin, Barry (1982). "Some Addenda to the Prosopography of the Later Roman Empire". Historia: Zeitschrift für Alte Geschichte. 31 (1): 97–111. JSTOR 4435791.
- Bauer, Susan Wise (2010). The History of the Medieval World: From the Conversion of Constantine to the First Crusade. New York: W.W. Norton. ISBN 978-0-3930-5975-5.
- Baynes, Norman H. (1922). "A Note on Professor Bury's 'History of the Later Roman Empire'". The Journal of Roman Studies. 12: 207–229. doi:10.2307/296189. JSTOR 296189.
- Bjornlie, M. Shane (2016). The Life and Legacy of Constantine: Traditions through the Ages. New York: Taylor and Francis. ISBN 978-1-3170-2565-8.
- Burgess, R.W. (1993–1994). "The Accession of Marcian in the Light of Chalcedonian Apologetic and Monophysite Polemic". Byzantinische Zeitschrift. 86/87: 47–68.
- Bury, J.B. (2012) [1923]. History of the Later Roman Empire from the Death of Theodosius I to the Death of Justinian. New York: Dover Publications. ISBN 978-0-4861-4338-5.
- Bury, John Bagnell (1889). A History of the Later Roman Empire, from Arcadius to Irene (395 A.D. to 565 A.D.). University Park, Pennsylvania: Pennsylvania State University. OCLC 83109100.
- Clover, Frank M. (1978). "The Family and Early Career of Anicius Olybrius". Historia: Zeitschrift für Alte Geschichte. 27 (1): 169–196. JSTOR 4435589.
- Croke, Brian (1978). "The Date and Circumstances of Marcian's Decease". Byzantion. 48. JSTOR 44170550.
- D'Ayala, Dina; Fodde, Enrico (2008). Structural Analysis of Historic Construction: Preserving Safety and Significance. Bath: CRC Press. ISBN 978-1-4398-2822-9.
- Davis, Stephen J. (2004). The Early Coptic Papacy: The Egyptian Church and Its Leadership in Late Antiquity. Cairo, Egypt: American University in Cairo Press. ISBN 978-977-424-830-6.
- Dzino, Danijel; Parry, Ken (2017). Byzantium, Its Neighbours and Its Cultures. Leiden: BRILL. ISBN 978-9-0043-4491-4.
- Elton, Hugh (2018). The Roman Empire in Late Antiquity: A Political and Military History. Cambridge, UK: Cambridge University Press. ISBN 978-1-108-45631-9.
- Evans, J. A. S. (2002). The Age of Justinian: The Circumstances of Imperial Power. Abingdon: Routledge. ISBN 978-1-1345-5976-3.
- Freely, John; Çakmak, Ahmet S. (2004). Byzantine Monuments of Istanbul. New York: Cambridge University Press. ISBN 978-0-5211-7905-8.
- Friell, Gerard; Williams, Stephen (2005). The Rome that Did Not Fall: The Survival of the East in the Fifth Century. Hoboken: Routledge. ISBN 978-1-1347-3546-4.
- Gallagher, Clarence (2008). "The Two Churches". The Oxford Handbook of Byzantine Studies. By Jeffreys, Elizabeth; Haldon, John; Cormack, Robin. Oxford: Oxford University Press. ISBN 978-0-1992-5246-6.
- Grant, Michael (1985). The Roman Emperors: A Biographical Guide to the Rulers of Imperial Rome 31 BC – AD 476. New York: Scribner's. ISBN 978-0-684-18388-6.
- Kazhdan, Alexander P., ed. (1991). "Marcian". The Oxford Dictionary of Byzantium. Oxford: Oxford University Press. pp. 1296–1297. ISBN 978-0-19-504652-6.
- Kazhdan, Alexander P., ed. (1991a). "Eparchius Avitus". The Oxford Dictionary of Byzantium. Oxford: Oxford University Press. p. 704. ISBN 978-0-19-504652-6.
- Kazhdan, Alexander P., ed. (1991b). "Mese". The Oxford Dictionary of Byzantium. Oxford: Oxford University Press. pp. 1346–1347. ISBN 978-0-19-504652-6.
- Christophilopoulou, Aikaterinē (1986). Byzantine History. A. M. Hakkert. ISBN 978-90-256-0836-1.
- Head, Constance (1982). Imperial Byzantine Portraits: A Verbal and Graphic Gallery. Ann Arbor, Michigan: University of Michigan. ISBN 978-0-89241-084-2.
- Herrin, Judith (2009). Byzantium: The Surprising Life of a Medieval Empire. Princeton: Princeton University Press. ISBN 978-0-6911-4369-9.
- Holmes, Richard; Singleton, Charles; Jones, Spencer (2001). "Arms Trade". The Oxford Companion to Military History. Oxford University Press. doi:10.1093/acref/9780198606963.001.0001. ISBN 978-0-1986-0696-3.
- Holum, Kenneth G. (1989). Theodosian Empresses: Women and Imperial Dominion in Late Antiquity. Oakland, California: University of California Press. ISBN 978-0-520-06801-8.
- Jones, Arnold Hugh Martin; Martindale, J. R.; Morris, J. (1980). The Prosopography of the Later Roman Empire: Volume 2, AD 395–527. Cambridge: Cambridge University Press. ISBN 978-0-521-20159-9.
- Jones, Arnold Hugh Martin (1986). The Later Roman Empire, 284-602: A Social Economic and Administrative Survey. Vol. 1st. Baltimore, Maryland: Johns Hopkins University Press. ISBN 978-0-8018-3353-3.
- Kelly, Christopher (2010). The End of Empire: Attila the Hun & the Fall of Rome. New York: W. W. Norton & Company. ISBN 978-0-393-07266-2.
- Kelly, Christopher (2013). Theodosius II: Rethinking the Roman Empire in Late Antiquity. Cambridge, UK: Cambridge University Press. ISBN 978-1-107-27690-1.
- Kostenec, Jan (2008). "Chrysotriklinos". Encyclopaedia of the Hellenic World, Constantinople.
- Lacey, James (2016). Great Strategic Rivalries: From The Classical World to the Cold War. Oxford, UK: Oxford University Press. ISBN 978-0-19-062047-9.
- Lee, A. D. (2001). "The Eastern Empire: Theodosius to Anastasius". The Cambridge Ancient History, Volume 14. By Cameron, Averil; Ward-Perkins, Bryan; Whitby, Michael. Cambridge: Cambridge University Press. ISBN 978-0-5213-2591-2.
- Lee, A. D. (2013). From Rome to Byzantium AD 363 to 565: The Transformation of Ancient Rome. Edinburgh: Edinburgh University Press. ISBN 978-0-7486-6835-9.
- Lilie, Ralph-Johannes (2014). "Reality and Invention: Reflections on Byzantine Historiography". Dumbarton Oaks Papers. 68: 157–210. JSTOR 24643758.
- Mathisen, Ralph W. (1981). "Avitus, Italy and the East in A.D. 455–456". Byzantion. 51 (1): 232–247. JSTOR 44170681.
- Mathisen, Ralph W. (1998). "Roman Emperors – DIR Anthemius". www.roman-emperors.org. Archived from the original on 24 June 2018.
- McEvoy, Meaghan A. (2013). Child Emperor Rule in the Late Roman West, AD 367–455. Oxford University Press. doi:10.1093/acprof:oso/9780199664818.001.0001. ISBN 978-0-1996-6481-8.
- Meijer, Fik (2004). Emperors Don't Die in Bed. New York: Routledge. ISBN 978-1-1343-8406-8.
- Meyendorff, John (1989). Imperial Unity and Christian Divisions: The Church 450-680 A.D. The Church in history. Vol. 2. Crestwood, NY: St. Vladimir's Seminary Press.
- Mikaberidze, Alexander (2015). Historical Dictionary of Georgia (2 ed.). Rowman & Littlefield. ISBN 978-1-4422-4146-6.
- Manoogian, Torkom (1984). Vardanankʻ ew Vahaneankʻ. Ann Arbor, Michigan: University of Michigan. OCLC 31636926.
- Nathan, Geoffrey S. (1998). "Roman Emperors – DIR Marcian". www.roman-emperors.org. Archived from the original on 6 July 2018.
- Norwich, John Julius (1998). A Short History of Byzantium. New York: Vintage Books. ISBN 978-0-6797-7269-9.
- Pharr, Clyde; Davidson, Theresa Sherrer; Pharr, Mary Brown (2001) [1952]. The Theodosian Code and Novels, and the Sirmondian Constitutions. Union: Lawbook Exchange. ISBN 978-1-5847-7146-3.
- Smith, Bonnie G. (2008). The Oxford Encyclopedia of Women in World History. Vol. 1st. Oxford, UK: Oxford University Press. ISBN 978-0-19-514890-9.
- Thompson, E. A. (1950). "The Foreign Policies of Theodosius II and Marcian". Hermathena. 76 (76): 58–75. JSTOR 23037876.
- Vasiliev, A. A. (1948). "Imperial Porphyry Sarcophagi in Constantinople". Dumbarton Oaks Papers. 4: 1+3–26. doi:10.2307/1291047. JSTOR 1291047.
- Vasiliev, A. A. (1980) [1958]. History of the Byzantine Empire, 324–1453. Volume I. Madison: University of Wisconsin Press. ISBN 978-0-2998-0925-6.
- Whitworth, Patrick (2017). Constantinople to Chalcedon: Shaping the World to Come. Sacristy Press. ISBN 978-1-910519-47-9.

Regnal titles
Preceded by Theodosius II	Eastern Roman emperor 450–457	Succeeded by Leo I
Political offices
Preceded by Valentinian III and Gennadius Avienus	Roman consul 451	Succeeded by Bassus Herculanus and Sporacius
