= Thalassius =

Thalassius may refer to:

- Thalassius (spider), a synonym of Nilus, a genus of nursery web spiders
- Saint Thalassius, a 5th-century Syrian hermit
