= Flavius Rufius Praetextatus Postumianus =

2nd century Roman jurist

- Born: 395 AD; Rome
- Died: 447 AD; Rome
- Occupation: Prefect
- Scientific career
- Fields: Consul

Flavius Rufius Praetextatus Postumianus (fl. c. AD 395–447) was a Roman prefect and consul. He served as urban prefect of Rome in the 4th century AD.

== Career ==
He served as consul and prefect of Rome from 1 January 448 AD to 31 December 448 AD.

== See also ==
- Avitus Marinianus
- List of urban prefects of Rome

Political offices
Preceded by Fl. Ardabur (consul 447), Fl. Zeno	Consul of the Roman Empire; 449 with Astyrius	Succeeded by Imp. Caes. Fl. Florentius Romanus Protogenes Augustus VII, Gennadius Avienus
