= Avitus Marinianus =

Roman senator

Flavius Avitus Marinianus (fl. 423–448) was a politician of the Western Roman Empire during the reign of Honorius.

== Biography ==
Avitus was praetorian prefect and consul in 423. He is mentioned in the Gesta de purgatione Xysti III episcopi in a list of aristocrats involved in the investigations against Pope Sixtus III. Although the Gesta has been long recognized as a later forgery, B.L. Twyman argued in 1970 that the list of aristocrats was taken from a later papal investigation concerning the deposition of bishop Celidonius by archbishop Hilarius of Arles. T.D. Barnes subsequently showed that the list was best explained as the product of "a writer of the sixth century [who] has deliberately mixed genuine and fictitious persons."

He had a wife, Anastasia, and a son, Rufius Praetextatus Postumianus (consul in 448); it is possible that Rufius Viventius Gallus was another son. Marinianus and his wife were Christians; at Pope Leo I's request, they restored the mosaic on the façade of the Old St. Peter's Basilica, as recorded by an inscription on the mosaic itself.

== Notes ==
Political offices
| Preceded by Honorius Augustus XIII; Theodosius Augustus X | Roman consul 423 with Asclepiodotus | Succeeded by Castinus; Victor |
