= Baradates =

Syrian hermit (d. c. 460)

Saint, Venerable Baradat
- Born: Syria
- Residence: Cyrrhus, Syria
- Died: c. 460
- Venerated in: Eastern Orthodox Church; Catholic Church
- Canonized: Pre-congregation
- Feast: February 22

Baradates (died circa 460) was a hermit who lived in the Diocese of Cyrrhus in Syria, and whose bishop, Theodoret, called him "the admirable Baradates."

Baradates lived in a tiny hut, too small for him to stand upright, and he wore a leather garment that exposed only his mouth and nose. He was said to have been very learned, particularly in theology. Emperor Leo wrote him, asking his advice regarding the Council of Chalcedon. In the Roman Catholic Church, as well as the Eastern Orthodox Church, the Feast of St Baradates is February 22.

== Monks of Ramsgate account ==
The monks of St Augustine's Abbey, Ramsgate wrote in their Book of Saints (1921),

BARADATAS (St.) Hermit (Feb. 22)
(5th cent.) A Syrian Solitary of whose austere life Theodoret his contemporary has left us a glowing account. He is otherwise celebrated as having been adviser to the Emperor Leo I of Constantinople, in regard to his proceedings at the Council of Chalcedon. He died some years later, about A.D. 460.

== Butler's account ==
The hagiographer Alban Butler (1710–1773) wrote in his Lives of the Fathers, Martyrs, and Other Principal Saints under February 22,

St. Baradat, Confessor. He lived in the same diocess, in a solitary hut, made of wood in trellis, like windows, says Theodoret, (Note: This passage of Theodoret shows that the windows of the ancients were made of trellis or wicker, before the invention of glass; though not universally; for in the ruins of Herculaneum, near Portichi, were found windows of a diaphanous thin slate, such as the rich in Rome sometimes used.) exposed to all the severities of the weather. He was clothed with the skins of wild beasts, and by conversing continually with God, he attained to an eminent degree of wisdom, and knowledge of heavenly things. He left his wooden prison by the order of the patriarch of Antioch, giving a proof of his humility by his ready obedience. He studied to imitate all the practices of penance, which all the other solitaries of those parts exercised, though of a tender constitution himself. The fervour of his soul, and the fire of divine love, supported him under his incredible labours, though his body was weak and infirm. It is sloth that makes us so often allege a pretended weakness of constitution, in the practice of penance and the exercises of devotion, which courage and fervour would not even feel. See Theodoret, Phil. c. 22. t. 3. p. 868, and c. 27.

== Sources ==
- Butler, Alban (1866), The Lives of the Fathers, Martyrs, and Other Principal Saints, vol. 2, James Duffy This article incorporates text from this source, which is in the public domain.
- St. Augustine's Abbey, Ramsgate (1921), The Book of saints : a dictionary of servants of God canonized by the Catholic Church, London: A. & C. Black, ltd. This article incorporates text from this source, which is in the public domain.
