= Florentius Romanus Protogenes =

Consul of the Roman Empire
- In office 449

Florentius Romanus Protogenes (Greek: Φλωρέντιος Ρωμανός ό Πρωτογένης; fl. 448 – 451) was a Roman statesman who served as the Consul in 449.

== Bibliography ==
- Fl. Florentius Romanus Protogenes, PLRE II, Cambridge University Press, 1980, ISBN 0521201594, pp. 927–928.

Political offices
| Preceded by Fl. Rufius Praetextatus Postumianus, Fl. Zeno | Consul of the Roman Empire; 449 with Astyrius | Succeeded by Imp. Caes. Fl. Placidus Valentinianus Augustus VII, Gennadius Avienus |
