= Theodoret =

5th-century Byzantine theologian and bishop

Blessed Theodoret of Cyrus
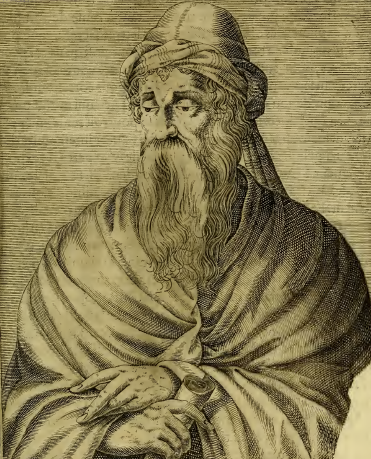
- Theodoret of Cyrus
- Born: c. 393; Antioch, Coele Syria, Roman Empire
- Died: c. 458; Cyrrhus, Syria Prima, Eastern Roman Empire
- Venerated in: Eastern Orthodox Church

Theodoret of Cyrus or Cyrrhus (Ancient Greek: Θεοδώρητος Κύρρου; c. 393 – c. 458) was a notable theologian of the School of Antioch, biblical commentator, and bishop of Cyrrhus (423–457). He participated in several 5th-century Christological controversies within the Eastern Roman Church that resulted in various ecumenical acts and schisms. Theodoret wrote against Cyril of Alexandria's Twelve Anathemas, which were sent to Nestorius, and did not condemn Nestorius until the Council of Chalcedon. Selected writings by Theodoret directed against Cyril formed part of the subject matter of the Three Chapters Controversy and were condemned posthumously at the Second Council of Constantinople (553). He has been accorded the epithet "Blessed" by individuals in the Eastern Orthodox Church. (Note: The Eastern Orthodox Protopresbyter Michael Pomazansky repeatedly refers to him as "Blessed". Hieromonk Seraphim Rose also refers to Theodoret as "Blessed" in his book The Place of Blessed Augustine in the Orthodox Church while explaining the nature of the term "Blessed" in the Russian Orthodox Church, referring to how both Sts. Augustine and Jerome are referred to as "Blessed" too despite being part of the Orthodox Saints Calendar.)

== Biography ==
According to the historian Tillemont, he was born at Antioch in 393 and died about 458, either at Cyrrhus (an estimated eighty Roman miles east of Antioch) or at the monastery near Apamea (fifty-four Roman miles southeast of Antioch).

Information regarding his life is derived primarily from his Epistles and his Religious History (Philotheos historia). He was the child of a prosperous Antiochene couple. Encouraged after his mother was cured of a serious eye complaint and converted to a strict religious life by Peter the Galatian, an ascetic living in the locality, Theodoret's parents sought further help from local holy men, as she had been childless for the twelve years of her marriage. For years their hopes remained unfulfilled. Eventually, Theodoret's birth was promised by a hermit named Macedonius the Barley-Eater on the condition of the child's dedication to God, from which the name Theodoret ("gift of God") is derived.

Theodoret received an extensive education. Although his own writings suggest his training was exclusively religious, his literary output demonstrates that he also acquired a broad classical education, a common expectation for a child of prosperous parents in a city known as a centre of secular learning. He visited Peter the Galatian weekly, was instructed by Macedonius and other ascetics, and at an early age became a lector among the clergy of Antioch. He studied the works of Diodore of Tarsus and Theodore of Mopsuestia, having been raised in their theological tradition. His correspondents included the sophists Aerius and Isokasius. He understood Syriac as well as Greek, but knew neither Hebrew nor Latin. In his letters, he quotes from Homer, Sophocles, Euripides, Aristophanes, Demosthenes, and Thucydides. By the age of twenty-three, following the death of his parents, he divided his fortune among the poor and became a monk in the monastery of Nicerte, near Apamea, where he lived for about seven years.

In 423, he left the monastery upon his appointment as Bishop of Cyrrhus. The diocese covered approximately 1,600 square miles and comprised 800 parishes, with a small town as its see. Supported by the appeals of local hermits, and despite facing personal danger, Theodoret vigorously maintained his doctrinal positions. He converted more than 1,000 Marcionites in his diocese, in addition to many Arians and Macedonians. He removed more than 200 copies of Tatian's Diatessaron from the churches, erected new church buildings, and supplied them with relics.

His philanthropic and economic interests were extensive. He endeavoured to secure relief for people oppressed by taxation and, using his episcopal revenues, erected baths, bridges, halls, and aqueducts. He attracted rhetoricians and physicians to the city and reminded officials of their duties. He sent letters of encouragement to the persecuted Christians of Persian Armenia and provided refuge to Celestiacus, a Carthaginian who had fled the rule of the Vandals.

== The Nestorian controversy ==
Theodoret was a prominent figure in the Christological controversies of the 5th century involving Nestorius of Constantinople and Cyril of Alexandria. Theodoret joined in the petition of John I of Antioch to Nestorius to affirm the term Theotokos ("Mother of God"), and at John's request, wrote against Cyril's Twelve Anathemas.

He may have drafted the Antiochian confession of faith, intended to present a clear exposition of the Nicene Creed to the emperor. He was a member and spokesman of the deputation of eight from Antioch called by the emperor to Constantinople in 431, following the First Council of Ephesus. He did not assent to the condemnation of Nestorius. John, reconciled to Cyril by the emperor's order, sought to bring Theodoret to submission by entrenching upon Theodoret's eparchy.

Theodoret sought to preserve the peace of the Church by obtaining the adoption of a formula avoiding the unconditional condemnation of Nestorius, and toward the close of 434 worked for reconciliation between the Eastern churches. However, Cyril maintained his position. When Cyril launched an attack in 437 against Diodorus of Tarsus and Theodore of Mopsuestia, John sided with them, and Theodoret assumed the defence of the Antiochian party (c. 439). Domnus II, the successor of John, retained him as his counsellor. After the death of Cyril, adherents of Antiochian theology were appointed to bishoprics. Irenaeus, a friend of Nestorius, with the cooperation of Theodoret, became bishop of Tyre, despite the protests of Dioscorus, Cyril's successor. Dioscorus turned specifically against Theodoret and secured an order from the court confining him to Cyrrhus.

Theodoret then composed the Eranistes. His efforts at court for self-justification against the charges of Dioscorus, as well as the countercharge of Domnus accusing Eutyches of Apollinarianism, were in vain. The Emperor Theodosius II excluded Theodoret from the Second Council of Ephesus in 449. At the council, because of his Epistle 151 against Cyril and his defence of Diodorus and Theodore, he was condemned without a hearing and excommunicated; his writings were ordered to be burned. Domnus gave his assent.

Theodoret was compelled by imperial authorities to leave Cyrrhus and retire to his monastery at Nicerte, near Apamea. He appealed to Pope Leo I of Rome, but the revocation of the judgments against him was not granted by imperial edict until the new rulers, Marcian and Pulcheria, took power after the death of Emperor Theodosius II in 450. He was ordered to participate in the Council of Chalcedon, which created violent opposition from the Alexandrian party. He first took part only as an accuser, yet sat among the bishops, in contrast to Dioscorus, who was seated with the accused despite being the canonical Patriarch of Alexandria. Then, he was pressured by the Council Fathers (October 26, 451) to pronounce the anathema against Nestorius. His conduct suggests he performed this with a reservation: his anathema was restricted to Nestorius's alleged teaching of "two Sons in Christ" and the denial of the term Theotokos. Upon this, he was declared orthodox and restored to his see.

Following the Council of Chalcedon, his activity is primarily documented by a letter from Leo charging him to guard the Chalcedonian Definition. With Diodorus and Theodore, he was no less reviled by the Monophysites than Nestorius himself, and was considered a heretic by them and their associates. After Chalcedon, he lived in Cyrrhus until his death, which is traditionally dated to c. 458–460.

The Three Chapters Controversy led to the condemnation of his writings against Cyril in the Second Council of Constantinople (553), despite his personal exoneration earlier at Chalcedon as "orthodox".

== Works ==
=== Exegetical ===
Theodoret's exegetical works constitute his most extensive literary output and are considered his most significant contribution to theology. Scholars establish a chronology of these works by studying Theodoret's references in later works to his earlier ones. The commentary on the Song of Songs, written while he was a young bishop (though not before 430), precedes his work on the Psalms. His commentaries on the prophets began with Daniel, followed by Ezekiel and the Minor Prophets. Subsequently, his commentary on the Psalms was completed before 436, while those on Isaiah, Jeremiah, and the Pauline Epistles (including Hebrews) were written before 448. Theodoret's last exegetical works were the Interpretations of Difficult Passages in the Octateuch and the Quaestiones dealing with the books of Samuel, Kings, and Chronicles, written c. 452–453.

With the exception of a few verses from the commentary on Galatians (2:6–13) and fragments of the commentary on Isaiah preserved in the catenae, Theodoret's exegetical writings are extant. Exegetical material attributed to him on the Gospels in the catenae may have originated from his other works, and spurious interpolations occur in his comments on the Octateuch.

His representation of orthodox doctrine consists of a collection of Scripture passages. For Theodoret, the biblical authors are instruments of the Holy Spirit, though they do not lose their individual characteristics. He states that understanding is hindered by the unavoidable imperfection of translations. Unacquainted with Hebrew, Theodoret uses the Syriac translation, the Septuagint, and other Greek versions.

In principle, his exegesis is grammatical-historical, and he criticizes the intrusion of the commentator's own ideas. His aim is to avoid the extremes of excessive literalism and unrestrained allegory. Consequently, he protests against the literal interpretation of the Song of Songs as Solomonic erotic poetry, viewing it as degrading to the Holy Spirit; instead, he argues that Scripture often speaks "figuratively" and "in riddles." In the Old Testament, many elements carry typological significance and already prophetically embody Christian doctrine. Divine illumination affords the right understanding, following apostolic teaching and recognizing New Testament fulfillment. The exegetical tradition of the Church Fathers is considered valuable, though not binding. Theodoret prefers to select the best among various interpretations available to him, especially those of Theodore of Mopsuestia, and supplements them with his own insights. His work is characterized by clarity and simplicity of statement; he is credited with preserving the exegetical heritage of the School of Antioch.

=== Dogmatic ===
Many of Theodoret's dogmatic works have been lost; five major treatises, however, have survived.

His chief Christological work is the Eranistes (The Beggar), written in three dialogues. In it, Theodoret describes his opponents, principally the Eutychians, as beggars passing off their doctrines gathered by scraps from diverse heretical sources, and himself as the orthodox defender. The work is interspersed with lengthy florilegia (anthologies of patristic citations), which scholars suggest may be the reason for its preservation. These florilegia provide evidence of Theodoret's learning, comprising 238 texts drawn from 88 works, including pre-Nicene writers such as Ignatius, Irenaeus, and Hippolytus, as well as theologians such as Athanasius and the Cappadocian Fathers. This use of florilegia is cited as heralding a new stage in doctrinal development by creating a new authority for Christian theology: that of the Fathers.

Two works, On the Holy and Life-giving Trinity and On the Incarnation of the Lord, survived historically through misattribution to his opponent, Cyril of Alexandria.

Another surviving work is the Refutation of the Twelve Anathemas, a rejection of the anathemas pronounced against Nestorius by Cyril of Alexandria. The text was preserved within Cyril's apology against Theodoret. Theodoret identifies Apollinarianism in Cyril's teaching and rejects the idea of a "contracting into one" of the two natures of the Only-Begotten, as well as a separation into two sons (Epistle 143). Instead of a "hypostatic union," he accepts only a union that "manifests the essential properties or modes of the natures." The man united to God was born of Mary; between God the Logos and the form of a servant, a distinction must be drawn.

The Expositio rectae fidei (Exposition of the True Faith) was preserved among the writings of Justin Martyr. However, Lebon (1930) and Sellers (1945) independently identified it as the work of Theodoret, likely dating it to before the outbreak of the Nestorian controversy.

Only minor fragments (cf. Epistle 16) of Theodoret's defence of Diodorus and Theodore of Mopsuestia (438-444) have been preserved.

Theodoret mentions having written against Arius and Eunomius, which is generally assumed to be a single combined work, to which were joined three treatises against the Macedonians. Additionally, there were two works against the Apollinarians, and of the Opus adversus Marcionem, no complete text has been preserved.

For Theodoret, God is immutable even in becoming man; the two natures are separate in Christ, and God the Logos is ever immortal and impassible. Each nature remained "pure" after the union, retaining its properties to the exclusion of all transmutation and intermixture. Of a collection of twenty-seven orations in defence of various propositions, the first six align with Theodoret's theology. A few extracts from the five panegyric orations on John Chrysostom were preserved by Photius (Bibliotheca, codex 273).

=== Apologetic and Historical ===
One of the apologetic writings was the Ad quaestiones magorum (composed between 429 and 436), now lost, in which Theodoret justified the Old Testament sacrifices as alternatives to Egyptian idolatry and criticised the accounts of the Magi who worshipped the elements; the work is mentioned in his Ecclesiastical History (Book V, Chapter 38).

De providentia, or Ten Discourses on Providence, consists of apologetic discourses arguing for divine providence based on the physical order (Discourses I-IV) and the moral and social order (Discourses VI-X). Scholars generally place their delivery to the educated Greek-speaking audience of Antioch between 431 and 435. Unlike most sermons of the period, they consist of systematic philosophical arguments and lectures rather than homilies on scriptural texts.

The Graecarum Affectionum Curatio (Cure of the Greek Maladies), subtitled The Truth of the Gospel proved from Greek Philosophy, is a work in twelve books that attempted to demonstrate the truth of Christianity using Greek philosophy, in contrast to pagan ideas and practices. It forms one of the last apologies written, as the need for such works diminished in an age of Christian dominance. Theodoret argued that the truth is self-consistent where it is not obscured by error and that it validates itself as the power of life, whereas philosophy is only a presentiment of it. Scholars consider this work noteworthy for its clarity of arrangement and style.

The Ecclesiastical History of Theodoret, which begins with the rise of Arianism and ends with the death of Theodore of Mopsuestia in 429, is different in style from the histories of Socrates Scholasticus and Sozomen; although the work was completed in 449–450, it does not cover the period between 429 and its completion. It contains many sources otherwise lost, especially letters on the Arian controversy. However, critics describe the book as partisan, noting that opposing theological factions are consistently portrayed negatively and described as afflicted with the "Arian plague." The narrative is more concise than that of other historians, and Theodoret often juxtaposes documents with only brief commentary. Original material regarding the church of Antioch appears chiefly in the latter books.

Scholarly opinion regarding the sources used by Theodoret varies. According to Henricus Valesius, the main sources were Socrates and Sozomen. Albert Güldenpenning placed Rufinus first in importance, followed by Eusebius of Caesarea, Athanasius, Sozomen, Sabinus, Philostorgius, Gregory Nazianzen, and Socrates. N. Glubokovskij identifies Eusebius, Rufinus, Philostorgius, and, perhaps, Sabinus as sources.

At the request of Sporacius, a military commander, Theodoret compiled a Compendium of Heretical Accounts (Haereticarum fabularum compendium), which includes a heresiology (Books I-IV) and a Compendium of Divine Dogmas (Book V). Apart from Origen's De principiis and the De fide orthodoxa of John of Damascus, scholars consider this work to be one of the few systematic representations of the theology of the Greek Fathers.

==== A History of the Monks of Syria ====
The Philotheos historia, also known as A History of the Monks of Syria, which includes the treatise De divina charitate, contains the biographies of thirty ascetics and anchorites, presented as religious models. It presents a view into the distinct monastic tradition of northern Syria; it is also remarkable for presenting a model of ascetic authority that contrasts sharply with Athanasius's Life of Anthony.

Of the thirty ascetics detailed in A History of the Monks of Syria, the last ten subjects were living when Theodoret completed the work, generally dated to c. 444.

- James of Nisibis (d. 337-8)
- Julian Sabas (d. 367)
- Marcianus (d. 380s)
- Eusebius of Teleda (fl. 350s)
- Publius (fl. 350s)
- Symeon the Elder (fl. 370s)
- Palladius of Antioch (fl. 370s)
- Aphrahat (d. c. 410)
- Peter the Galatian (d. c. 403)
- Theodosius (d. c. 405)
- Romanus (d. c. 400)
- Zeno the Hermit (d. 410s)
- Macedonius of Syria (d. 420)
- Maesymas (fl. late 4th century)
- Acepsimas (fl. late 4th century)
- Maron (d. 410s)
- Abraham (d. 420s)
- Eusebius of Asikha (d. 430s)
- Salamanes
- Maris (d. c. 430)
- James of Cyrrhestica
- Thalassius, Limnaeus, John
- Zebinas, Polychronius, Asclepius
- Symeon Stylites
- Baradates
- Thalelaeus
- Marana and Cyra
- Domnina of Syria

=== Letters ===
Compared to the more than 500 letters known to Nikephoros Kallistos Xanthopoulos in the fourteenth century, only 232 have survived to the modern era. Three collections survive, though there is some overlap between them. 179 letters were edited by Jacques Sirmond in 1642. To these, Ioannes Sakkelion added another 48 letters (known as the Collectio Patmensis) which he published from a manuscript he found at the Monastery of Saint John the Theologian in 1885. Thirty-six letters have been preserved in the official records (Acta) of the Councils of Ephesus and Chalcedon. These letters document rural Christianity in northern Syria, as well as insight into episcopal relationships; the development of Christological issues between the Councils of Ephesus and Chalcedon is evident. There are letters of consolation and commendation, valued for their detail on episcopal life and rhetoric.

An English translation of the surviving letters is part of the Nicene and Post-Nicene Fathers (Second Series, Vol. 3, pp. 250–348).

=== Linguistics ===
Theodoret's works address linguistic issues regarding translations of sacred texts and theological works, and his interest was focused mainly on the exchange between Greek and Syriac. Because of his fluency in Syriac and his life in the Hellenized regions of western Roman Syria, he had a degree of familiarity with the dialect and noted its variations. He explained that "the Osroenians, the Syrians, the people of the Euphrates, the Palestinians, and the Phoenicians all speak Syriac," a term he used to refer to various local Aramaic dialects, "but with a multitude of pronunciation differences." In this passage, he distinguished "Syrians" as the inhabitants to the west of the Euphrates and "Osroenians" (the people of Edessa) to the east, noting their different dialects of the same language.

== Translations ==
- Translations of some of Theodoret's writings can be found in Nicene and Post-Nicene Fathers.
- A modern edition of the Eranistes with English supplementary material was published by Oxford University Press in 1975. ISBN 0198266391
- Theodoret of Cyrus. On Divine Providence, translated and annotated by Thomas P. Halton, 1988 (Ancient Christian Writers, 49) ISBN 9780809104208
- Theodoret of Cyrus. A Cure for Pagan Maladies, translation and introduction by Thomas P. Halton, 2013 (Ancient Christian Writers, 67) ISBN 9780809106066
- Ettlinger, GH, 2003. Theodoret: Eranistes, FC, Washington, DC: Catholic University of America Press.
- Petruccione, John F and RC Hill, 2007. Theodoret of Cyrus. The Questions on the Octateuch, Greek text and English translation, Washington, DC, Catholic University of America Press
- RC Hill has published translations into English of the Commentary on the Psalms (2000, 2001), the Commentary on the Songs of Songs (2001), and the Commentary on the Letters of St Paul (2001)
- István Pásztori-Kupán, Theodoret of Cyrus, (Routledge, 2006), includes full translations of On the Trinity, On the Incarnation, and excerpts from A Cure of Greek Maladies and A Compendium of Heretical Mythification.
- Bilingual editions (Greek text with parallel French translation) of several of the texts mentioned above have been published in recent years in Sources Chrétiennes.

== See also ==
- Chalcedonian Christianity
- Nestorian schism
- Three-Chapter Controversy

== Sources ==
- Brock, Sebastian P. (1994). "Greek and Syriac in Late Antique Syria". Literacy and Power in the Ancient World. Cambridge: Cambridge University Press. pp. 149–160, 234–235. ISBN 9780521587365.
- Canivet, Pierre (1957). Histoire d'une entreprise apologétique au Ve siècle. Paris: Bloud & Gay.
- Canivet, Pierre (1977). Le monachisme syrien selon Théodoret de Cyr. Paris: Beauchesne. ISBN 9782701000763.
- Grillmeier, Aloys (1975) [1965]. Christ in Christian Tradition: From the Apostolic Age to Chalcedon (451). Vol. 1 (2nd revised ed.). Atlanta: John Knox Press. ISBN 9780664223014.
- Guinot, Jean-Noël (1993). "Qui est 'le Syrien' dans les commentaries de Théodoret de Cyr?". Studia Patristica. 25: 60–71. ISBN 9789068315196.
- Lehmann, Henning J. (2008). "What was Theodoret's Mother Tongue? - Is the Question Open or Closed?". Students of the Bible in 4th and 5th Century Syria: Seats of Learning, Sidelights and Syriacisms. Aarhus: Aarhus University Press. pp. 187–216. ISBN 9788779343900.
- Louth, Andrew (2004). "John Chrysostom to Theodoret of Cyrrhus". The Cambridge History of Early Christian Literature. Cambridge: Cambridge University Press. pp. 342–352. ISBN 9780521460835.
- Meyendorff, John (1989). Imperial unity and Christian divisions: The Church 450-680 A.D. Crestwood, NY: St. Vladimir's Seminary Press. ISBN 9780881410563.
- Millar, Fergus (2007). "Theodoret of Cyrrhus: A Syrian in Greek Dress?". From Rome to Constantinople: Studies in Honour of Averil Cameron. Leuven: Peeters Publishers. pp. 105–125. ISBN 9789042919716.
- Pásztori-Kupán, István (2006). Theodoret of Cyrus. London & New York: Routledge. ISBN 9781134391769.
- Petruccione, John F.; Hill, Robert C., eds. (2007a). Theodoret of Cyrus: The Questions on the Octateuch. Vol. 1. Washington: COA Press. ISBN 9780813214993.
- Petruccione, John F.; Hill, Robert C., eds. (2007b). Theodoret of Cyrus: The Questions on the Octateuch. Vol. 2. Washington: COA Press. ISBN 9780813215013.
- Taylor, David G. K. (2002). "Bilingualism and Diglossia in Late Antique Syria and Mesopotamia". Bilingualism in Ancient Society: Language Contact and the Written Word. Oxford: Oxford University Press. pp. 298–331. ISBN 9789004264410.
- Young, Frances; Teal, Andrew (2004). From Nicaea to Chalcedon: A Guide to the Literature and its Background (2nd ed.).
