= Peter the Hermit of Galatia =

Saint Peter the Hermit of Galatia (Greek: Πέτρος ό Ερημίτης) (330 – 429) near Antioch, in Byzantine Syria, lived in the early fifth century AD.

Peter's life is recorded by Theodoret of Cyrrhus whose own family was touched by the saint's gifts of healing.

Peter the Hermit left his home at a very early age and lived as a wandering monk for many years travelling extensively throughout the Near East. Eventually, he settled near Antioch, where he inhabited an empty tomb and lived a very strict asceticism. He cured a woman of a deadly disease through the Sign of the cross.

Peter the Hermit of Galatia near Antioch is commemorated 1 February by the Eastern Orthodox and Byzantine Catholic Churches.

== See also ==
- Christian monasticism
- Stylites
