= Bassus Herculanus =

Roman politician and aristocrat

Flavius Bassus Herculanus (fl. 449–452) was an aristocrat and a politician of the Western Roman Empire, husband of Justa Grata Honoria. He was honoured with the consulate in 452 with Sporacius as his colleague.

He was a member of the senate and his character was very highly regarded. He may have been a member of the Anicii gens.

== Engagement to Honoria ==
Honoria was the sister of Emperor Valentinian III. In 449, she was 31 and had been forbidden to marry, as had Pulcheria and the other sisters of Theodosius II. She had been ordered to remain celibate by command of her brother the emperor. When Honoria was caught sleeping with her chamberlain, the ensuing scandal forced Valentinian to quickly find her a husband who would not pose a threat to his rule, and so he chose Bassus. Faced with the prospect of a loveless marriage, Honoria instead sent a message and her engagement ring to Attila the Hun, asking for his help. He demanded that she be given over to him along with half of the Western Roman Empire. Valentinian refused and the marriage to Bassus went forward.

Preceded by Marcian Augustus; Valerius Faltonius Adelfius	Roman consul 452 with Sporacius	Succeeded by Opilio; Ioannes Vincomalus
