= James of Cyrrhestica =

4th-century Syrian monk

Saint James of Cyrrhestica
- Born: Unknown
- Died: Unknown

James of Cyrrhestica was a 4th-century monk who lived in the Cyrrhestica region of Syria, as attested by Theodoret of Cyrus in his “Religious History”.

== Life ==
James of Cyrrhestica was a follower of Maron who practiced the same open air ascetic system the Maronites would come to be known for. James distinguished himself by wearing iron chains on his body as remedy for his sins.
