= Astyrius =

Roman army officer and politician

Flavius Astyrius or Asturius (fl. 441–449) was a general and a politician of the Western Roman Empire.

== Biography ==
Astyrius was the father-in-law of Merobaudes and belonged to an aristocratic family.

He followed a military career: between 441 and 443 he is attested as dux or magister utriusque militiae. In 441 he was in Tarraconensis (Spain), where he defeated the Bagaudae. In 443 he was succeeded by his son-in-law Merobaudes.

He was appointed consul for the year 449. At the beginning of his office he was in Gaul (probably in the capital city of the praetorian prefecture, Arelate), and Nicetius delivered a panegyric in his honour.

A consular diptych produced by Astyrius in 449 is preserved at Liège. The diptych shows Astyrius seated on a curule chair wearing complete consular regalia and the inscription Flavius Astyrius vir clarissimus et inlustris comes ex magistro utriusque militiae consul ordinarius.

== Bibliography ==
- Martindale, John R., ed. (1980). "Fl. Astyrius". The Prosopography of the Later Roman Empire: Volume II, AD 395–527. Cambridge: Cambridge University Press. pp. 174–175. ISBN 0-521-20159-4.
- Ralph W. Mathisen, People, Personal Expression, and Social Relations in Late Antiquity, University of Michigan Press, 2003, ISBN 0-472-11246-5, pp. 18–19.

Political offices
Preceded by Rufius Praetextatus Postumianus; Zeno	Roman consul 449 with Florentius Romanus Protogenes	Succeeded by Valentinian Augustus VII; Gennadius Avienus
