= Sporacius =

Flavius Sporacius (fl. 5th century AD) was a statesman of the Eastern Roman Empire.

He served as Comes in 448, and Comes domesticorum peditum in 450 and 451, in which capacity he attended some of the Council of Chalcedon in October 451. He was consul for 452, which was probably not recognized by the West.

Preceded by Marcian Augustus; Valerius Faltonius Adelfius	Roman consul 452 with Bassus Herculanus	Succeeded by Opilio; Ioannes Vincomalus
