= Gennadius Avienus =

Roman aristocrat and politician

Gennadius Avienus (fl. 450–460s) was an influential politician of the Western Roman Empire. He was consul in 450, alongside Valentinian III. In 452, he was an envoy to Attila; together with Pope Leo I and Trigetius he successfully negotiated a truce. He had a son and a daughter; his son would go on to be consul in 490.

== Biography ==
Avienus was member of an ancient and noble Roman family, which traced back its origins to the consul of year 59, Marcus Valerius Messalla Corvinus. Avienus was the father of Anicius Probus Faustus, Consul in 490, and of a daughter called Stephania, whose son, Rufius Magnus Faustus Avienus, received the name of his grandfather and was Consul in 502.

Avienus was chosen as Consul for the year 450, together with Emperor Valentinian III. Two years later, in 452, he was sent by Valentinian and the Roman Senate as envoy to the King of the Huns, Attila, together with Trigetius and the Bishop of Rome, Leo I; they succeeded in negotiating a truce with Attila, despite the fact that the historian Prosper of Aquitaine downplayed Avienus' role, giving all the credit for the success to Leo, ignoring both Trigetius and Avienus.

Avienus also held several other offices, of which at least one was civilian, but no particulars have been preserved on this matter.

In 467, the Gallo-Roman poet Sidonius Apollinaris was sent to Rome to bring the Emperor a petition of his people; he says that Avienus was one of the two most influential civil officers in Rome in the 460s, together with Caecina Decius Basilius. However, Avienus distinguished himself from Basilius, as he used his influence to promote the career of his own associates, having no time to care for those who came outside of his circle. Even if he was more welcoming than Basilius, Avienus was less trustworthy.

== Bibliography ==
- Amory, Patrick, People and Identity in Ostrogothic Italy, 489-554, Cambridge University Press, 1997, ISBN 0-521-52635-3, p. 98.
- Gillett, Andrew, Envoys and Political Communication in the Late Antique West, 411-533, Cambridge University Press, 2003, ISBN 0-521-81349-2, pp. 114–115, 200.
- Martindale, John R., ed. (1980). The Prosopography of the Later Roman Empire: Volume II, AD 395–527. Cambridge: Cambridge University Press. pp. 193–194. ISBN 0-521-20159-4.

Preceded by Astyrius; Florentius Romanus Protogenes	Roman consul 450 with Valentinian Augustus VII	Succeeded by Marcian Augustus II; Valerius Faltonius Adelfius
