= Thalassius and Limneus =

Saints Thalassius and Limneus
- Born: Syria, Byzantine Empire
- Died: 5th century
- Feast: 22 February

Saints Thalassius and Limneus (5th century) were Syrian hermits. Their feast day is 22 February.

== Attestations ==
=== Monks of Ramsgate account ===
The monks of St Augustine's Abbey, Ramsgate wrote in their Book of Saints (1921):

Thalassius (St.), Hermit, (22 February)
(5th century) A Solitary in Syria, where, with his disciple Saint Limnæus, he inhabited a cave. He was famous among the Greeks for his sanctity of life; and one of the churches of Constantinople was dedicated to him.

=== Butler's account ===
The hagiographer Alban Butler (1710–1773) wrote in his Lives of the Fathers, Martyrs, and Other Principal Saints under 22 February:

SS. Thalassius and Limneus, CC

They were cotemporaries with the great Theodoret, bishop of Cyr, and lived in his diocese. The former dwelt in a cavern, in a neighbouring mountain, and was endowed with extraordinary gifts of the Holy Ghost, but was a treasure unknown to the world. His disciple, St. Limneus, was famous for miraculous cures of the sick, while he himself bore patiently the sharpest cholics and other distempers, without any human succour. He opened his enclosure only to Theodoret, his bishop, but spoke to others through a window. See Theodoret, Phil. c. 22.

=== Baring-Gould's account ===
Sabine Baring-Gould (1834–1924) in his Lives Of The Saints wrote under 22 February:

SS. THALASSIUS AND LIMNÆUS, HH.
(5TH CENTURY)
[Commemorated by the Greeks. Authority:—The Philotheus of Theodoret, c. 12. Theodoret knew these hermits, and visited them. He wrote whilst the latter was still alive.]

THALASSIUS was a hermit, living on the side of a hill near the village of Pillima, in the diocese of Cyrus, in Syria, then governed by the famous Theodoret, the ecclesiastical historian. Under his direction was disciplined Limnæus, who, as a boy, having a too glib tongue, learned to control it by imposing on himself, for many years, complete silence. Limnæus afterwards became the pupil of the hermit Maro.

He lived in a sort of court, made of rough stone walls, open to the sky, with a little door and window. Through the latter, he spoke with the people who visited him, but he suffered none, save the bishop, to enter through the door. One day, as he went forth, he trod on a viper, which bit his heel. He put forth his right hand to withdraw the venomous beast when it turned and fixed its fangs in his hand, and when he endeavoured to grasp it by the left, it bit his left hand also. He was bitten in more than ten places before he could disengage the serpent, yet he would not allow the wounds to be dressed by a physician but signed them with the cross. He suffered great torture from the bites but recovered. He loved to assemble the blind around his cell and teach them to sing hymns to the glory of God. For their accommodation, he built two houses adjoining his cell, and he devoted himself especially to their spiritual direction. Theodoret wrote of him when he had spent thirty-eight years in this manner of life.

== Bibliography ==
- Baring-Gould, S. (1897), The Lives of The Saints: Volume 02, February, London: J. C. Nimmo
- Butler, Alban (1866), The Lives of the Primitive Fathers, Martyrs, and Other Principal Saints, vol. 2, Dublin: James Duffy
- St. Augustine's Abbey, Ramsgate (1921), The Book of saints: a dictionary of servants of God canonized by the Catholic Church, London: A & C Black
