= Ardabur (consul 447) =

Roman military person in the 5th century

- Ἀρδαβούρ
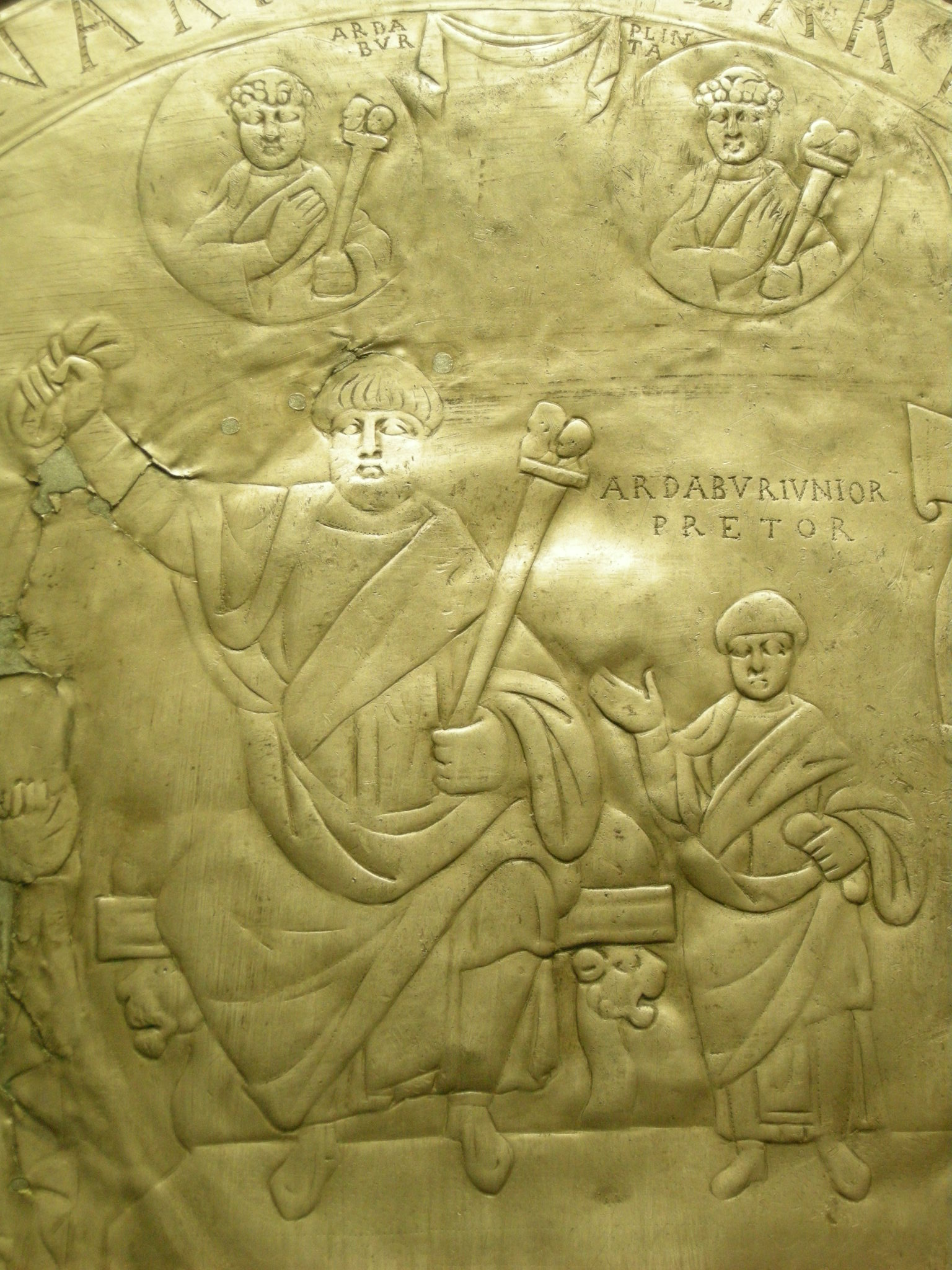
- A detail of the Missorium of Aspar, depicting Ardabur (right) and his father Aspar (c. 434)

Magister militum per Orientem
- In office 453 - 465/466

Consul of the Roman Empire
- In office 447

Personal details
- Died: 471
- Cause of death: Execution
- Parent: Aspar (father)

Ardabur (Ἀρδαβούρ, died 471) was an Eastern Roman magister militum of Alanic descent. He was the son of the influential general Aspar. He served as consul in 447 and as magister militum per Orientem from 453 until 465 or 466. Ardabur apparently often served under his father during his campaigns.

He was removed from this post in 466 after being accused of a treasonous plot involving the Sasanian Empire, probably by his father's political enemies. The accusation contributed to Aspar's fall from power. Both Ardabur and Aspar were killed in 471 as part of a conspiracy between the Isaurians and the emperor Leo I.

Political offices
Preceded by Flavius Aetius, Quintus Aurelius Symmachus	Consul of the Roman Empire; 447 with Calepius	Succeeded by Flavius Zeno, Flavius Rufius Praetextatus Postumianus
